= History of the Loiret =

Historical overview of the Loiret department in France from prehistory to the present

Coat of arms of Loiret, designed by Robert Louis around 1950 and officially adopted on October 10, 1964.

The history of the Loiret as an administrative entity began on December 22, 1789, with a decree from the Assemblée Constituante, effective on March 4, 1790. It was formed from parts of the former provinces of Orléanais and Berry.

Evidence of ancient settlement in the Loirétain territory dates to the Palaeolithic era. Romanization after the Gallic War was swift. Around 451, the Huns invaded the region but were repulsed at Orléans. The Franks later reached the Loire, and Clovis, a Christian convert, made Orléans the capital of a Frankish kingdom. Prosperity followed under Charlemagne. Orléans remained a capital until Louis VII.

The Hundred Years' War in the 14th and 15th centuries devastated the countryside, culminating in the siege of Orléans and the victory at Patay, led by Jeanne d'Arc. The 16th century saw an architectural and literary Renaissance but also religious strife, with Orléans as a Protestant stronghold, followed by the St. Bartholomew's Day massacre in 1572. The 17th century brought major infrastructure projects like the Briare and Orléans Canals and Loire levees, followed in the 18th century by the George-V bridge in Orléans. The territory was part of the généralité d’Orléans, established in 1558.

After late 18th-century food shortages, the French Revolution created the department. The 19th century saw political changes and, from the Second Empire, economic growth driven by agriculture—cereals in Beauce, vines in the Loire Valley—and transport developments like the Loire navy and railroads, alongside new industries. World War I and II heavily impacted the Loiret. Post-war reconstruction and the Trente Glorieuses brought growth. However, the early 21st century brought economic challenges.

== Prehistory ==
=== Paleolithic ===
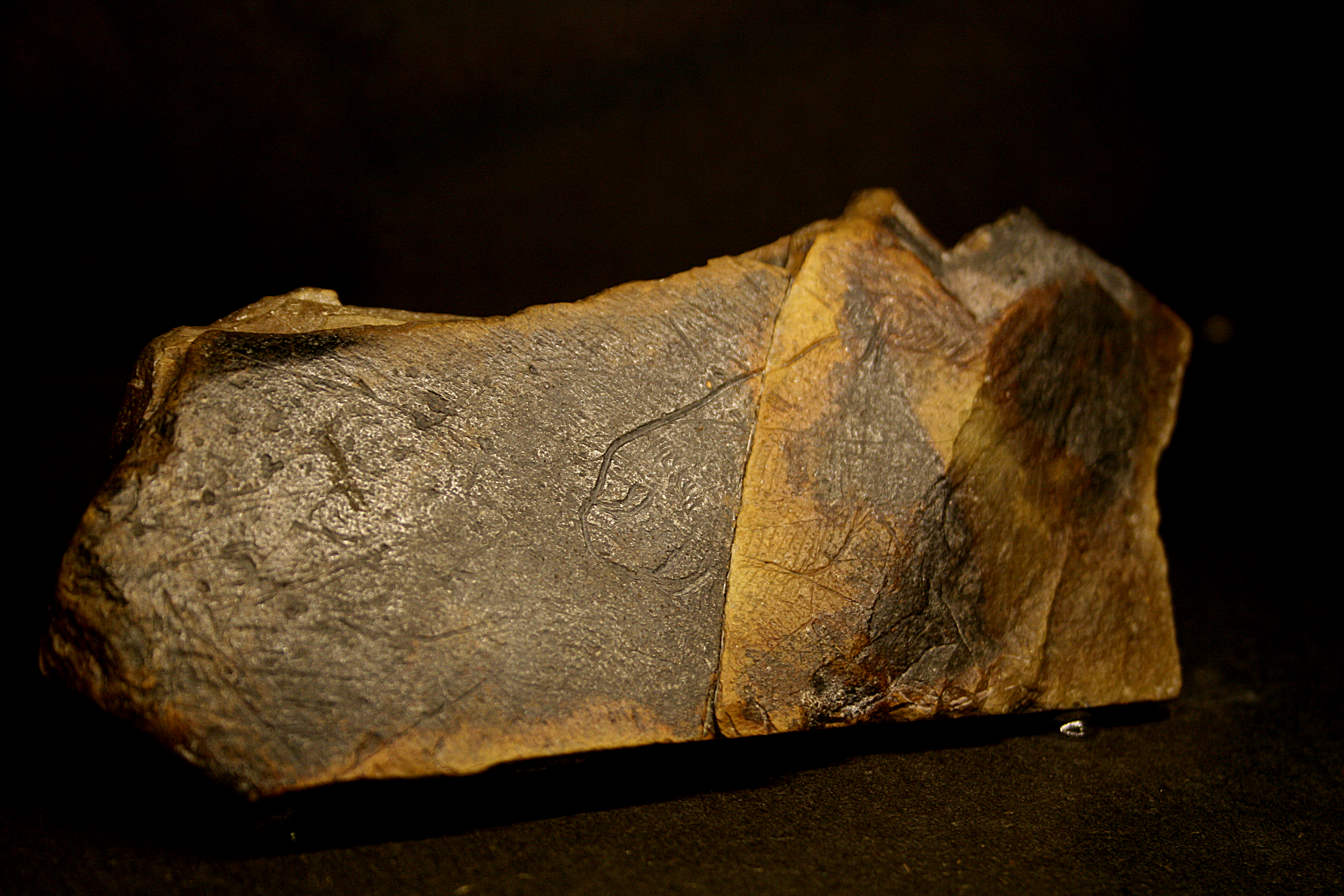
Engraved limestone plaque depicting a horse’s head, found at Cepoy (length: 14.5 cm), dated to around 13,000 years ago.

The earliest human presence in the Loiret dates to the Lower Paleolithic (c. 800,000 to 300,000 years ago), evidenced by Acheulean-style bifaces found in the Loire Valley, particularly on the plateaus of Briare and Gien, and in sand quarries at Châteauneuf-sur-Loire and Saint-Denis-de-l'Hôtel. Similar artifacts were discovered near the Loing River at Nargis and Dordives.

In the Upper Paleolithic, Magdalenian hunter-gatherers settled in the Loing Valley, with key sites at Pierre-aux-Fées and Pâtures Blanches in Cepoy, and Choiseau and Maison Blanche in Fontenay-sur-Loing. The Pierre-aux-Fées site, discovered in 1972 near Montargis, is a significant Magdalenian find for the southern Paris Basin. Notable artifacts include an engraved limestone plaque fragment depicting a horse’s head, indicating horse hunting and artistic skill, possibly linked to ritual practices, though this is unconfirmed.

=== Neolithic ===
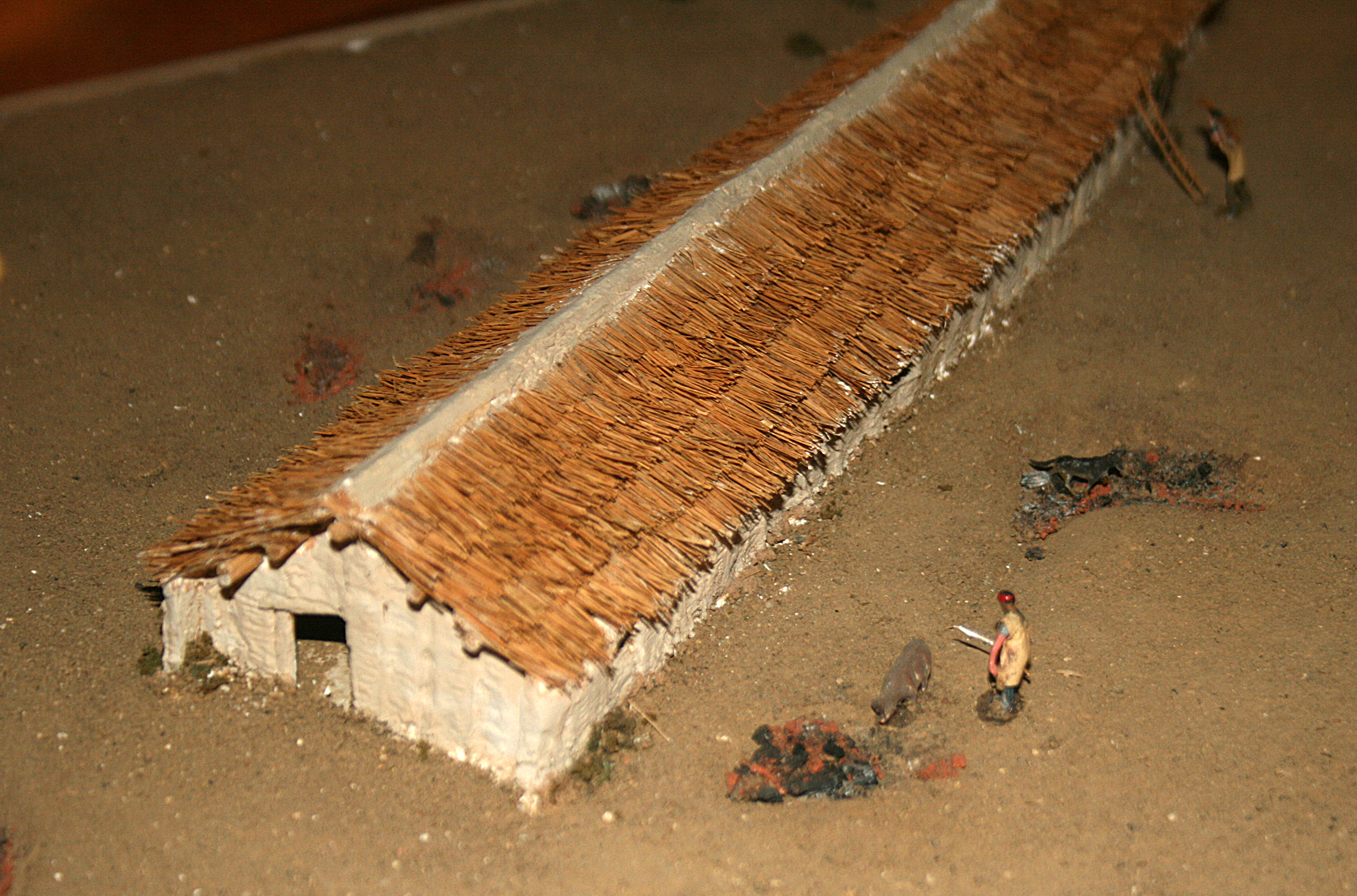
Reconstruction of a Neolithic farm. Six houses, approximately 35 meters long, were discovered at Échilleuses.

After the Mesolithic hunter-gatherers at Hauts-de-Lutz in Beaugency, permanent settlement began around 5500 BCE in the Neolithic. Early farmers settled along riverbanks and plateaus, such as at Échilleuses on the Beauce-Gâtinais border and the Vieux Chemin d’Étampes in Pithiviers, among the oldest Neolithic sites in Centre-Val de Loire. Tools and weapons were made from flint and bone, with axe workshops found at Corquilleroy and Fontenay-sur-Loing.

Neolithic burial practices evolved from individual graves, like one at La Chapelle-Saint-Mesmin, to slab-covered tombs at Malesherbes and Orville, cremation sites like the Canas necropolis in Varennes-Changy, and collective burials in dolmens. Numerous megaliths, especially menhirs in the northeast, likely had a cultic purpose, though their exact role is uncertain.

== Protohistory ==
=== Bronze Age ===
Around the mid-2nd millennium BC, Proto-Celts from Central Europe introduced bronze metallurgy to Gaul. Numerous tumuli attributed to this period appear in Beauce, along the borders of Loiret and Loir-et-Cher, and in the Mauves valleys near Baccon. These are followed around 1200 BCE by the Urnfield culture, known for practicing cremation as a funerary rite. Urns have been found at Tigy, Férolles, Olivet, Baule, and more recently at Courcelles during excavations tied to the A19 autoroute construction. Between Meung-sur-Loire and Saint-Ay, several notable deposits of Late Bronze Age weapons suggest rituals honoring wealthy deceased individuals.

=== Iron Age ===
Iron metallurgy emerged in the early 8th century BCE, enabling the forging of larger, sharper tools and weapons. For a time, bronze persisted for weapons and ornamental objects due to the challenges of working iron. While cremation continued, high-status individuals were often buried in tumuli. Several "princely" tumuli have been excavated in Loiret, with the most striking being the Butte des Élus tumulus in Mézières-lez-Cléry, measuring 70 meters in diameter and 12 meters high. Excavations in 1836 and 1857 uncovered folded iron swords, bronze armor fragments, bronze chains, gold jewelry, and a bronze vase. A stone anthropomorphic statue found on the slopes of the Lion-en-Sullias tumulus may represent an ancestor, possibly linked to a cult of the dead. Other notable tumuli include the Butte Moreau in Mardié and one in Sainte-Geneviève-des-Bois.

=== Rise of Gaulish civilization ===
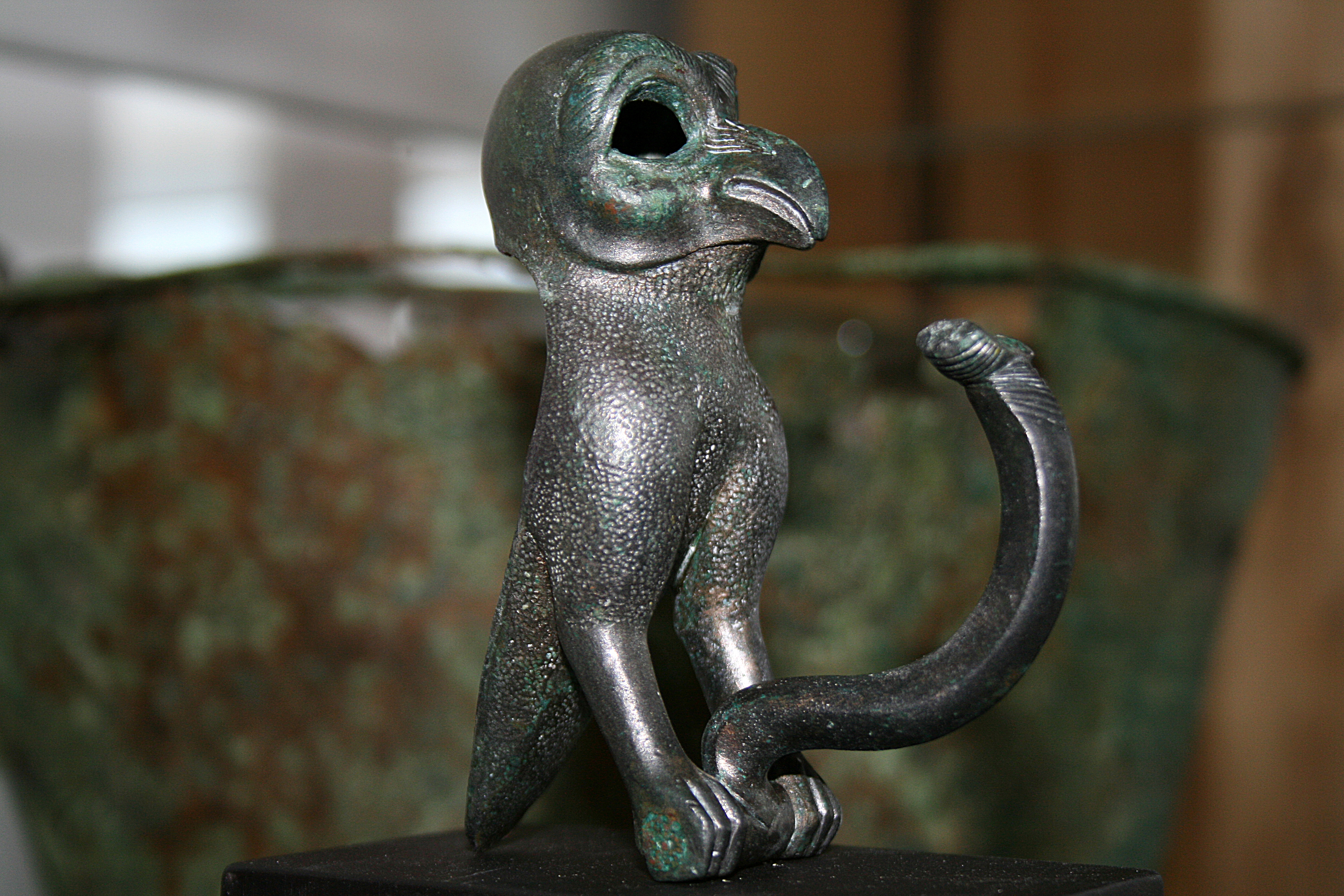
The “owl,” a bronze appliqué from Batilly-en-Gâtinais, likely an ornament for a wine vessel, discovered in 2006.

During the La Tène (c. 500 BCE), the Gaulish civilization thrived in the Orléanais region, primarily inhabited by the Carnutes, with the Senones in Gâtinais and the Aedui in Giennois. Settlement consisted of isolated farms and, by the early 2nd century BCE, unfortified towns with artisanal activity. Rural dwellings ranged from modest farms to lavish aristocratic residences, as seen at La Pièce de Chameul in Chevilly and Les Pierrières in Batilly-en-Gâtinais, excavated along the A19 autoroute.

Agriculture centered on cereal crops like barley and naked wheat, with emmer and einkorn declining. Millet waned by the end of La Tène, while rare plants like grass pea and woad indicate southern trade. Druids were central to Celtic society, and the Carnutes hosted an annual druidic gathering at a debated “sacred place,” possibly in Loiret near Neuvy-en-Sullias, Bonnée, and Bouzy-la-Forêt, where Gallo-Roman remains, including those at Fleury-sur-Loire (later the Abbey of Saint-Benoît-sur-Loire), were found.

The Carnutes were pivotal in the events leading to Rome’s annexation of Gaul. In 57/56 BC, Julius Caesar imposed Tasgetius, a high-born Carnute, as king, a move resented due to the Gauls’ aversion to kingship in cities. (Note: Jacques Debal points out in his book that the only concrete documents on Tasgetius, apart from the mention by Julius Cesar in the Bellum Gallicum, are coins minted with his name. The quotation from Bellum Gallicum is translated by J. Nivet, associate professor at Benjamin-Franklin High School, Orléans.) Tasgetius was assassinated in 54 BC, prompting Caesar to send Plancus’s legion to Cenabum (Orléans) to arrest the culprits. On February 13, 52 BC, the Carnutes massacred Roman traders in Cenabum, including Caius Fufius Cita, sparking a wider revolt led by Vercingetorix of the Arvernes, joined by tribes like the Senones and Bituriges. Caesar retaliated, sacking Cenabum, enslaving its inhabitants, and looting the town. After the Gallic defeat at Alesia in 52 BC, the Carnutes were subjugated, and Gaul entered nearly three centuries of Pax Romana.

== Antiquity ==
After Julius Caesar’s departure, Caius Trebonius and two Roman legions governed the devastated Cenabum. In 27 BCE, Augustus integrated the Carnutes’ territory into the province of Lyonnaise, spanning from the Seine to the Loire. Autricum (Chartres) became the political center, while Cenabum (Orléans) served as the economic hub, a key port and bridge at the Loire’s great bend.

Roman administration brought order and expanded communication networks, enhancing Cenabum’s prosperity. Ancient Celtic roads were densified, and in 1936, historian Jacques Soyer documented these in Les Voies antiques de l'Orléanais. Using archaeological finds, medieval records, and archives, he identified sixteen routes from Orléans, six confirmed as Roman-era, connecting to Sens (Agedincum), Pithiviers (Petuarii), Paris (Lutetia), Chartres (Autricum) (two routes), Châteaudun (Dunum), Le Mans (Vindinum) (two routes), Tours (Caesarodunum), Limoges (Augustoritum), Bourges (Avaricum), Sancerre (Gortona or Cortona) (two roads), Autun (Augustodunum) and Auxerre (Autessiodurum). Eleven transverse routes bypassing Cenabum were also noted.

Inland waterway transport on the Loire, managed by the nautae ligerici, was vital. Cenabum’s strategic location—equidistant from the Loire’s source and mouth, at its northernmost point near the Seine—made it a commercial hub even before Caesar’s arrival. Roman traders settled there, and Strabo described it as the Carnutes’ “market.” Cenabum facilitated east-west trade across Gaul, linking Marseille to Armorican ports. The Loire was a key route for merchants sourcing tin from Armorican sailors trading with Britain.

=== Urban development ===
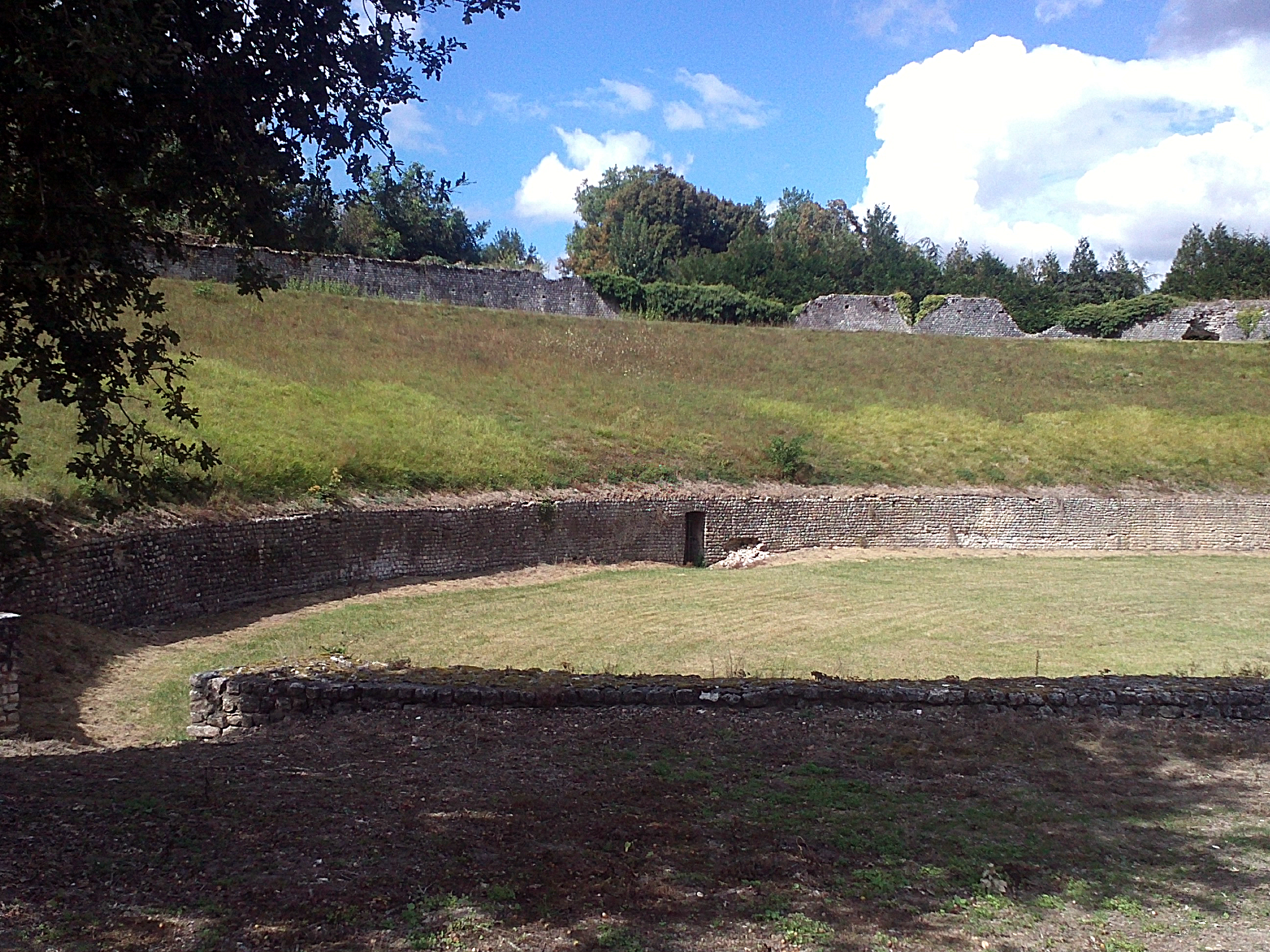
Ancient rural amphitheater of Chenevières, adjacent to the Craon thermal site in Montbouy

After its destruction, Cenabum was rebuilt in the early 1st century, expanding eastward and westward onto former rural land. Buildings adopted Roman-style construction with stone and mortar, featuring baths, hypocaust heating, painted plaster, and mosaic decorations. Cenabum’s monumental ensemble was modest compared to other cities, including a theater at the northern entrance, thermal baths fed by an aqueduct from the Etuvée fountain, a sanctuary for the water goddess Acionna, a forum, and a temple under the modern prefecture. Few remnants survive. The city’s road grid included the north-south cardo (now Rue de la Poterne and Rue Parisie), the east-west decumanus (Rue de Bourgogne), and the road to Bourges (Rue Saint-Marceau).

More significant monumental complexes existed in Gâtinais, Beauce, Loire Valley, and Puisaye. At Triguères, on a former Gallic oppidum, a temple, two spa buildings, and a large amphitheater were built near a venerated menhir. Secondary settlements like Sceaux-du-Gâtinais, listed in the 4th-century Tabula Peutingeriana as Aquae Segeste, thrived in the 1st and 2nd centuries with a temple to the fertility goddess Segeta. Excavations at Le Préau uncovered a marble disc inscribed “AUG-DEA-SEGETAE". At Montbouy, sacred springs supported wells, baths, and a theater-amphitheater at Château de Chenevières, with tiers for up to 6,000 spectators.

Other urban complexes, revealed by aerial surveys and preventive archaeology, include Briare (Brivodurum), Pithiviers-le-Vieil on a major Beauce road, and Beaune-la-Rolande, founded c. AD 50–70 along the Orléans-Sens road.

In rural areas, a dense network of farms and villae covered eastern Beauce and western Gâtinais. These combined agricultural (pars rustica) and residential (pars urbana) functions, with some villae, like the Gallo-Roman villa at Attray (Cul d’Anon site), being notably luxurious.

=== Gallo-Roman religion ===
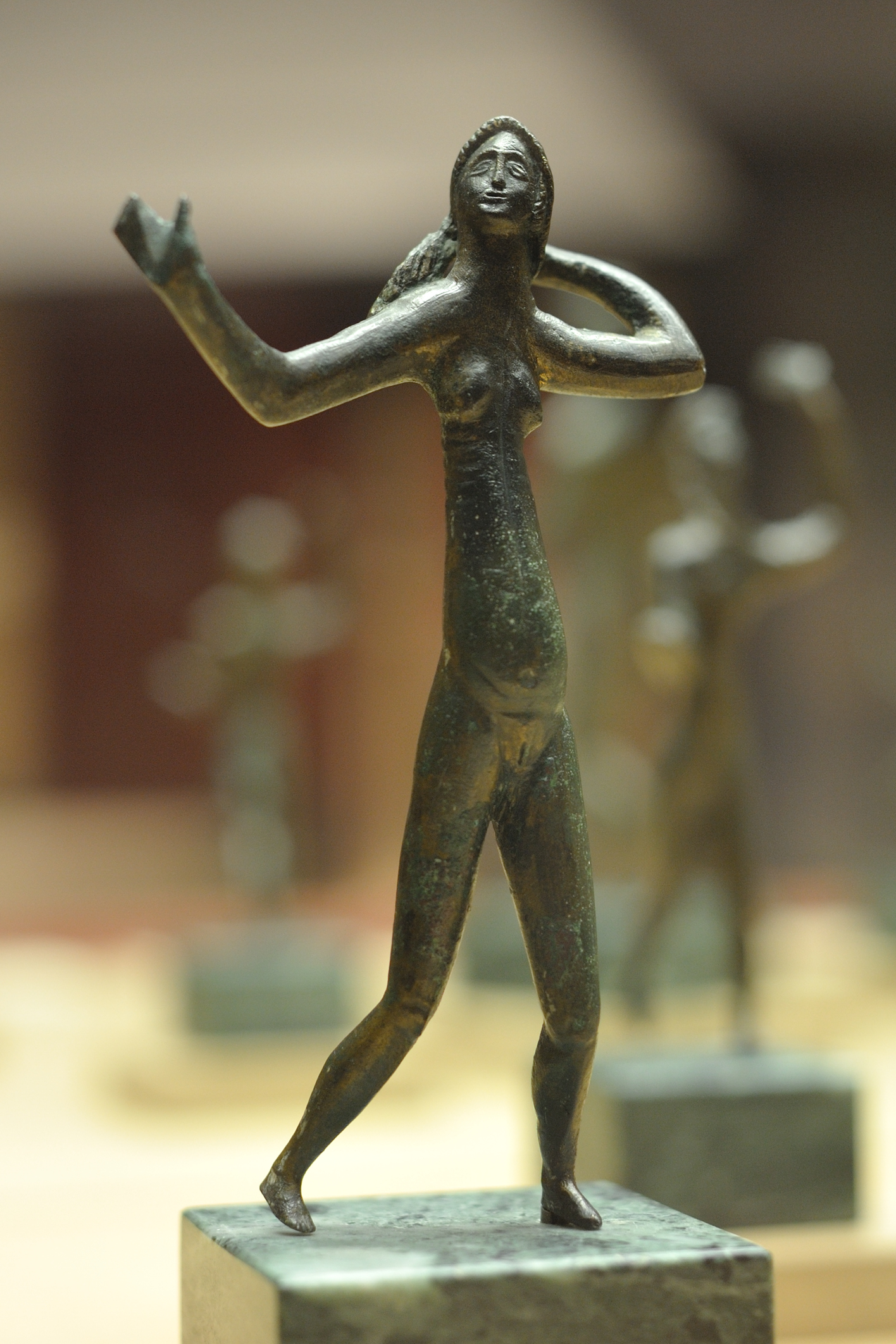
The "Great Dancer" from the Neuvy-en-Sullias Treasure, one of a series of Gaulish statuettes.

The study of religious practices during the Roman occupation, particularly through treasures found at Neuvy-en-Sullias and Vienne-en-Val, highlights a deep fusion of Gaulish and Roman traditions. On May 27, 1861, a sand quarry in Neuvy-en-Sullias revealed a hoard of about thirty bronze artifacts buried in a 1.40-square-meter pit of bricks, stones, and tiles. Known as the Neuvy-en-Sullias Treasure, it includes animal sculptures, stylized figurines, and statuettes of Roman deities like Bacchus, Mars, and Aesculapius, modeled on Latin prototypes. A prominent horse statue, dated to the early 2nd century BCE, is the centerpiece. Most artifacts date from the 1st century BCE to 1st century CE, though boar figures predate Roman arrival, with the hoard’s burial likely in the 2nd or 3rd century CE.

While the Roman pantheon dominated, indigenous deities were widely worshipped through assimilation with Roman gods, such as Mars-Rudiobus (Neuvy-en-Sullias) and Mars-Mocetius (Orléans). Local tutelary goddesses like Segeta (Sceaux-du-Gâtinais) and Adonna (Orléans) were also revered, often under the patronage of Roman deities, reflecting the elevation of Gaulish goddesses to public city deities.

=== Barbarian invasions ===
In the 3rd century CE, weakened Roman frontier defenses allowed Alemanni and Franks to plunder Gaul, targeting farms, sanctuaries, villages, and towns in the Loiret region. The sanctuary at Vienne-en-Val was sacked, though the Neuvy-en-Sullias Treasure, hidden carefully, escaped looting. Emperor Probus repelled invasions in 276 and 282 CE, and emperors Diocletian (r. 284–305) and Constantine I (r. 306–337) restored order. To improve governance, the Carnutes’ territory was divided into two districts: the civitas Carnutum (Chartres) and the civitas Aurelianorum (Cenabum, later Aurelianis, then Orléans).

As barbarian incursions persisted, cities fortified themselves. Aurelianis built a defensive wall between 364 and 383 CE under Valentinian I or his sons, used until the 15th century. In 407 CE, Vandals devastated the castrum at Meung-sur-Loire, as noted in Saint Liphard’s life.

The Hun invasion of 451 CE elevated Bishop Aignan, who organized Orléans’ defense against Attila’s 50,000-strong army. After capturing Metz and advancing toward Orléans, Attila encamped east of the city in May 451. Aignan, aged 92, sought aid from Roman general Aetius in Arles, who promised relief by June. Aignan rallied resistance, but the city surrendered. As the Huns began chaining inhabitants, Aignan spotted Aetius’ approaching legions. Attila fled and was defeated at the Catalaunian Plains on June 20, 451. Catalaunian Plains on June 20, 451. This event inspired a legend, reflected in the fairy tale Bluebeard, where Aignan’s watch for rescue became “Agne, my brother Agne, do you see nothing coming?"

== Early Middle Ages ==
The Division of Gaul in 511. The kingdom of Clodomir, encompassing the Loiret, is shown in red.

=== Unification and Merovingian Conflicts ===
In 463, Roman general Aegidius, with Salian Frank king Childeric I, defeated the Visigoths at the Battle of Orléans, likely near Saint-Hilaire-Saint-Mesmin, Olivet, and Orléans. The region between the Seine and Loire remained under Roman control under Syagrius, Aegidius’s son, until Clovis I defeated him at the Battle of Soissons in 486.

The reign of Clovis I saw the pivotal Council of Orléans in July 511, aligning Frankish royalty with the Gallic Church to unify diverse populations through Catholicism. This council, attended by 32 bishops from seven provinces, issued 31 canons on July 10, 511, with Clovis’s approval, blending Germanic and Gallo-Roman traditions.

After Clovis’s death in 511, the Frankish Kingdom (Regnum Francorum) was divided among his sons: Clodomir received Orléanais, Theuderic I Metz, Childebert I Paris, and Clothar I Soissons. Clodomir’s kingdom, centered on the Loire, was organized into duchies, counties, and districts, with an itinerant government.

Council of Orléans (511) - Represented dioceses.

In 524, Clodomir ordered the assassination of Sigismund, the King of the Burgundians, and his family near Saint-Péravy-la-Colombe, a village 20 kilometers northwest of Orléans. Their bodies were cast into a well, a site later named Saint-Sigismond, which became a pilgrimage center honoring the martyred Burgundian king. Clodomir’s campaign against the Burgundians ended with his death at the Battle of Vézeronce on June 21, 524.

The Church’s influence grew as royal power weakened, evidenced by councils in Orléans (511, 533, 538, 541, 549), which strengthened monarchy-Church ties. Following Theuderic I's death, Childebert I and Clothar I seized Clodomir’s realm, which Clothar unified in 558. Upon Clothar’s death in 561, the kingdom split again among his sons: Guntram, ruling Burgundy and part of Orléanais from Orléans, engaged with diverse subjects, including Eastern merchants, as noted by Gregory of Tours in 585. Orléans remained a key trade hub despite Germanic migrations and Frankish settlement.

=== Age of Abbeys ===
Amid Merovingian conflicts and territorial divisions, several notable monasteries were established in the Loiret region: Saint-Aignan of Orléans, Saint-Benoît-sur-Loire, and Ferrières. The Basilica of Saint-Aignan is first mentioned in the late 6th century by Gregory of Tours.

In the 7th century, Jean, a wealthy Eastern merchant, founded a convent dedicated to Saint Mary at Fleury (now Saint-Benoît-sur-Loire) to counter paganism. Leodebod, a Frankish merchant and abbot of Saint-Aignan in Orléans, established a second convent there dedicated to Saint Peter. Between 648 and 651, Leodebod traded his Attigny estate with King Clovis II for Fleury and merged the two convents into a single Benedictine monastery, endowing it generously. Around 670–672, the abbey acquired Saint Benedict’s relics, becoming Saint-Benoît-sur-Loire, a pilgrimage center with royal support.

Ferrières Abbey founded in 636 by Walbert, Count of Hainaut, at Ferrières-en-Gâtinais during the reigns of Dagobert I and Clovis II, gained prominence under the Carolingians.

Abbeys Founded in the 7th Century
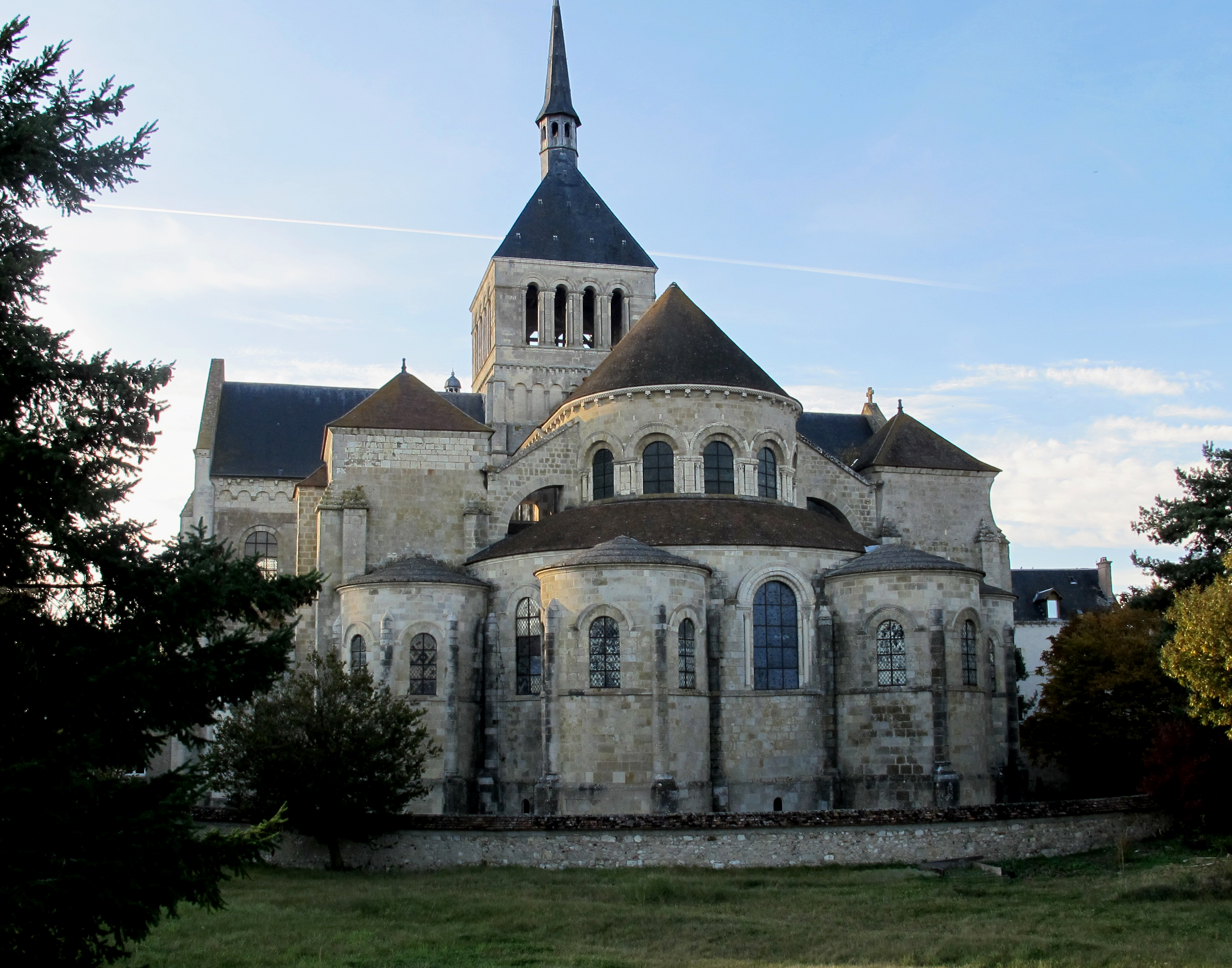
Saint-Aignan of Orléans.

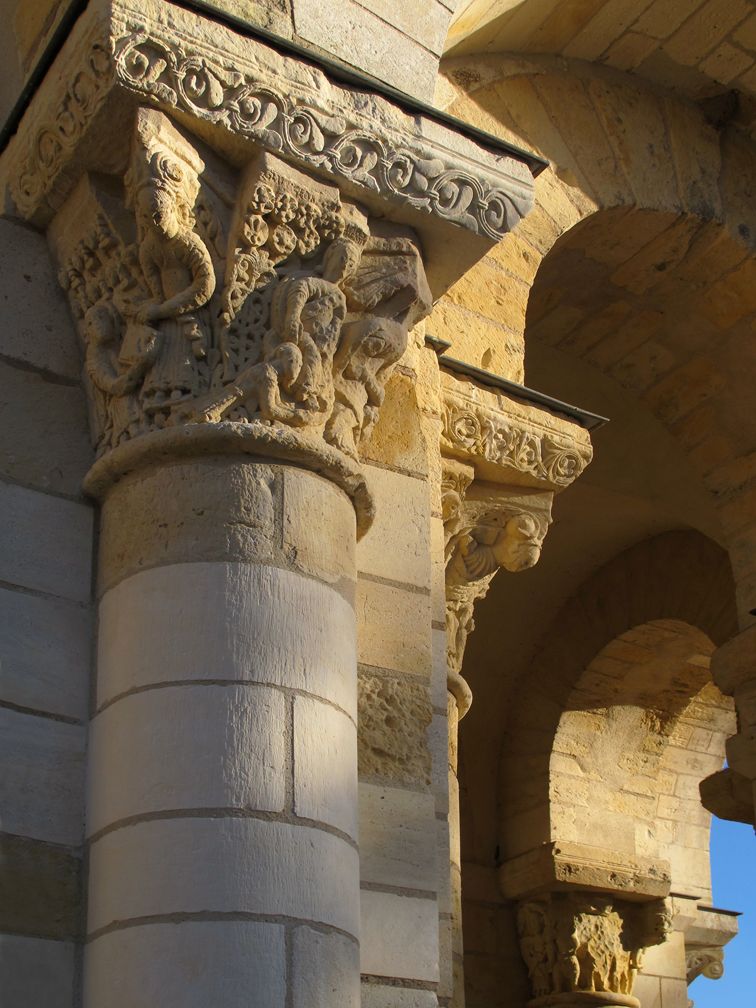
Saint-Benoît, one of the porch-tower capitals dedicated to the Apocalypse.

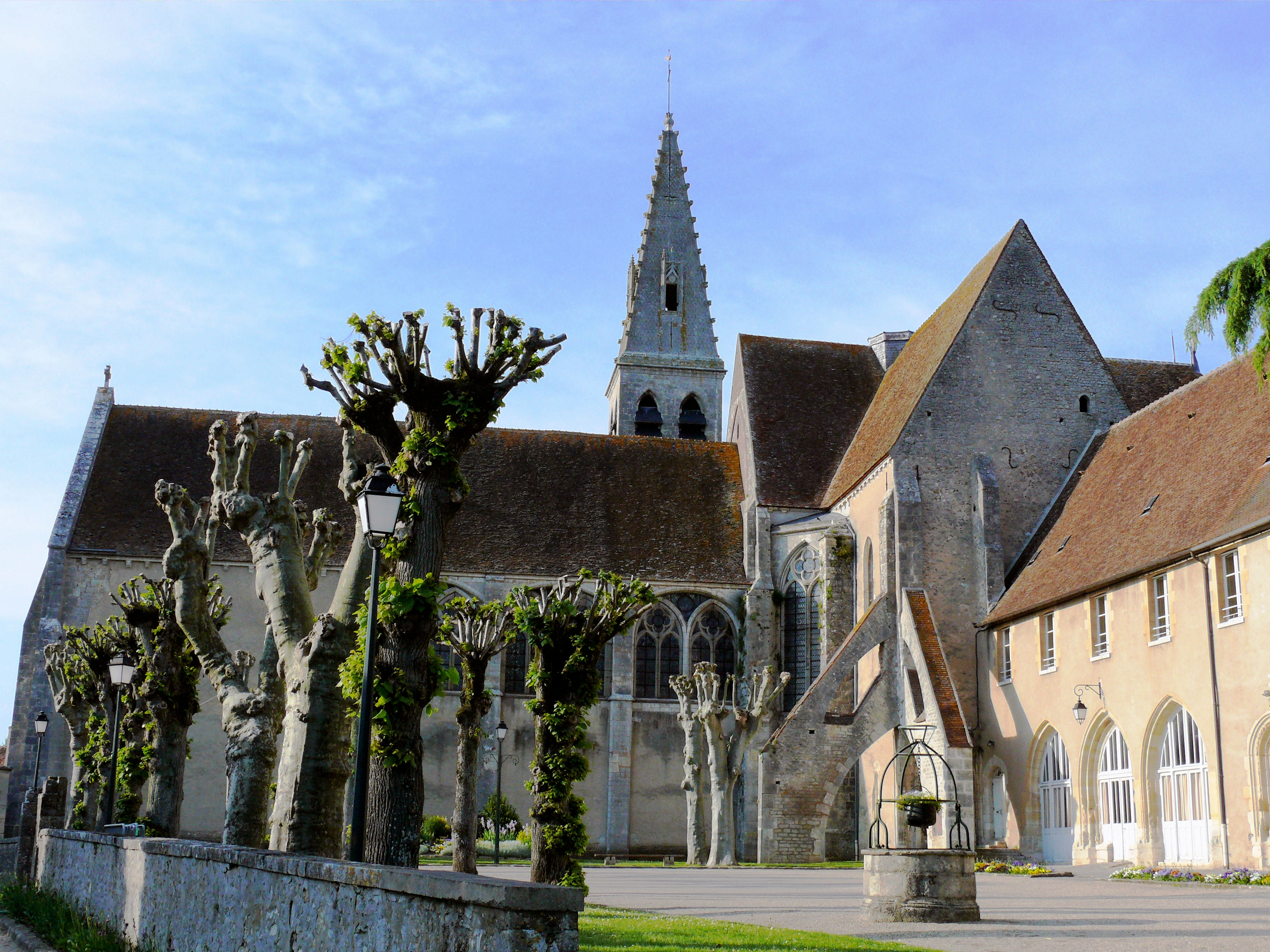
Ferrières Abbey, general view.

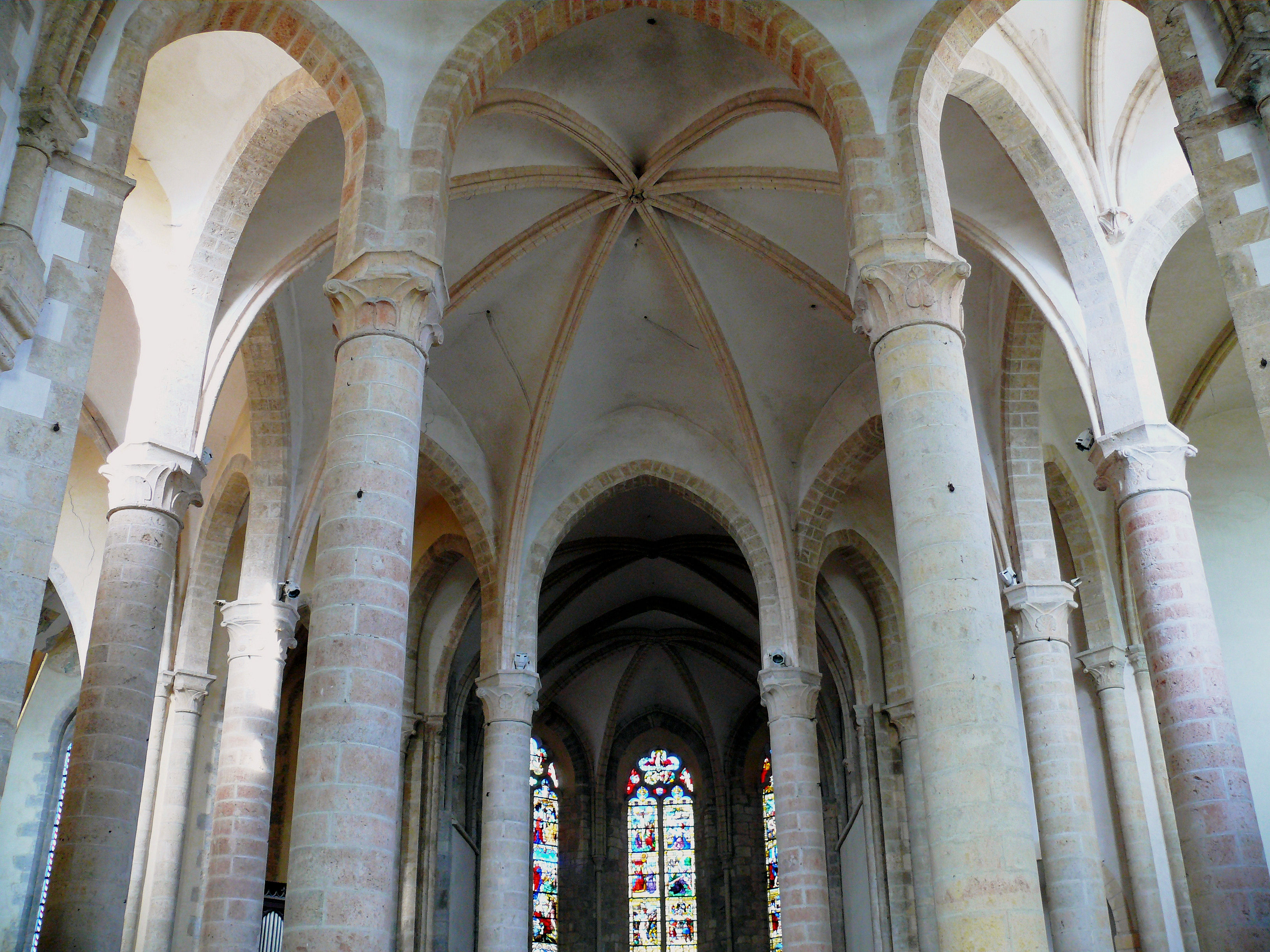
Ferrières Abbey, transept crossing and choir.

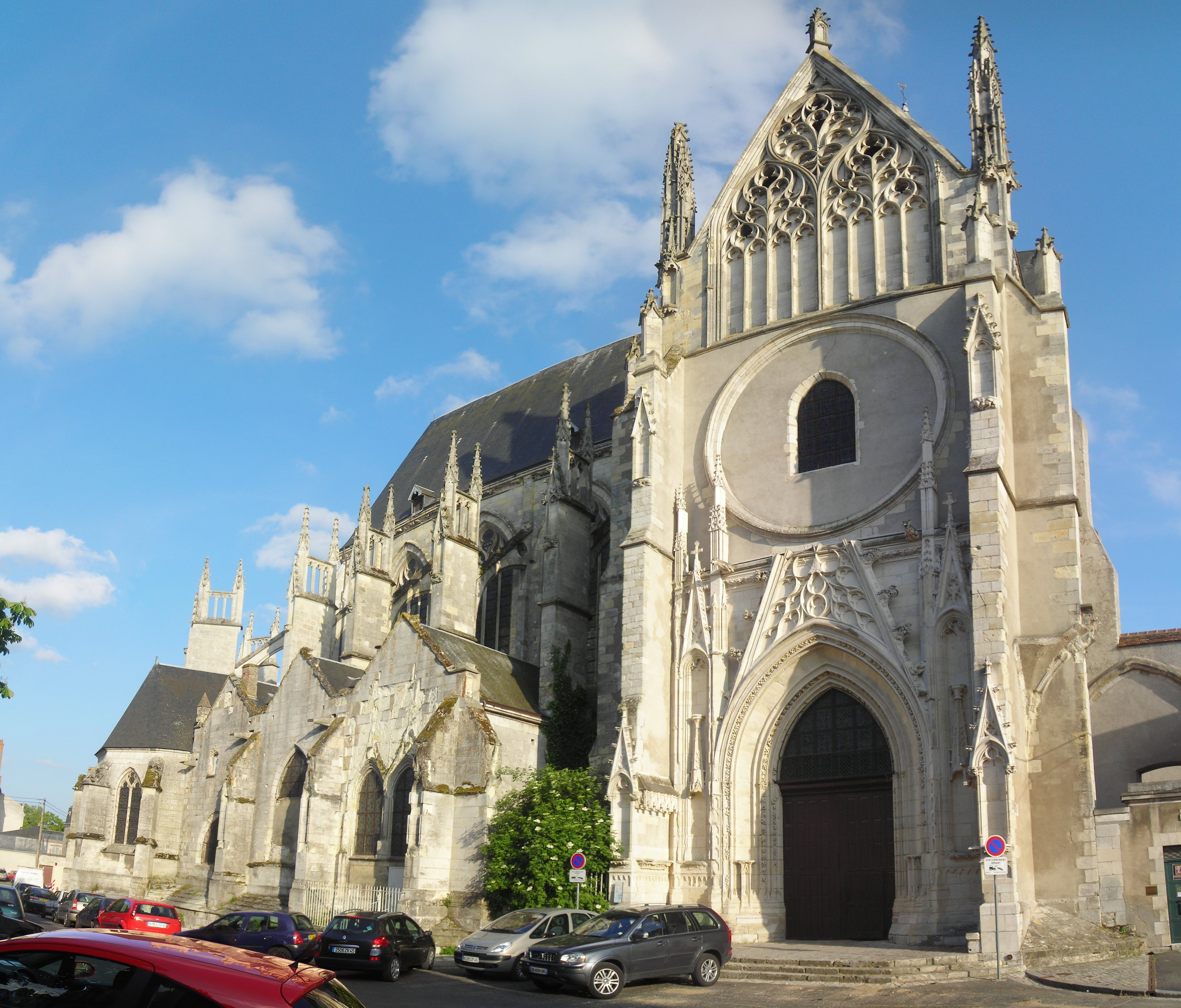
Church of Saint-Aignan, Orléans.

=== Carolingian Renaissance ===
In 771, Charlemagne, son of Pepin the Short, unified the Frankish kingdom. He visited Orléans once, on June 5, 800, en route to his coronation as emperor in Rome on December 25, 800.

Under Charlemagne, the Loiret region saw a cultural revival, led by advisors Alcuin and Theodulf, encompassing literature, scripture, education, liturgy, theology, and arts. Alcuin, an Anglo-Saxon deacon, served as abbot of Ferrières and Saint-Martin de Tours, while Theodulf, a bishop, held abbacies at Saint-Aignan of Orléans, Saint-Liphard de Meung-sur-Loire, Saint-Mesmin de Micy, and Saint-Benoît-sur-Loire. Monasteries maintained scriptoria for copying manuscripts, and Theodulf established rural elementary schools and advanced learning in abbeys. A poet, Theodulf wrote Carmina, inspired by Virgil and Ovid, and excelled as a liturgist, exegete, and theologian. Between 806 and 811, he commissioned the Carolingian Oratory of Germigny-des-Prés, designed by Armenian architect Odo of Metz, featuring France’s only Byzantine mosaic of two angels flanking the Ark of the Covenant, inspired by the mosaics of San Vitale, Ravenna.

Ferrières Abbey peaked in the 9th century under Loup de Ferrières, abbot from 840. With a rich library and active scriptorium, previously led by Alcuin, Sigulf, and Saint Aldric, it exchanged manuscripts with monasteries in England and Italy. Loup’s 134 letters document its scholarly vibrancy. The Carolingian Loiret reflects a blend of Celtic, Greek, Roman, Germanic, and Christian cultures that shaped Europe.

=== Viking incursions and the end of the Carolingians ===
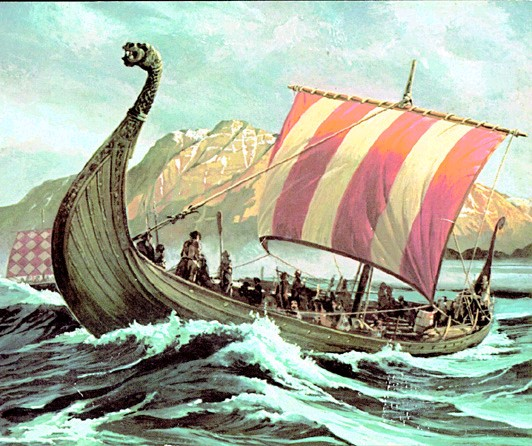
The first Viking ships appeared on the Atlantic coast in 843 and ascended the Middle Loire.

After Louis the Pious's death, Charlemagne’s empire fragmented as his heirs fought, culminating in the Treaty of Verdun in 843, signed near Orléans, which split the empire into three. That year, Viking langskips—shallow-draft vessels carrying 50 men—sailed up the Middle Loire, looting towns, abbeys, and countryside. The Vikings used Loire estuary bases for raids, taking gold, silver, and slaves back to their homeland. In 854, Bishops Agius of Orléans and Burchardus of Chartres repelled a Norman raid on Orléans, driving the Danes to the lower Loire. In 868, Bishop Menou of Dol fled to Orléans with Saint Samson’s relics, leaving some at Saint-Symphorien church (renamed Saint-Samson) before returning to Brittany.

Charles II entrusted Orléans’ military command to his cousin Hugh, who, after Charles’s death, reconciled Louis III and Carloman II. They defeated the Danes on the Vienne in 879. Hugh protected the relics of Saint Benedict and Saint Martin in Saint-Aignan church. After Hugh’s death in 886, the county passed to Odo, son of Robert the Strong, who defended Paris against the Normans in 885–886 and was elected king of the Franks in 888, ruling until a 898 compromise with Charles the Simple. Hugh Capet, Odo’s great-nephew, became king in 987.

Four coronations took place in the Loiret, three in Orléans: Charles II on June 6, 848, at Sainte-Croix Cathedral, anointed by Archbishop Hincmar of Reims; Louis III and Carloman in 879 at Ferrières-en-Gâtinais; Robert the Pious in 987 in Orléans; and Louis VI the Fat in 1108 in Orléans.

== Late Middle Ages ==
=== Capetians and the consolidation of the state (11th–13th centuries) ===
According to the monk chronicler Rodulfus Glaber, Orléans was "the primary residence of the kings of France, owing to its beauty, its large population, and the fertility of its soil." At the ascension of Hugh Capet, the royal domain was fragmented and limited. The County of Orléans encompassed the castellanies of Beaugency, Boiscommun, Châteauneuf-sur-Loire, Châteaurenard, Lorris, Neuville-aux-Bois, Orléans, Vitry-aux-Loges, Janville, and Yèvre-le-Châtel. Surrounded by powerful fiefs, the Orléanais was bordered by the County of Blois and County of Chartres (controlling Beaugency) to the west, the Viscountcy of Bourges to the south, and the County of Sancerre, lordships of Gien and Courtenay, and County of Gâtinais to the southeast and east. The Capetians prioritized consolidating authority within Orléanais, facing resistance from feudal lords wary of the dynasty’s unifying ambitions.

In 1022, a group of about a dozen heretics, including learned canons from Orléans Cathedral, some linked to Constance of Arles, was exposed. Their doctrine, difficult to connect definitively toearlier Manichaean or Cathar heresies, rejected the concept of grace and sacraments, emphasizing an inward spiritual quest and rigorous asceticism. This challenged episcopal authority, criticized for secular issues like simony, amid growing support for Church reform. However, their radical theological innovations threatened the social structure of medieval Christendom. Secular and ecclesiastical authorities responded with a high-profile trial and severe punishment to condemn the deviations of these Orléanais intellectuals.

The convicted were burned at the stake, marking the first recorded such execution in medieval Christendom. The Orléans case is notable for the severity of the punishment and the intellectual caliber of the accused, standing out as a unique episode in the 11th-century “springtime of heresies".

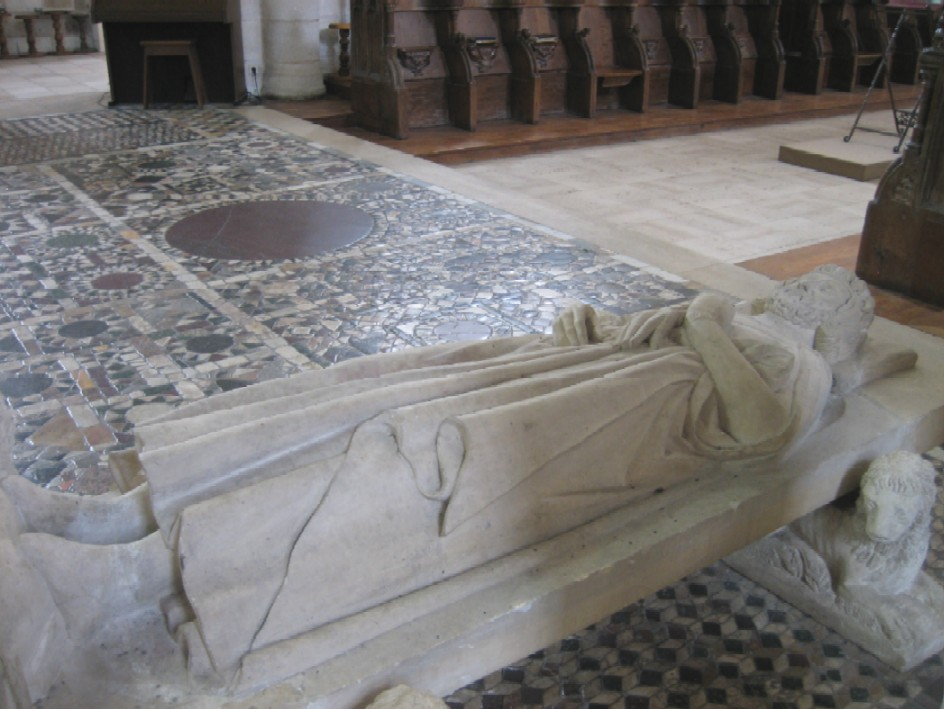
Effigy of Philip I of France in the Abbey of Saint-Benoît-sur-Loire.

In 1068, Fulk IV of Anjou, with King Philip I’s support, ousted his Geoffrey III, ceding the County of Gâtinais to the crown. This strengthened Philip I’s holdings, linking Sens and Melun to Étampes and Orléans, and laid the foundation for centralized authority. Philip I died in 1108 and was buried at Saint-Benoît-sur-Loire, where his 13th-century effigy remains. His son, Louis VI "the Fat" (r. 1108–1137), crowned at Orléans’ Sainte-Croix Cathedral, continued residing in Orléanais despite its encirclement by Blois-Champagne lands. He fortified fortresses at Yèvre-le-Châtel, Boesse, and Chambon in Vrigny, expanding the royal domain.

Louis VII (r. 1137–1180) bolstered Capetian holdings by marrying Eleanor of Aquitaine in 1137, annexing her Duchy of Aquitaine. However, the royal domain remained modest compared to vassals like the Plantagenets. In 1152, Eleanor obtained an annulment at Beaugency and married Henry Plantagenet, sparking a centuries-long Franco-English conflict. Louis VII stripped Henry of his French fiefs, escalating tensions. That year, Bishop Manassès de Garlande officiated Louis VII’s marriage to Constance of Castile in Orléans.

As royal authority grew, Paris became the political center, reducing Orléanais’ exposure to feudal strife. Saint Louis (r. 1226–1270) and Philip the Fair (r. 1285–1314) annexed lands like Beaugency (1291) or created apanages, such as Gien (1293) for Louis of Évreux. Overcoming feudal resistance to centralized monarchy was challenging in this turbulent era.

Economic and social progress flourished. Vineyards thrived in the Loire Valley, and Orléans, hosting four royally privileged fairs, dominated commerce. In 1057, Henry I of France decreed open gates during grape harvests and banned wine levies, boosting trade. The feudal system weakened, with Louis VI granting the 1119 Lorris charter, freeing inhabitants to cultivate lands and offering liberty to serfs after a year and a day. Louis VI (1155) and Philip Augustus (1187) reaffirmed this, extending it to 83 towns, including Yèvre-le-Châtel, Puiseaux, and Ferrières-en-Gâtinais, stimulating commerce. In 1170, Peter I of Courtenay sold a charter to Montargis to fund his crusade.

In 1178, two charters abolished duties on Orléans’ merchants’ goods, enhancing trade. Guilds, like the “Community of Merchants Frequenting the Loire River and Its Tributaries,” formalized statutes, relying on royal support to reduce boatmen’s taxes. Louis VII (1137) protected Orléans’ burghers from provost abuses, and Philip Augustus involved bourgeois in setting the taille tax. By the 13th century, municipal life emerged, with townsfolk electing procurators, securing urban freedoms despite Philip the Fair's restrictions, eroding feudal lords’ authority.

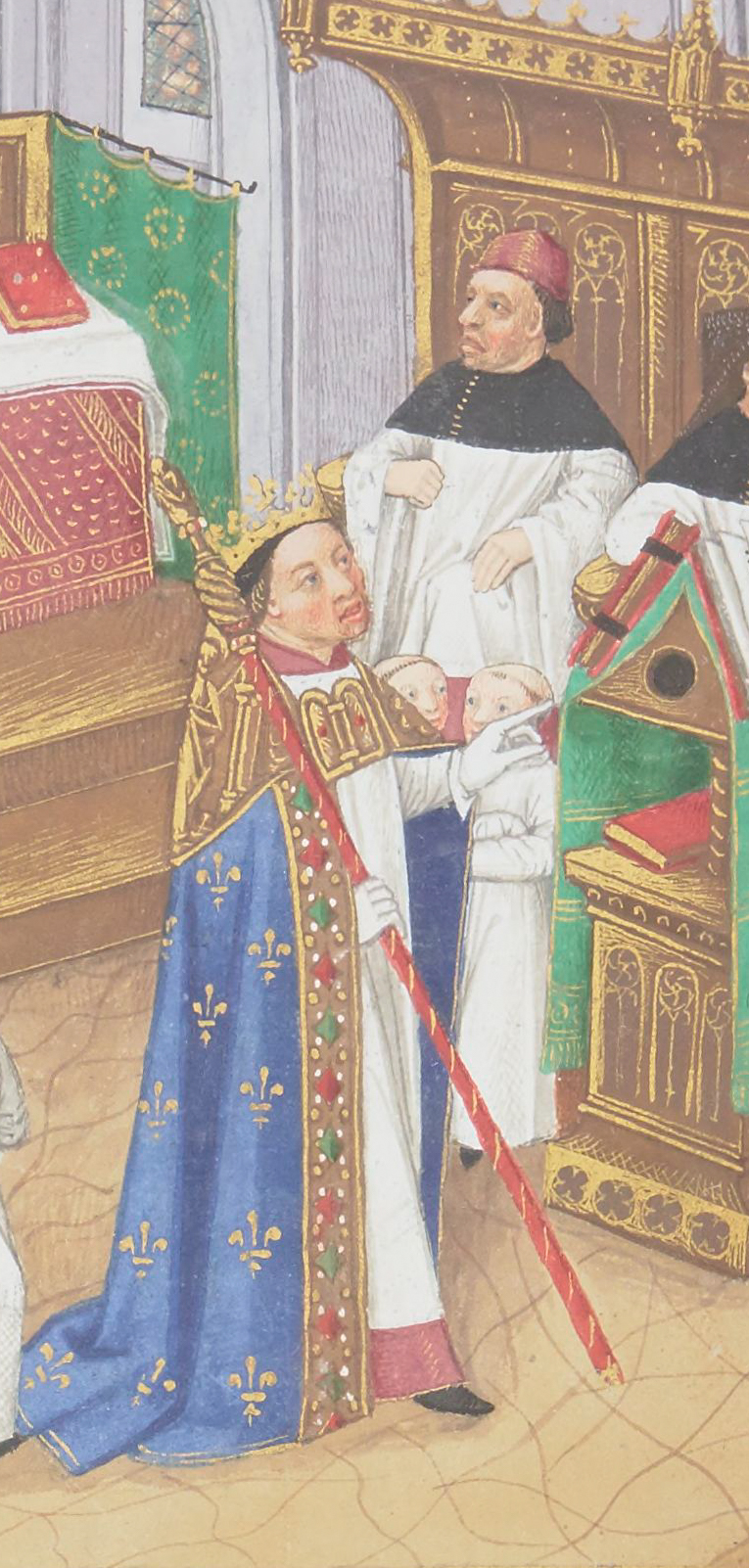
Robert the Pious at a service in Orléans Cathedral. Robinet Testard, Grandes Chroniques de France, c. 1471, Paris, Bibliothèque nationale de France, Fr.2609, f.14v.

With the rise of the Capetians, the Church strengthened its influence. Bishop Arnoul of Orléans, a supporter of Hugh Capet, convinced Hugh’s son, Robert the Pious, to rebuild religious sites devastated by Norman raids and the 989 fire. Construction of Orléans’ third cathedral began in the 10th century, continued under Bishop Arnould II in the early 11th century, and was completed by the early 12th century. Housing a True Cross relic from Charlemagne, it was noted in the 1137 Pilgrim's Guide as one of France’s largest cathedrals. Its rapid construction caused structural issues, and by 1278, Bishop Robert de Courtenay chose to build a new Gothic cathedral. Bishop Gille Pasté laid its cornerstone in 1287, featuring a Gothic choir with flying buttresses, dedicated in 1329, with apsidal and lateral chapels added in the 13th and 14th centuries.

A monastic reform movement revitalized the Benedictine Rule post-millennium. Gauzlin of Fleury, abbot of Saint-Benoît-sur-Loire (1004–1031) and half-brother of Robert the Pious, rebuilt the abbey with a porch tower symbolizing Heavenly Jerusalem, adorned with Apocalypse-inspired capitals, and enriched it with Italian manuscripts, mosaics, and artworks. With Capetian support, notably from Philip I, Abbot Guillaume (1070–1080) rebuilt the Notre-Dame abbey church, completing the choir in 1108, with the nave joined to Gauzlin’s tower in the early 12th century.

Ferrières-en-Gâtinais abbey, restored from ruin, gained an octagonal rotunda in the 13th century. New foundations included Notre-Dame Abbey in Beaugency (12th century, Augustinian Canons), and Cistercian abbeys La Cour-Dieu and Fontainejean (early 12th century). Mendicant orders arrived later: Dominicans in Orléans (1219) and Montargis (1217), and Franciscans in Orléans (1241).

The school at Saint-Benoît-sur-Loire became France’s leading monastic study center, training skilled miniaturists under Raoul Tortaire in the 12th century. Orléans’ schools, around Saint-Aignan, Saint-Pierre-le-Puellier, and Sainte-Croix Cathedral, attracted figures like Maurice de Sully in the 11th century. By the 12th century, Orléans excelled in rhetoric, canon law, and Roman law, becoming the French capital of Roman law after Pope Gregory IX authorized its teaching in 1235, banned in Paris since 1219. Legal scholars, including Yves Hélory (Saint Yves), Clement V, and John XXII, studied there. Clement V's 1306 papal bull recognized Orléans’ university, though local residents, wary of student unrest, protested. In 1312, Philip the Fair limited academic privileges, prompting a 1316 student exodus to Nevers. By 1320, Philip V restored the university’s privileges.

=== Hundred Years' War (1337–1453) ===
1429 Territories controlled by Henry V of England. Territories controlled by the Duke of Burgundy. Territories controlled by Dauphin Charles. Major battles English raid of 1415. Route of Joan of Arc to Reims in 1429.

In 1328, the Salic law led French nobles to crown Philip of Valois as Philip VI, bypassing Edward III of England, a direct heir through his mother. On May 24, 1337, Philip VI confiscated Edward III’s Duchy of Guyenne, prompting Edward to claim the French throne, igniting the Hundred Years' War.

By the mid-14th century, the Orléanais faced English raids. In 1356, the Black Prince devastated Sologne, followed by Edward III’s forces in Beauce and Gâtinais. The Grandes Compagnies, mercenary bands, seized Meung-sur-Loire’s bridge, extorting boatmen. In 1364, Orléans was so dangerous that Bishop Hugues de Fay could not enter. The Earl of Buckingham raided Gâtinais and Beauce in 1380. The 1407 assassination of Louis, Duke of Orléans, by John the Fearless of Burgundy, amid Charles VI’s madness, fueled a civil war between Armagnacs and Burgundians, weakening France.

Henry V's 1415 victory at Agincourt captured Charles of Orléans, who remained a prisoner until 1440. The 1420 Treaty of Troyes made Henry V heir to the French throne, annexing France to England. After Charles VI’s death in 1422, only a few strongholds, including Orléans, Montargis, Beaugency, and Yèvre-le-Châtel, remained loyal to Dauphin Charles VII. Driven from Paris, Charles took refuge in Montargis and Bourges, supported by Jean de Dunois, Louis of Orléans’ illegitimate son. In 1427, Dunois repelled an English siege at Montargis, a victory Charles VII called his “first stroke of good fortune,” earning Montargis the title “Montargis le Franc."

By 1428, the English controlled provinces north of the Loire and targeted Orléans to cross the river. Beauce fell, and the Earl of Salisbury seized Artenay, Patay, Meung-sur-Loire, Cléry, and Beaugency, while Châteauneuf-sur-Loire, Saint-Benoît-sur-Loire, Jargeau, and Sully-sur-Loire tightened the encirclement. On October 7, the Earl of Suffolk took Olivet, and on October 12, the Siege of Orléans began. The English captured the Tourelles bastille on October 24, cutting off Sologne and Berry. Orléans’ residents razed their suburbs and endured a harsh winter. The failed "Day of the Herrings" on February 12, 1429, left the royal army near surrender, with the situation appearing dire.

==== Joan of Arc ====
Joan of Arc at the Coronation of King Charles VII, painting by Jean-Auguste-Dominique Ingres.

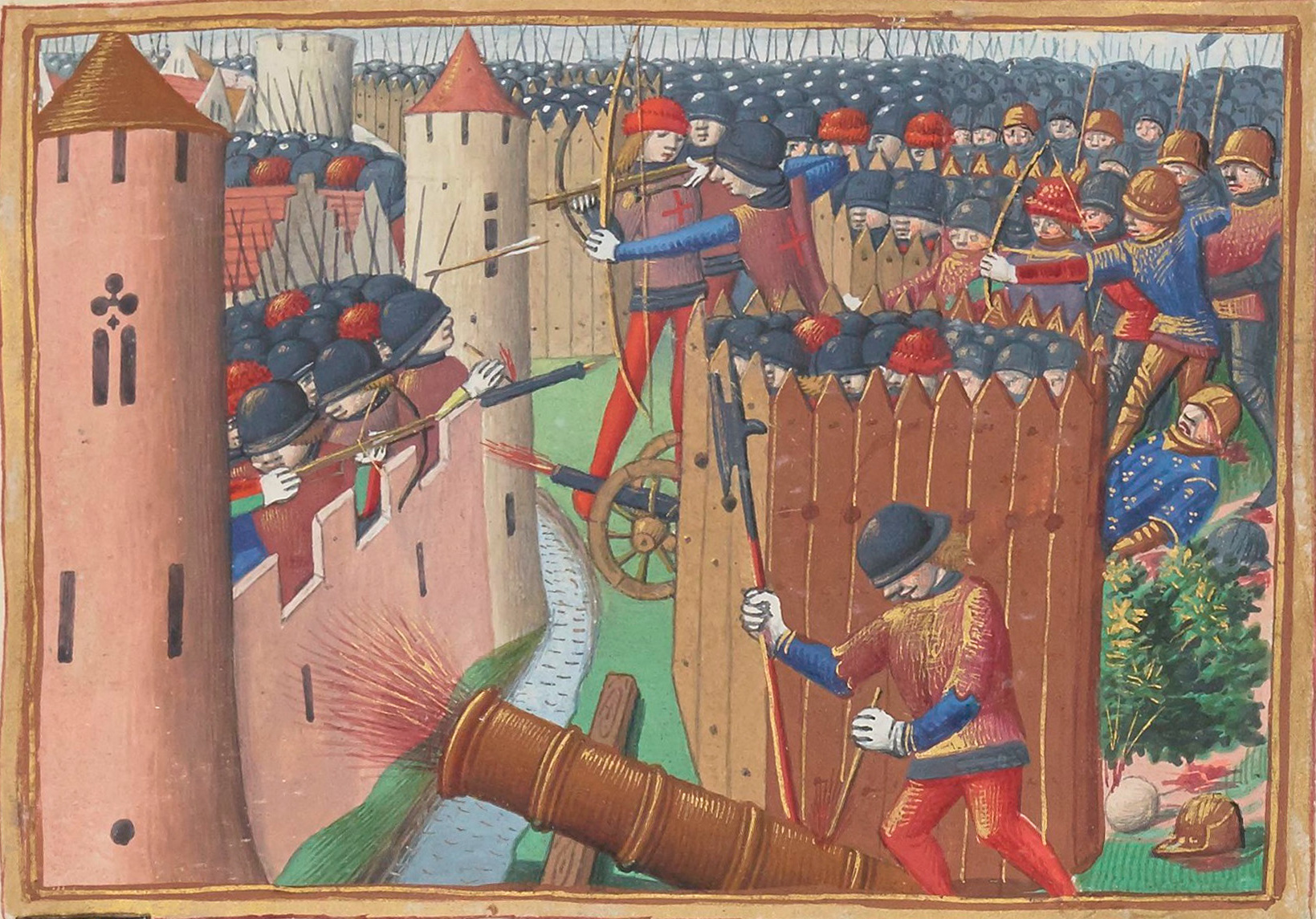
The Siege of Orléans. Illumination from the manuscript of Martial d'Auvergne, The Vigils of Charles VII, c. 1484, BnF.

Joan of Arc, a young shepherdess from Lorraine, believed she had a divine mission to ensure Charles VII's coronation in Reims. Leading a small army, she crossed the Loire at Chécy and, on April 28, bypassed English fortifications, reaching Orléans on April 29. Jean de Dunois, the city’s military leader, placed his troops under her command, reigniting hope among the people. From May 4, English strongholds fell: Bastille Saint-Loup on May 4, Bastille des Augustins on May 6, and Bastille des Tourelles on May 7, where Joan was wounded. On May 8, English commander John Talbot retreated, liberating Orléans. The city celebrated Joan as its savior, holding its first thanksgiving procession.

The English were then pushed back. The Dauphin’s army captured Jargeau on June 12, defeating William de la Pole's 5,000 troops, followed by Meung-sur-Loire on June 14, Beaugency on June 17, and Patay on June 18, where Joan defeated Talbot. The Battle of Patay concluded the Loire Valley Campaign (1428–1429), securing the region’s liberation. Charles of Orléans, however, remained a prisoner until 1441, returning to Orléans on January 24 after twelve years and a large ransom.

== Renaissance and religious unrest in the 16th century ==
=== Renaissance ===
Following the reigns of Charles VII and Louis XI, French kings established their courts in the Loire Valley, creating a dazzling and itinerant royal presence along the river. The court moved between chateaux with thousands of horses and carriages, transporting countless chests filled with essentials for a comfortable stay. Lavish festivities, a hallmark of court life, spurred the growth of luxury trade and prompted improvements to the Loire River. From Louis XII's measures supporting boatmen to the systematic construction of levees and turcies under Henry II to tame the river, these efforts facilitated the transport of goods to royal residences.

The art of construction experienced a revival. Before the arrival of new forms from Italy, the Château de Gien, remodeled between 1494 and 1500 for Anne de Beaujeu, daughter of Louis XI, retained the flamboyant Gothic style in its doorframes and decorative use of multicolored bricks. Yet, it foreshadowed a new aesthetic through its grand proportions, balanced design, short gallery, and minimal defensive features. During the second half of the 16th century, renowned theoretical architects like Jacques I Androuet du Cerceau and Philibert Delorme emerged.

Italian influences became evident in urban architecture. Religious buildings also embraced Renaissance magnificence, whether through the reconstruction of structures ruined after the Hundred Years' War or new 16th-century creations. The Church of Saint-Salomon-Saint-Grégoire in Pithiviers, destroyed by the English in 1428, was rebuilt. In Montargis, the Church of La Madeleine, ravaged by fire in 1525, was reconstructed in 1560, with the choir's redesign attributed to Jacques I Androuet du Cerceau. Some churches received partial enhancements, such as the one in Bonny-sur-Loire, where a remarkable portal with fluted columns and Corinthian capitals was added to its right side in 1543.

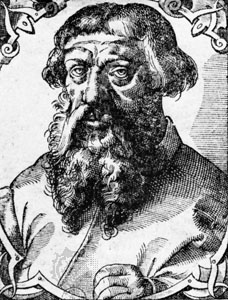
Étienne Dolet, depicted in a 16th-century engraving. Born in Orléans and later a printer in Lyon, this humanist was burned for heresy in 1546.

Alongside the rebirth of the arts, the Renaissance ushered in a revival of letters. Intellectual life in Orléans reached its zenith, largely due to the prominence of the University of Orléans. The university's success was closely tied to the advent of the city's first printing presses. The earliest book printed in Orléans, titled Manipulus curatorum (The Manual of Curates), was published on 31 March 1491 by Mathieu Vivian. In the years following this publication, Orléans appears to have been home primarily to booksellers, such as Jacques Hays and François Guyard, who commissioned rare works printed in Paris or Lyon. The first true Orléans printer, Éloi Gibier, began publishing in 1536. Louis Rabier operated in Orléans between 1563 and 1569 before relocating to Montauban and later Orthez. In 1577, Saturnin Hoto established a new printing press in Orléans, succeeding Gibier, with whom he had previously partnered.

The University of Orléans attracted students from across France and beyond, including regions such as Aquitaine, Touraine, Burgundy, Champagne, Picardy, Lorraine, Germany, Scotland, England, and Normandy. The study of Roman law, and by the early 16th century, Greek and medicine, drew luminaries such as Erasmus, Rabelais, Théodore de Bèze, and Guillaume Budé, who formed the intellectual elite of the 16th century. The prevailing humanism soon permeated the cultured circles of Orléans' aristocratic and bourgeois society.

=== Reformation ===
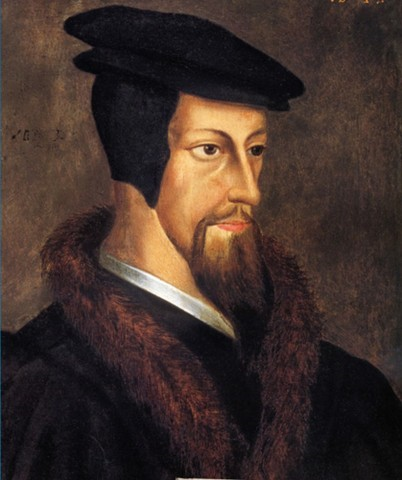
John Calvin, who studied law in Orléans from 1528 to 1533.

Under the influence of Martin Luther, Protestants challenged certain practices and the organizational structure of the Catholic Church. King Francis I wavered on whether to persecute them. Among the students of the German nation at the University of Orléans, already converts to Lutheranism, was John Calvin, who studied law there from 1528 to 1533. His ideas spread swiftly throughout the Orléanais, reaching peasants in Sologne, Catholic clergy, legal professionals, financiers like the Groslot family, and artisans. The movement gained traction among the high nobility through the Coligny brothers—Odet, Gaspard, and François—whose castle at Châtillon-sur-Loing became a haven for reformers. Renée de Ferrara, sister-in-law to Francis I, befriended Clément Marot, John Calvin, and Agrippa d'Aubigné, welcoming adherents of the new faith to Montargis. By 1555, Protestant Reformed churches were gathering followers in Pithiviers, Chilleurs-aux-Bois, and Neuville-aux-Bois. Preachers from the thriving Orléans Church, at its peak in 1558, spread Calvin's teachings to Jargeau, Sully-sur-Loire, Gien, and Montargis, while from Châtillon-sur-Loing, the Reformation extended to Château-Renard, Saint-Maurice-sur-Aveyron, and Châtillon-sur-Loire.

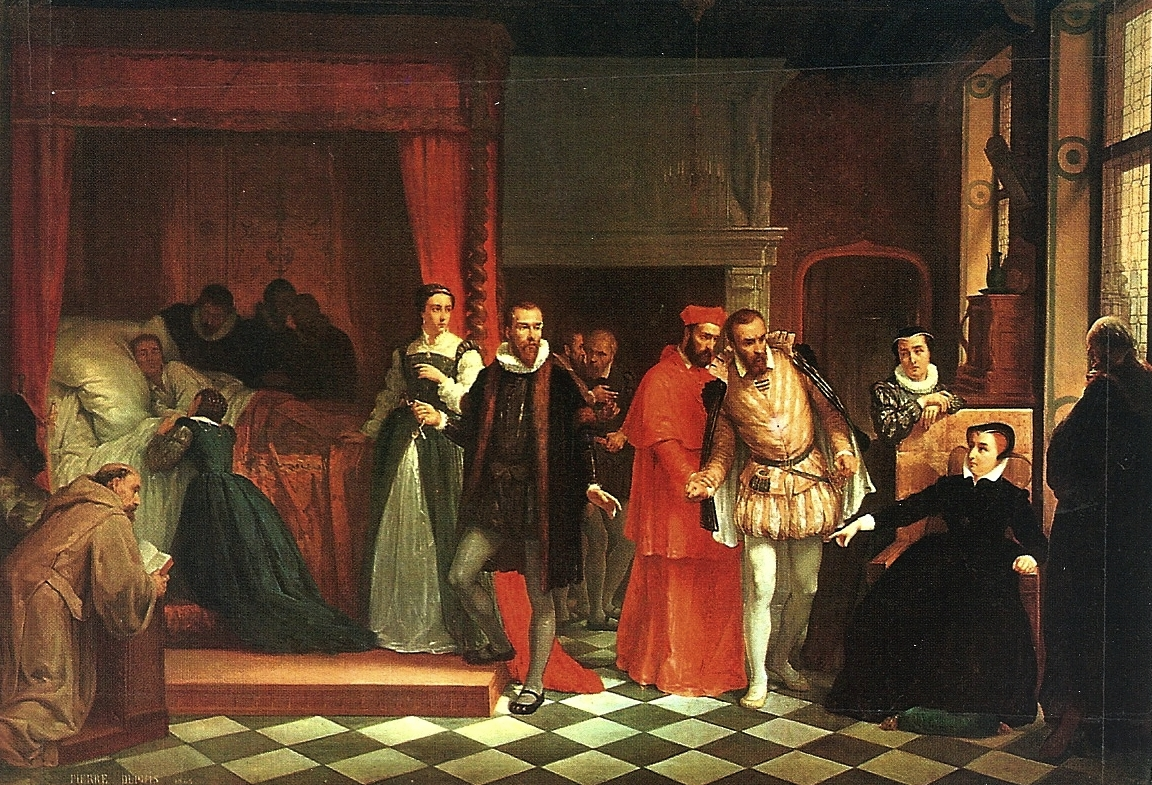
The death of Francis II in the Grande-Maison de l'Étape in Orléans in 1560.

Upon the death of Henry II in 1559, his son Francis II, aged 15 years (470 Ms), ascended the throne. Seeking to assert his authority and resolve the escalating Catholic-Protestant conflict, he convened the Estates General in Orléans in 1560—the first such assembly since 1484. However, Francis II died on December 5, 1560. His younger brother, Charles IX, aged ten, succeeded him under the regency of their mother, Catherine de' Medici. Balancing the rival Guise and Bourbon factions, Catherine freed the Protestant leader Louis I de Bourbon, Prince of Condé, who had been detained by the Guise, and assumed the role of "governess" of the kingdom. The Ordinance of Orléans, drafted by the 425 deputies present to reform the church, was notable but never enforced. War became inevitable, and on 2 April 1562, the Prince of Condé seized Orléans, establishing it as the capital of Protestantism for roughly a decade. In 1563, François de Guise, leader of the Catholic faction, laid siege to Orléans but was assassinated on February 18. With her rival eliminated, Catherine imposed the Peace of Île-aux-Bœufs (opposite La Chapelle-Saint-Mesmin) on March 10, granting limited concessions to Protestants. A brief lull followed, but a second war erupted in 1567.

==== From Saint Bartholomew's Day to the Edict of Nantes (1572–1598) ====
On 24 August 1572, during the St. Bartholomew's Day massacre, fanatical Catholics massacred Protestants in Paris. Among the victims were Admiral de Coligny and Jérôme Groslot, bailli of Orléans. The slaughter continued in Orléans the following night, marked by extreme brutality, including looting, rape, and pillage. Magistrates, lawyers, teachers, artisans, merchants, women, and children were killed, including François Taillebois, regent of the university, murdered by his own students. According to Jean-Marie Flonneau, the massacre claimed between 800 and 1000 victims in Orléans. Similar massacres occurred in Saint-Benoît-sur-Loire, Jargeau, Gien, Beaugency, and Châtillon-sur-Loire, persisting into early September. Protestantism in the Orléanais was irreparably weakened.

In 1584, Catholics formed the Holy League, led by Henry de Guise, with Orléans and Montargis as member cities. In 1587, the Protestant army, bolstered by German mercenaries, was defeated by Guise's forces at the Vimory, with the spoils shared among nearby villages and Montargis. Following the assassination of Henry III in 1589 by the monk Jacques Clément, Orléans refused to recognize Henry IV as king. Only in February 1594, a year after his abjuration of Protestantism, did the city submit when Henry IV besieged it. Thirty-five years of civil war concluded with the Edict of Nantes in 1598, granting Protestants in the Orléanais only the minor strongholds of Jargeau, Sully-sur-Loire, and Château-Renard.

== 17th century ==
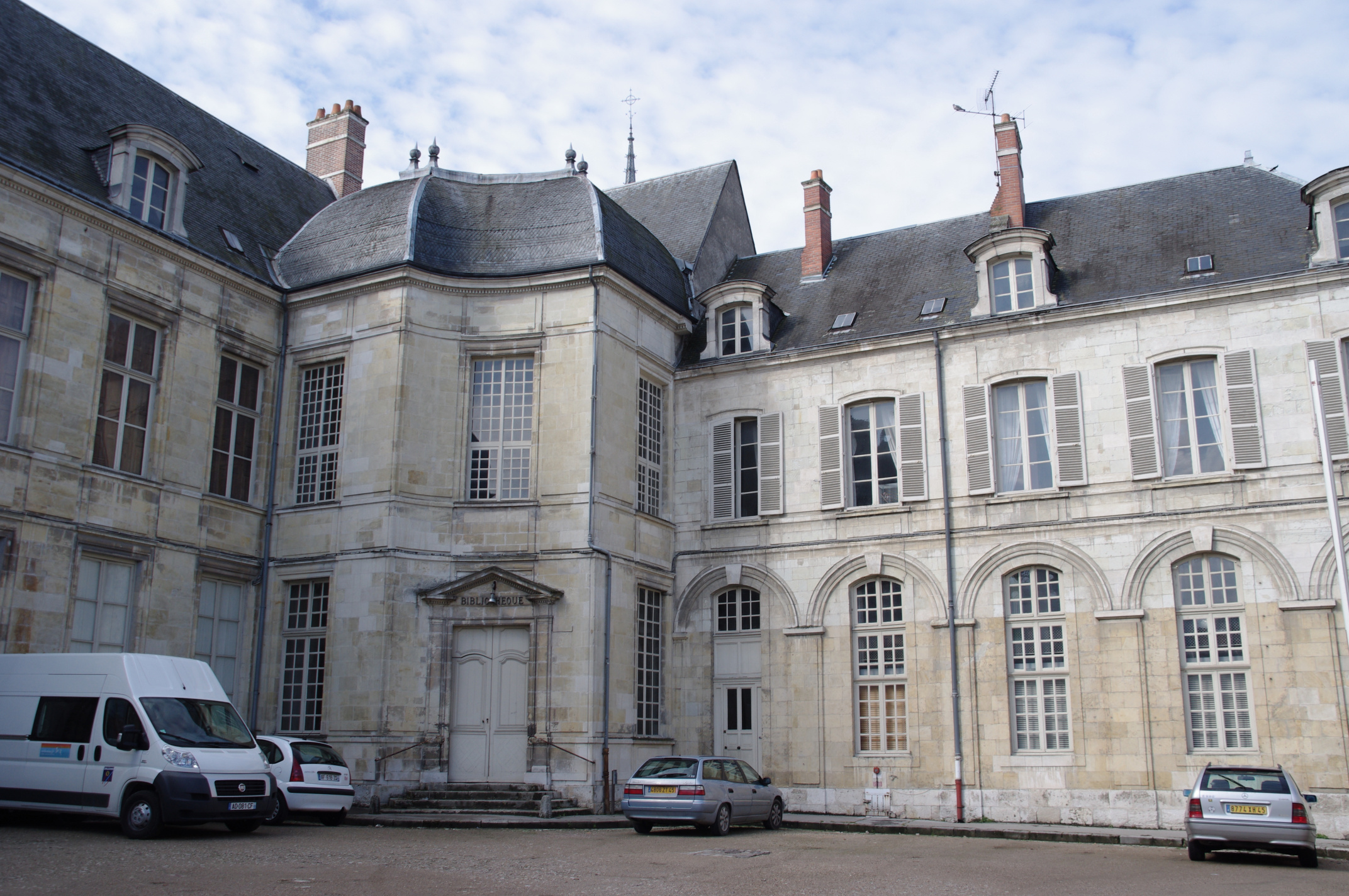
The Episcopal Palace of Orléans, constructed between 1635 and 1641.

In response to the Protestant Reformation, the Catholic Church underwent a reorganization in the latter half of the 16th century, guided by the decrees of the Council of Trent (1545–1565). This movement, known as the Counter-Reformation, brought significant changes to the Orléanais, a region deeply scarred by the French Wars of Religion. Royal support facilitated the rebuilding of ruined churches and the spiritual renewal of the faithful, spearheaded by numerous religious communities established during the Counter-Reformation.

On 24 June 1599, Henry IV returned to Orléans and pledged to restore the Cathédrale Sainte-Croix to "its former splendor." Through this commitment, he positioned himself as the restorer of the kingdom after the devastation of the religious wars, affirming the sincerity of his conversion to Catholicism. By rebuilding a majestic cathedral, he reinforced both religious and royal authority. Funding for the restoration, initiated with the laying of the first stone in 1601, came from an increase in the unpopular salt tax levied in the généralités of Orléans, Tours, Bourges, and Moulins, as well as proceeds from the jubilee celebrations of the secular year 1600–1601. The project spanned 230 years (7,300 Ms). Three other construction projects benefited from the same funding and oversight: the Saint-Euverte Church, the Saint-Aignan Collegiate Church, and the Notre-Dame de Cléry Basilica.

Religious institutions proliferated in urban centers during the first third of the 17th century. Orléans welcomed the Recollects, the Minims, the Dames de la Visitation, and teaching orders such as the Ursulines, the Oratorians, and the Jesuits, who established themselves in 1619 under the patronage of Mayor Pierre Fougeu d'Escures. Father Joseph, the "éminence grise" of Cardinal Richelieu, who had completed his novitiate with the Capuchins in Orléans, founded the Convent of the Dames du Calvaire in 1638. Similar foundations emerged across the diocese: the Feuillants Abbey in Saint-Mesmin in 1608, the Capuchins in Beaugency in 1615, and the Augustinians, invited by Baron du Tillet, who settled in La Bussière near Gien. Existing monasteries were reformed, such as the Benedictine Abbey of Saint-Benoît-sur-Loire, which adopted the Saint-Maur reform in 1627. The secular clergy was also restructured: the bishop abandoned his castle in Meung-sur-Loire and relocated to Orléans, where, during the tenures of Nicolas de Netz (1631–1646) and Alphonse d'Elbène (1646–1666), the Episcopal Palace was constructed. One of the first priorities of Bishop Henri-Charles de Coislin, appointed on 3 March 1682, was to establish a grand seminary to better train priests, equipping them to combat ignorance, heresy, and abuses.

=== Major works ===
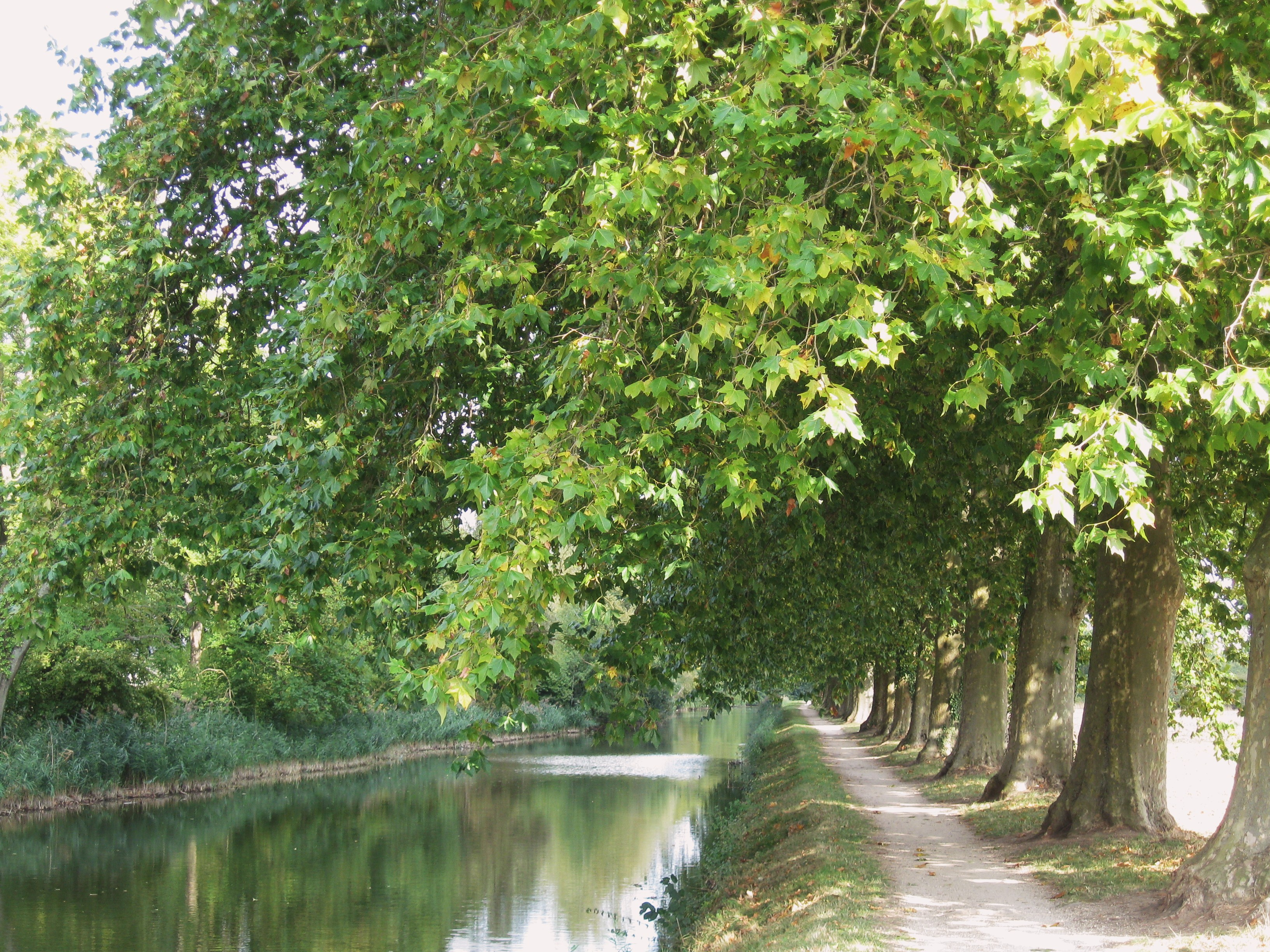
The Canal d'Orléans (view of a section in Chécy), constructed between 1681 and 1687 and inaugurated in 1692.

Appointed Grand Voyer de France by Henry IV in 1599, Sully envisioned the construction of the Canal de Briare. This ambitious project was driven by a calculated economic goal: to improve the supply of goods to Paris to prevent famines and the resulting popular unrest. The canal was part of a broader national plan to connect the Mediterranean Sea to the Atlantic Ocean, the English Channel, and the North Sea through a network of waterways. In his memoirs, Sully wrote that the aim was to create "the conjunctions of the Seine with the Loire, the Loire with the Saône, and the Saône with the Meuse, by means of which [France] would deprive Spain of two million in revenue and gain the same for itself." In 1604, Hugues Cosnier, a 31-year-old from Touraine, secured the contract. The Canal de Briare became Europe's first summit-level canal, linking two watersheds with a high point overcome by an innovative staircase of seven locks at Rogny, later replaced in 1883 with a new alignment of six more spaced-out locks. A lateral canal along the Loing was also built, running along the right bank to Châtillon-Coligny and then the left bank to Châlette-sur-Loing. However, following the death of Henry IV and Sully's fall from favor, construction halted, leaving the project abandoned for over 25 years. It was completed in 1642.

Between 1608 and 1649, the Loire River experienced more than a dozen major floods, with those in 1608 and 1629 being the most devastating. These events spurred the Service des turcies et des levées, the agency responsible for maintaining and improving the Loire's levees (known as Loire levees), to develop a comprehensive flood protection system for the middle Loire. Under Colbert's administration, it was determined that levees needed to reach a height of 22 ft (6.7 m)—approximately 8 m (26 ft)—to be fully flood-proof. In 1668, Colbert launched an extensive program to multiply and reinforce these levees across the Loire, particularly in the Loiret region. However, renewed flooding in the early 18th century halted the initiative.

The late 17th century saw the construction of another significant project: the Canal d'Orléans. In 1676, Robert Mahieu, a Parisian bourgeois and timber merchant with properties in the province of Orléanais, proposed to the Duke of Orléans to oversee for 40 years the sale of tall timber and mature stands from the Chaumontois and Milieu reserves in the Orléans Forest. His aim was to supply timber to Paris's vast market—500000 inhabitants, each consuming roughly one ton of wood annually—via a canal. Mahieu excavated an initial section between Vieilles-Maisons-sur-Joudry and Buges from 1676 to 1678, opening it for timber and coal transport. Construction of the canal to the Loire proceeded from 1681 to 1687, with its inauguration in 1692.

=== Administrative centralization and the power of intendants ===
Despite an increasingly centralized administrative policy, Henry IV and Louis XIII did not abandon the tradition of granting apanages. In 1626, the Duchy of Orléans was reconstituted for Gaston, brother of Louis XIII, and in 1660, it was reassigned to Philippe, brother of Louis XIV. His descendants retained it until the French Revolution. Meanwhile, the County of Gien was transferred in 1616 to the Duke of Guise, who later sold it to Chancellor Séguier. Another loyal servant of the Crown, Sully, acquired the estate of Sully from the La Trémoille family, which Henry IV elevated into a duchy-peerage for him.

In the early 17th century, the kingdom was divided into twenty-two généralités, each governed by intendants who wielded the monarchy's authority with growing influence. Established in 1558, the Généralité d'Orléans maintained its boundaries until the Revolution, encompassing the Orléanais, the Blésois, the Chartrain region, and the northern Nivernais. Initially, intendants were primarily financial agents with short tenures. Over time, their responsibilities expanded to encompass all facets of administration, including justice, policing, and finance. Endowed with substantial powers, they intervened in municipal affairs and even minor disputes challenging royal authority. In 1636, the king appointed the first permanent intendant, marking the beginning of a notable lineage of administrators. Among them were Jean-Jacques Charron, brother-in-law of Colbert, who served as intendant of Orléans from 1674 to 1681 before becoming intendant of Paris; Louis Bazin de Bezons, from 1681 to 1686; and, in the 18th century, Honoré Barentin (1747–1760), followed by the Perrin de Cypierre family—Jean-François-Claude Perrin de Cypierre (1760–1785) and his son Adrien Philibert Perrin de Cypierre de Chevilly (1785–1789). These intendants resided in Orléans, either at the Hôtel Groslot or the Hôtel de l'Étape on Rue de la Bretonnerie.

=== Fronde ===
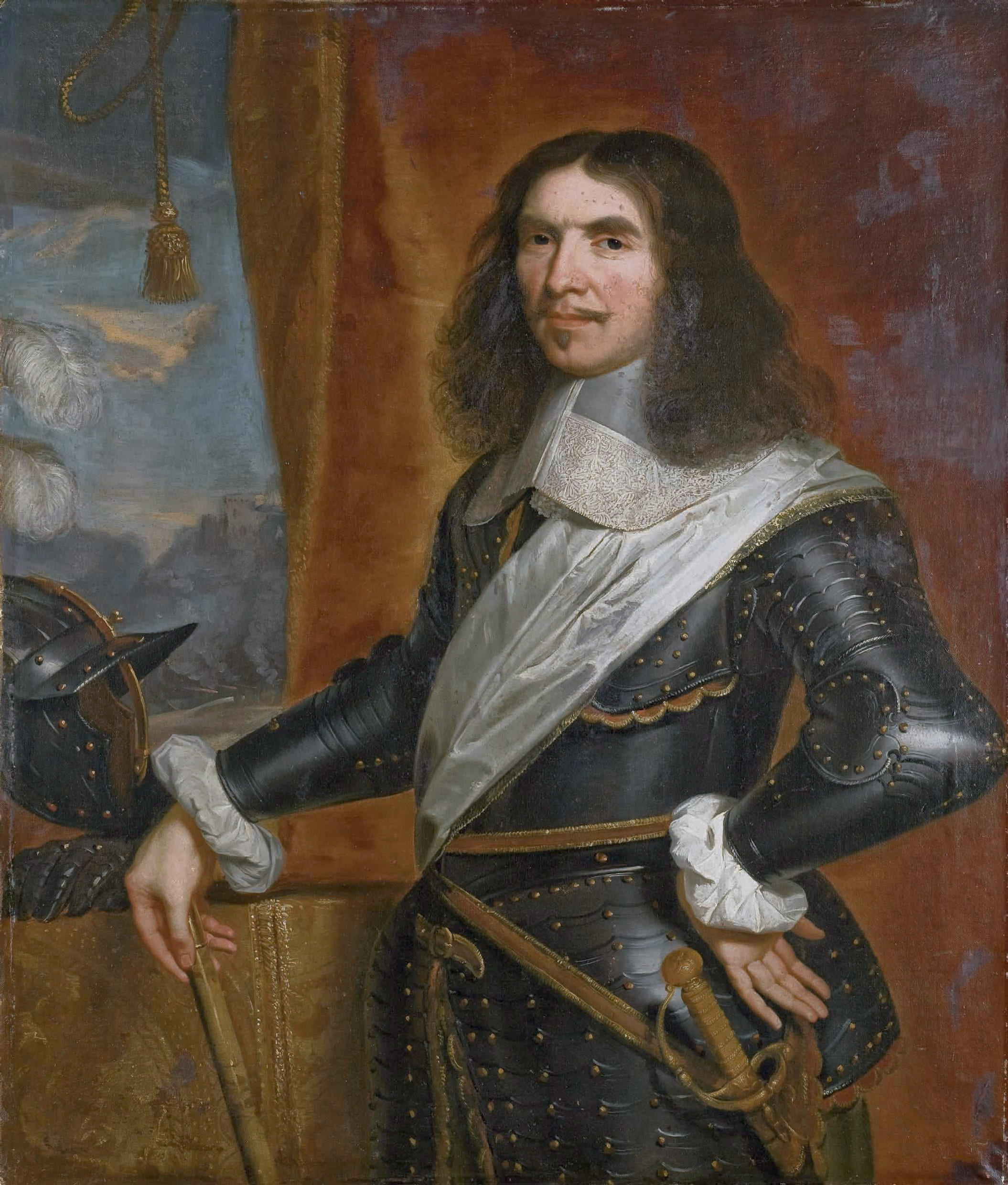
Henri de la Tour d'Auvergne, Viscount of Turenne, victor of the Battle of Bléneau, a decisive engagement that secured the throne of Louis XIV.

From 1640, the fiscal burdens of war weighed heavily on the populace. On 8 May 1642, a riot erupted in Orléans, yet the pressure persisted unabated. In the summer of 1644, the city faced a tax of 260000 pounds, which it struggled to pay. The unpopularity of Cardinal Mazarin grew further when he demanded an additional 8000 pounds as a "joyous accession gift" on behalf of the Crown. By January 1648, the Duke of Orléans was forced to establish a cavalry unit to enforce tax collection, a task made harder by poor harvests driving up bread prices. Concurrently, the Fronde, a Parisian revolt, broke out (1648–1649). While Orléans did not experience a full-scale uprising, an atmosphere of widespread anarchy took hold. Beyond the rebellious lower classes, even prominent citizens began openly expressing anti-absolutist sentiments.

In 1650, a second wave of rebellion, known as the Fronde of the Princes, coalesced around the Prince of Condé. The army of Louis XIV campaigned against the insurgents, capturing Angers, Saumur, Tours, and Blois. However, advancing along the left bank of the Loire, it could not cross at Orléans, which had aligned itself with the Fronde under the leadership of Grand Condé, a prince of the blood and cousin of the king. Intendant Legras was tasked with negotiating the entry of the royal court and army into the city. Mayor Robert Boillève replied that while Orléans would welcome the court, it refused Mazarin. To prepare for any contingency, the city's authorities reinforced its fortifications. On 23 March 1652, Frondeurs led by the Duke of Beaufort and the Duke of Nemours entered Orléans to the cheers of the populace, cementing the city's allegiance to the Fronde. This alliance, however, was a fleeting and ambiguous coalition of urban factions, torn between opposing absolutism and professing loyalty to the king—a delicate balance in mid-17th-century politics.

The young king's court, continuing along the Loire, reached the Château de Gien on 4 April 1652. Condé's army held the Gâtinais, while the royal forces, led by Marshal Turenne and Marshal d'Hocquincourt, secured Gien by positioning themselves in the Puisaye between Rogny and Bléneau. On April 7, Turenne, commanding 5000 soldiers, won the decisive Battle of Bléneau on the territory of Breteau, defeating Condé's army of 12000 soldiers. At Gien, an elated Louis XIV and his court celebrated the victors. On April 17, Louis XIV departed Gien, marching toward Paris, where he made a triumphant entry on 21 October 1652. The Fronde was conclusively ended by this victory on the fringes of the Loiret.

Further unrest flared in the mid-17th century. Between 1657 and 1658, assemblies of nobles in parts of the province, particularly Beauce, opposed Mazarin's fiscal policies and plotted Condé's return—though this time without Gaston d'Orléans's involvement. In May 1658, the "Sabotiers de Sologne" revolt—an anti-tax uprising led by peasants—erupted. The convergence of these movements briefly tipped rural Orléanais into rebellion, with Sully-sur-Loire sacked on 1 July 1658. Order was swiftly restored, however. By year's end, Mazarin's troops crushed the Sabotiers near Sully, and in December 1659, Jaucourt de Bonnesson, a Protestant noble who sought to exploit the popular revolt for political gain, was arrested and executed. The Orléanais was thereafter pacified. When the court, en route to the Pyrenees, passed through the province, it was met with respectful submission. Though subsistence riots flared again in 1661–1662, as they did across the kingdom, a new era dawned under the absolutism of the young sovereign. The Fronde's defeat paved the way: "The administrative monarchy triumphed over the dominance of clientelist networks and their dependents. The young king now governed more through his capable officials than his valiant yet overly rebellious nobility."

== 18th century ==
=== Economic prosperity ===
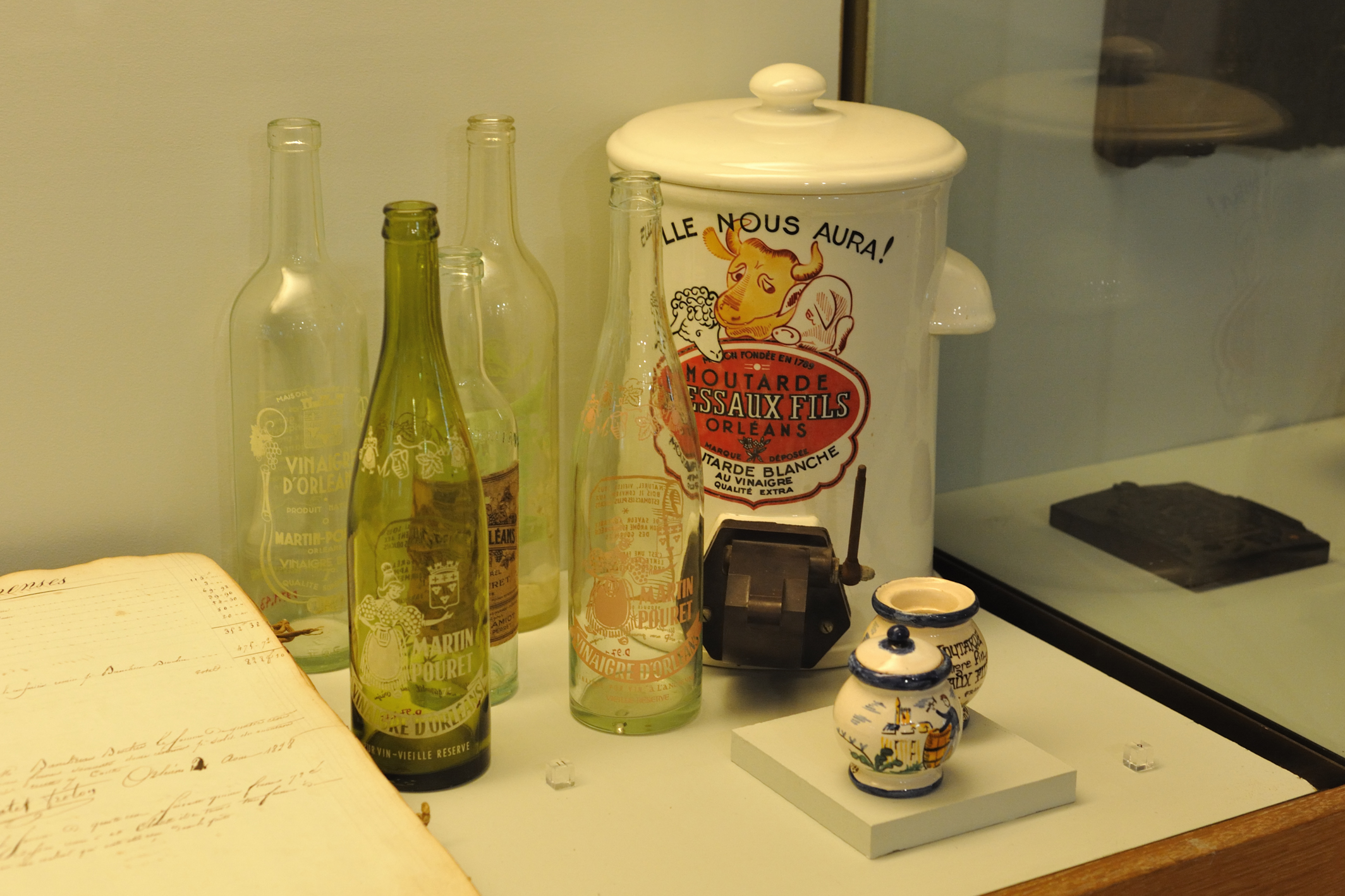
Bottles of Martin Pouret vinegar and a Dessaux Fils mustard dispenser. In the 18th century, Orléans was home to between 200 and 300 vinegar makers.

In the 18th century, the economy of the Loiret remained predominantly agricultural. Grain production thrived in Beauce, while the Loire Valley vineyards yielded substantial wine output. In contrast, the poorer soils of Sologne supported only rye and buckwheat. Gradually, sheep farming expanded in both Beauce and Sologne, producing a fine, sought-after wool. Orléans emerged as a hub of diverse industrialization, with the textile sector leading the way. Approximately 1500 workers were employed in spinning mills processing wool from Beauce and Sologne, which was exported to Geneva, Savoy, Piedmont, and even the Muslim East. By mid-century, stocking production took root, with Orléans boasting 950 looms, 55 stocking merchants, and 450 master craftsmen, employing 6000 people in the city and its environs. Toward the century's end, the cotton industry emerged in Orléans and Montargis. Cotton mills, backed by the Duke of Orléans, were established at his Motte-Sanguin residence by Englishman Foxlow. Several manufactories producing indiennes and painted fabrics also sprang up in the Orléanais, including one run by the Mainville father-and-son duo. The sheep farming encouraged since the 17th century gave rise to a robust leather industry in Orléans, processing 12000 dozen sheepskins annually by century's end.

The agro-food sector, however, was the cornerstone of wealth for many Orléans bourgeois families. In 1653, the Vandebergue family established the city's first sugar refinery, followed by about twenty more. By 1777, these produced 800000 pounds of sugar annually—the finest in the kingdom. Sugar production also spurred related trades, such as pottery workshops crafting storage jars and paper mills supplying wrapping for sugar loaves. Orléans also gained renown for its vinegar industry. Vinegar production, dating back to the Middle Ages, transformed the region's abundant, lesser-quality local wines and those from the Loire Valley. Vinegar supported between 200 and 300 vinegar makers in Orléans during the 18th century. By the early 19th century, however, competition from other cities eager to tap this lucrative trade began to challenge Orléans' dominance.

Industrialists leading these refineries and vinegar works engaged in extensive trade, leveraging river connections to Nantes and the Atlantic Ocean. The late 17th and 18th centuries marked the peak of fluvial traffic on the Loire, elevating the Port of Orléans to prominence. A denser road network complemented these waterways, with major routes linking Orléans to Paris, Chartres, and along the Loire by the 18th century. Positioned at the confluence of river and the Paris road, Orléans thrived as a warehousing hub. Its robust economy made it more populous than Tours by 1789.

Economic growth drove urbanization, particularly in Orléans. To replace the aging Pont des Tourelles, the medieval bridge serving as the sole Loire crossing, the king appointed Jean Hupeau. The new structure, then called the Royal Bridge, was built 80 m (260 ft) downstream of its predecessor. Engineer Robert Soyer oversaw construction under Hupeau's authority, with work spanning 1751 to 1763. This massive project reshaped the city, including the creation of Rue Royale between 1753 and 1760—Orléans' first significant urban planning endeavor. Across the river, islands were leveled, their soil used to build Rue Dauphine. Tree-lined promenades replaced the old ramparts, transforming Orléans into an open, modern city. Ambitious plans, such as a straight avenue highlighting the cathedral or the redevelopment of Place du Martroi, remained unrealized until the following century.

=== Age of Enlightenment ===
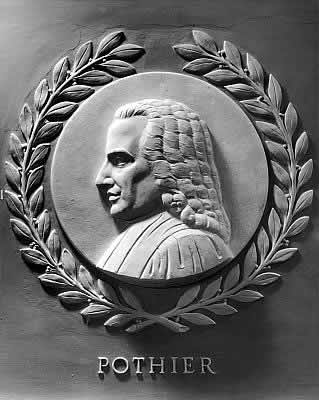
Robert-Joseph Pothier, a student of the University of Orléans and renowned jurisconsult, depicted on a bas-relief in the U.S. House of Representatives chamber.

By around 1780, the University of Orléans had dwindled to a mere handful of students. Nonetheless, it retained a legacy of distinction through figures like Jean-Baptiste Massillon, famed for his Sermons and Funeral Orations—including that for Louis XIV, delivered exactly four years before his election to the Académie Française. The university's final flourish of prestige came with Robert-Joseph Pothier, an eminent jurisconsult whose prolific legal writings included the Pandectae Justinianeae in Novum Ordinem Digestae (Pandects of Justinian in a New Order) and the Traité des obligations (Treatise on Obligations), regarded as a foundational precursor to the French Civil Code.

The university's intellectual mantle was increasingly assumed by a proliferation of learned societies emerging in the mid-18th century. As early as 1725, a society on Rue des Huguenots united jurists around Daniel Jousse. In 1741, the Episcopal Society was established, ostensibly to compile a history of Orléans, though its true aim was to combat the lingering influence of Jansenism. Three years later, in 1744, Orléans saw the founding of its first Masonic lodge, the Union Royale. Meanwhile, the local aristocracy gathered in the Royal Society of Agriculture, initiated by the intendant, while the scientific bourgeoisie frequented the Physics Society from 1781, which was elevated by royal patent in 1786 to the Royal Academy of Sciences and Fine Letters of Orléans.

Prominent figures of the era engaged with this vibrant local intelligentsia. Voltaire and Étienne Bonnot de Condillac, a luminary of the Age of Enlightenment, were among them. Condillac, who often resided at his estate near Beaugency, was a frequent visitor to Aignan-Thomas Desfriches, a merchant and enlightened art enthusiast. At his Cartaudière residence, Desfriches hosted a diverse array of notable figures from politics and the arts.

=== Revolutionary period (1789–1800) ===
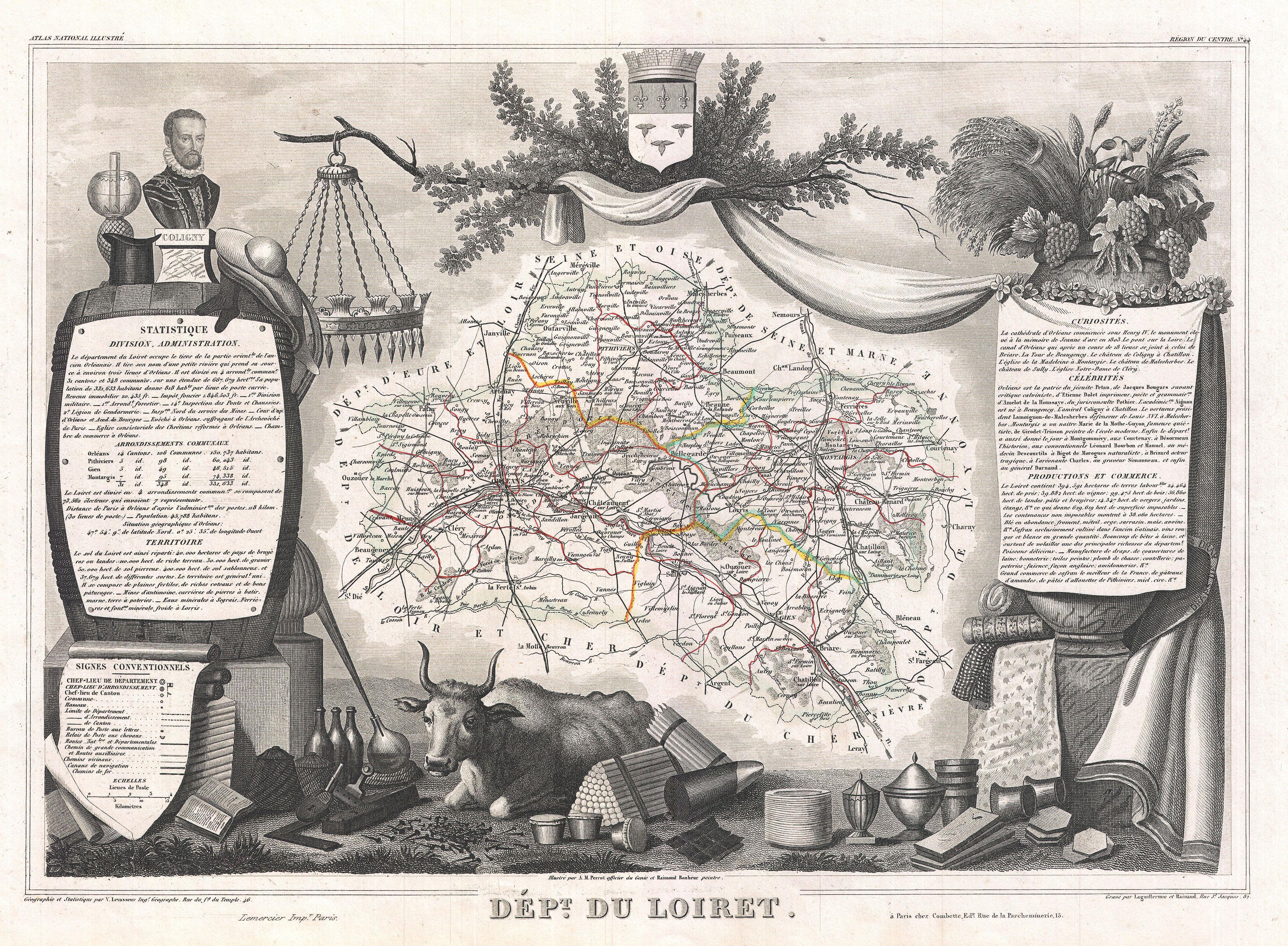
Levasseur Map of the Loiret Department (1852).

Despite a century of relative prosperity, conditions in the Loiret began to deteriorate in the 1780s, plagued by recurring shortages due to erratic weather. Local political and administrative structures showed signs of strain. The provincial assembly, established in 1787 to assist the intendant in governing the généralité, proved ineffective. Exceptionally harsh winters in 1788 and 1789, coupled with bread scarcity and a crisis impacting the woolen industry and Loire river transport, fueled widespread discontent in the Orléanais. In response, King Louis XVI summoned the Estates General, seeking solutions to the kingdom-wide crisis. Across the region's parishes, cahiers de doléances were drafted, with provincial writers demanding egalitarian reforms. Proposals for church reform were also thoughtfully considered: the clergy should better compensate priests, pay standard taxes, and abolish the casuel (fees for sacramental services). The inquiry into poverty further revealed a worsening standard of living, with 11% of the population affected by 1790—far exceeding official estimates.

Riots broke out in the Orléanais on 24 April 1789, claiming 8 lives. In Orléans, a militia of young bourgeois formed in response. Following the Storming of the Bastille, the Great Fear gripped the department, with locals dreading an aristocratic counterattack. To counter this perceived threat, spontaneous National Guards emerged in towns like Artenay, Beaugency, Boiscommun, Briare, Chilleurs-aux-Bois, and Gien, fostering alliances among neighboring villages for mutual defense. Orléans solidified its regional influence by hosting a Fête de la Fédération from May 7–9, uniting 3474 federates from adjacent departments who swore an oath at Olivet. The Loiret, in turn, sent its National Guards to the Paris Fête de la Fédération on July 14, 1790, with a simultaneous ceremony held in Orléans.

==== A New Administrative Framework ====
A persistent grievance was the convoluted administrative divisions, where fiscal, religious, and governance boundaries misaligned. The Constituent Assembly's landmark reform replaced these provincial jurisdictions with a system of departments. From the former Généralité d'Orléans, three new departments emerged: Eure-et-Loir, Loir-et-Cher, and Loiret, the latter named on 26 February 1790. The Loiret was subdivided into seven districts: Orléans, Beaugency, Neuville, Pithiviers, Montargis, Gien, and Boiscommun. Orléans transitioned from a provincial capital to a departmental prefecture, though not without contention—Montargis had vied for the title in December 1789. The new boundaries disregarded historical divisions, fragmenting Beauce across three departments and splitting Sologne between the Cher, Loir-et-Cher, and Loiret. Paris's proximity increasingly overshadowed local political life, weakened by these changes.

The Civil Constitution of the Clergy, enacted on 12 July 1790, found a relatively warm reception among the Orléanais clergy. The church's territorial structure was aligned with the new political order, matching dioceses to departments. The Diocese of Orléans lost half of Sologne but gained portions of Gâtinais from the Diocese of Sens and Giennois from the defunct Diocese of Auxerre. Urban parishes, now required to serve 6000 souls, were reduced in number, with Orléans dropping from 25 to 6 parishes. Following their bishop Jarente d'Orgeval, who took the constitutional oath, 90% of the department's priests accepted the Civil Constitution in 1790. Church properties were declared national goods on November 2, 1789, on Talleyrand's proposal, with their sale authorized between December 1789 and May 1790. This stripped the French Church of its land-based power (though sales in the Loiret remain unstudied). The sale of émigré properties further reshaped land ownership, a lasting legacy of the Revolution that continued into the 1820s under the Second Restoration. Some communal lands were also divided between 1793 and 1796.

==== Radicalization of the Revolution ====
The relative calm of the Revolution's early years in the Loiret led to Orléans being selected to host the National High Court, which convened twice: from April to September 1791 and February to September 1792. Initially, it judged "accomplices" of the king's flight, framed by the Assembly as an abduction to preserve the monarchy. Only minor figures were prosecuted and later pardoned in September when the king accepted the Constitution.

On August 10, 1792, the monarchy fell in Paris. On August 29, Léonard Bourdon, a Jacobin and ally of Robespierre, arrived in Orléans as a government commissioner. On September 3, 93 prisoners slated for trial by the High Court were transferred to Versailles, only to be massacred by a mob on September 9. On September 8, the Loiret Departmental Assembly appointed ten deputies to the National Convention. Three aligned with the Montagnards, including Bourdon, and all voted Louis XVI guilty, with four supporting his execution.

On 21 February 1793, the Convention ordered the conscription of 300,000 men to address internal and external threats. On March 15, Bourdon, now a representative on mission to the Jura with broad powers, stopped in Orléans. After clashing with National Guards, he declared the city in rebellion. On April 10, the 16th Dragoon Regiment occupied Orléans, imposing the Terror. On April 26, the Convention lifted the rebellion status, but nine individuals, falsely accused of plotting against Bourdon, were executed.

The Catholic Church faced its darkest hour. In the summer of 1794, religious buildings were requisitioned; in Orléans, the cathedral, repurposed as a Temple of Reason, hosted the Festival of the Supreme Being. Compared to other departments, the Terror's toll in the Loiret was modest: 63 deaths, including Guillaume de Malesherbes, a former minister and Louis XVI's defense counsel at his trial. After the Thermidorian Reaction, the Loiret began to heal.

== 19th century (1800–1914) ==
=== Consulate and First Empire (1799–1815) ===
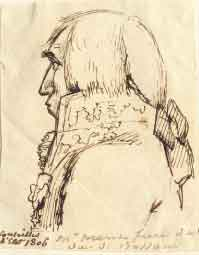
Jean Philibert Maret, the first prefect of Loiret.

The Coup of 18 Brumaire in Year VIII (November 9, 1799), led by Napoleon Bonaparte, marked the end of the Directory and the French Revolution, ushering in the Consulate and a return to relative civil peace. According to Pierre Larousse, Bonaparte symbolically "died" as a republican general on that date. Officially established on January 1, 1800 (11 Nivôse Year VIII), the Consulate effectively ended the representative and liberal republic that the Thermidorian bourgeoisie had sought to create. Fear of popular forces paved the way for a Caesar-like monarchy.

The Law of 28 Pluviôse Year VIII (February 19, 1800) reorganized local administration, most notably by establishing the position of prefects. While retaining the departments inherited from the Revolution, it redefined their internal divisions: districts were transformed into arrondissements, the commune was formalized, and the canton was introduced. Each administrative level featured an appointed public official and an elected consultative assembly. Jean Philibert Maret, the first prefect of Loiret, assumed his role on March 30, 1800. The department's seven districts were reorganized into four arrondissements: Pithiviers, Orléans, Montargis, and Gien. In 1926, the arrondissements of Gien and Pithiviers were abolished, though Pithiviers was reinstated in 1942.

The Napoleonic Wars had limited direct impact on Loiret, with only troop levies and the Continental Blockade briefly disrupting Orléans' trade. However, in 1814, during Napoleon's collapse, Allied forces invaded Paris and reached the Gâtinais region. Cossacks pillaged Pithiviers, Gien, and Châteauneuf-sur-Loire, though Orléans was spared. The Empress and her son arrived in Orléans on February 12, departing the same day to join the Austrian Emperor. That day, local authorities pledged allegiance to Louis XVIII. Following the Battle of Waterloo in July 1815, remnants of the French army, led by Marshal Davout, retreated south of the Loire to La Source, while their adversaries occupied the right bank. On August 1, Davout submitted to the king with the remnants of the imperial army.

=== Restoration and constitutional monarchy (1815–1848) ===
The Restoration ushered in an era of subdued political life. In 1815, Loiret sent four royalists to the Chamber of the Unfindable: two from Orléans, one from Pithiviers, and one from Montargis. After the Chamber's dissolution in 1816, Loiret elected only three royalist deputies. In 1820, a grand college of two additional deputies was introduced, raising the total to five. All elected representatives in 1824 remained royalists, but in 1827, liberals achieved nationwide success, securing four of Loiret's five seats: Cormenin in Orléans, Laisné de Villevèque in Pithiviers, Alexandre Périer in Montargis, and Crignon de Montigny for one of the grand college seats. The royalists retained only the second grand college seat with Louis Alexandre du Gaigneau de Champvallins. After Charles X dissolved the Chamber in 1830, liberals swept all five seats, with Gabriel-Marie de Riccé replacing Champvallins. Proclaimed on August 9, 1830, following the Three Glorious Days, the July Monarchy (1830–1848) succeeded the Restoration. Louis-Philippe, crowned King of the French, merged the restituted estates of the Duke of Orléans — granted by Louis XVIII — into the state domain, abolishing this obsolete institution in 1832.

By 1848, economic discontent eroded support for the July Monarchy. Between February 22 and 25, spurred by liberals and republicans, Parisians revolted after a shooting, seizing the capital. Refusing to fire on the crowd, Louis-Philippe abdicated on February 24 in favor of his grandson, Philippe d'Orléans. In Loiret, unrest briefly flared but quickly subsided. In the December 10 presidential election, with an 87% turnout, Loiret gave 64,722 votes (90%) to Louis-Napoléon Bonaparte.

=== Second Republic and Second Empire (1848–1870) ===
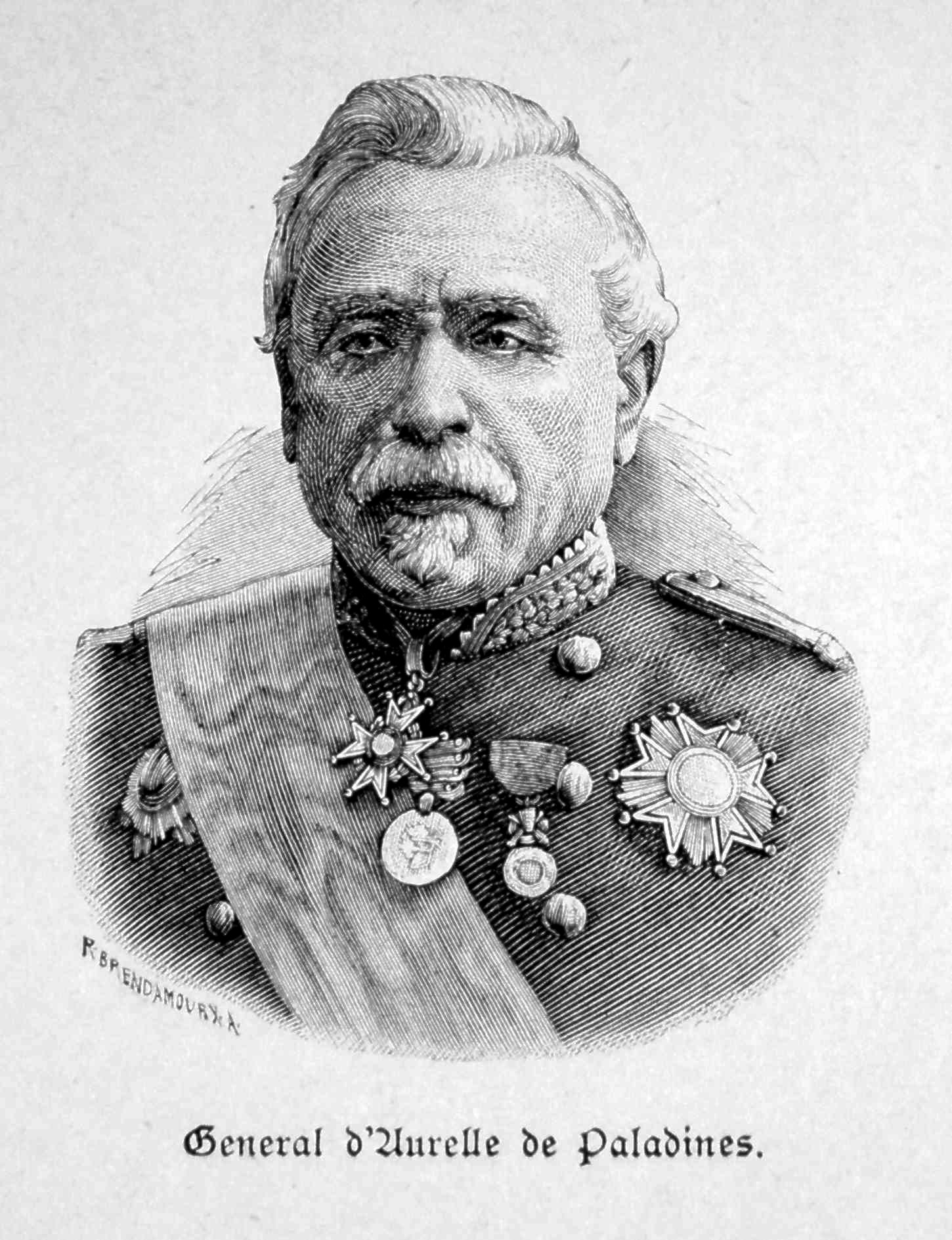
General d’Aurelle de Paladines, victor of the Battle of Coulmiers on November 9, 1870.

Following Napoleon III's Coup of 2 December 1851, Loiret was among the few departments to resist, prompting its placement under a state of siege alongside 31 others to prevent widespread uprisings. Violent republican protests erupted in Montargis, Briare, Bonny-sur-Loire, Chécy, and Orléans, which had previously given a cool reception to the prince-president during a propaganda tour. The establishment of the Second Empire quelled dissent. Over 500 opponents were arrested in Loiret, with 229 deported—two to Cayenne and 227 to Algeria. Repression targeted peasants, artisans, and the petty bourgeoisie. In the plebiscite of December 20, 1851, Loiret endorsed the coup, giving Louis-Napoléon Bonaparte 74,818 "yes" votes.

Peace prevailed until the Franco-Prussian War of 1870 pitted France against the Kingdom of Prussia. Loiret became a battleground: despite fierce resistance at Artenay, the outskirts of Orléans (Les Aubrais and Les Aydes), and Saint-Jean-de-la-Ruelle, Orléans fell on October 11, 1870. The French retreated to Salbris, where reinforcements arrived. Under General d'Aurelle de Paladines, the French triumphed at the Battle of Coulmiers on November 9, but were defeated at the Battle of Beaune-la-Rolande on November 28. Prussian occupation of the department lasted from January 6 to March 16, 1871.

=== Third Republic (1870–1914) ===
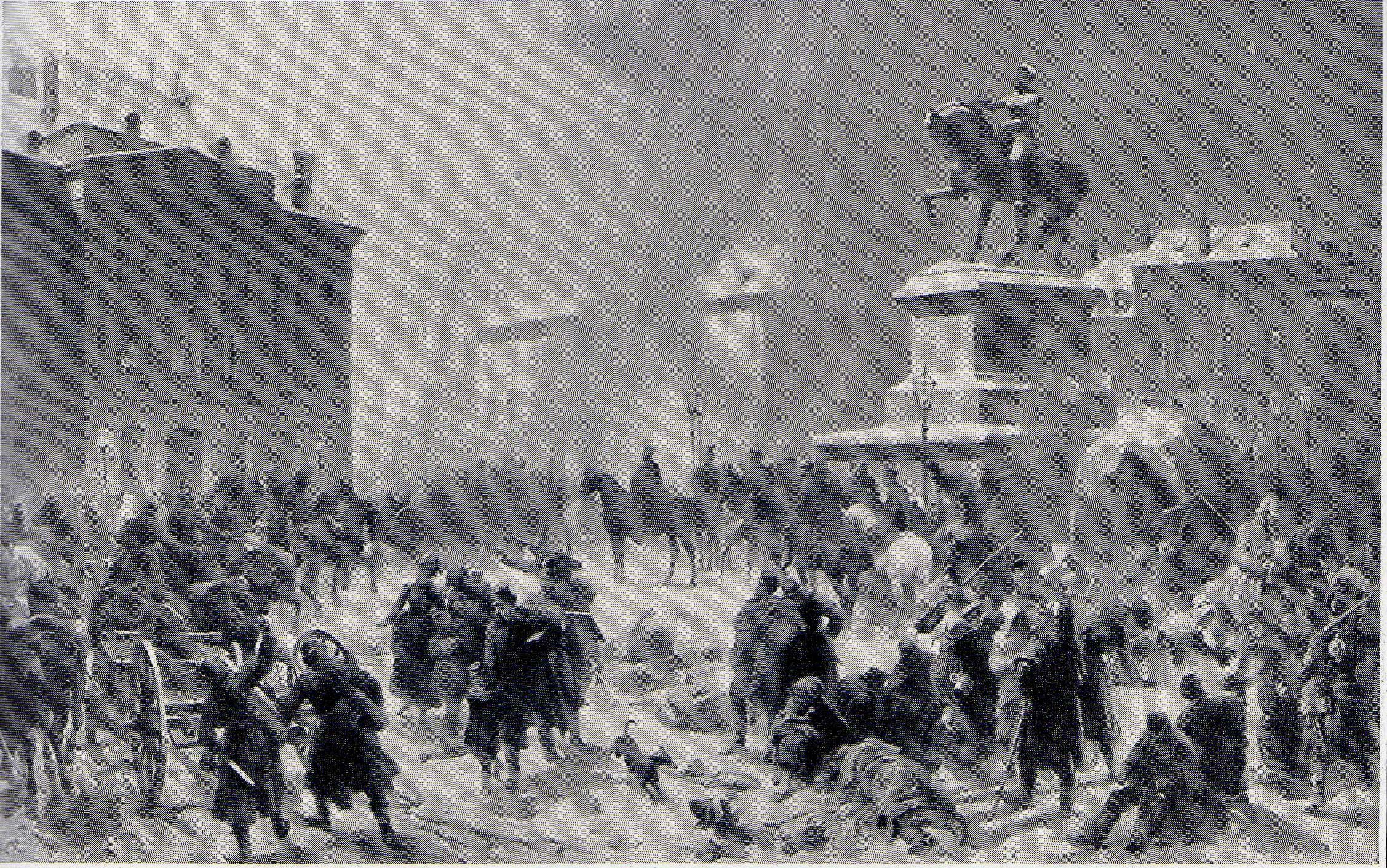
Entry of the Germans into Orléans, 1870. Painting by Ludwig Braun.

After the Treaty of Frankfurt on May 10, 1871, Loiret rebuilt swiftly, returning to normalcy. The Third Republic saw moderate republicans dominate Loiret's political scene, including Eugène Fousset (deputy for Orléans-1, 1879–1888; senator, 1888–1900), Adolphe Cochery (deputy for Montargis, 1869–1885; senator, 1888–1900; first Minister of Posts in 1879), Guillaume Devade (deputy for Gien, 1876–1888), and Mesmin Bernier (deputy for Orléans-2, 1876–1889).

In 1879, Jules Ferry, Minister of Public Instruction and a Freemason committed to secularism, sought to wrest education from Church influence, reversing concessions made under the Falloux Laws (1850). On March 15, 1879, he proposed two bills, including the famous Article 7: "No one may participate in public or private education or direct any educational institution if they belong to an unauthorized religious congregation." Though the Senate struck down Article 7, congregations retained teaching rights. In Loiret, one-fifth of public primary schools (then called communal schools) had directors or staff from religious orders. Nonetheless, on March 18, 1880, the government issued two decrees: one giving Jesuits three months to disband, the other dissolving all congregational educational institutions. This sparked a "school war." Of the 40 religious communities in the Orléans diocese, four were dissolved, but further actions ceased.

The Law of 1 July 1901, regulating voluntary associations and religious congregations, tightened controls, disrupting the 1880 modus vivendi. Loiret deputy Fernand Rabier (1888–1919), a radical and Freemason, zealously enforced the 1901 law expelling congregations and the December 9, 1905 law mandating clergy property inventories, despite widespread sympathy for the Church. As Orléans municipal councilor (1912–1919), he sharply distinguished the secular commemoration of the city's liberation by Joan of Arc outside the cathedral from the religious one inside.

=== Modernization of the economy ===
Agricultural advancements in agronomy and the adoption of more efficient equipment significantly boosted farming in Loiret. In Beauce, cereal cultivation remained dominant, though some arable land shifted to growing sugar beets. The practice of fallow declined across the region, particularly in the Loire Valley, where fertile lands were now safeguarded from flooding by the levees of the Loire. The rich area between Sologne and Beauce became almost entirely devoted to open-field crops such as asparagus, beans, and potatoes, a trend also evident in Gâtinais. The widespread use of fertilizers, combined with mechanization, markedly increased productivity. However, this rise in yields came at a cost: mechanization, replacing human labor, triggered a rural exodus that partially depopulated the countryside.

Vineyards thrived in the western Orléans Valley. Yet, a major agricultural crisis struck late in the 19th century with the phylloxera epidemic. Originating in Languedoc, the phylloxera infestation reached Loiret in 1876, reducing vineyard coverage from 32,000 hectares in 1875 to 19,978 hectares by 1982. The century's end also saw the disappearance of saffron cultivation, introduced in the 14th century, and forest devastation caused by the harsh winter of 1878–1879.

End of sail-based navigation for freight transport to the capital: comparison between the end of Louis XIV's reign and 1838 (steam navigation on the Seine from Rouen).

The transformation of transportation profoundly reshaped Loiret's economy. Roads, in dismal condition during the Revolution, underwent significant upgrades. By the July Monarchy, the departmental road network was nearly complete, and construction began on major communication routes. Road freight transport expanded, only to face stiff competition from the railway. After over a decade of planning and construction, the Paris-Orléans line opened on May 2, 1843, followed by the Orléans-Tours line on April 1, 1846, and the Orléans-Vierzon line on November 15, 1847. Between 1844 and 1851, horse-drawn freight transport on the Paris-Orléans-Vierzon route plummeted by 80%.

The Loire river trade, which had fueled Orléans' commerce under the Ancien Régime, enjoyed its final heyday. Efforts to modernize river transport included the launch of a regular steamboat service between Orléans and Nantes on May 1, 1829. Though traffic had declined since the Ancien Régime and Empire—when 4,000 to 5,000 boats plied the river—about 1,000 sailing vessels still operated between Briare and Nantes. The introduction of steamboat companies like the Inexplosibles de la Basse-Loire and Haute-Loire, established between 1840 and 1843, failed to halt the river's decline, hampered by its unpredictable nature. Downstream traffic persisted briefly but ceased entirely by 1880.

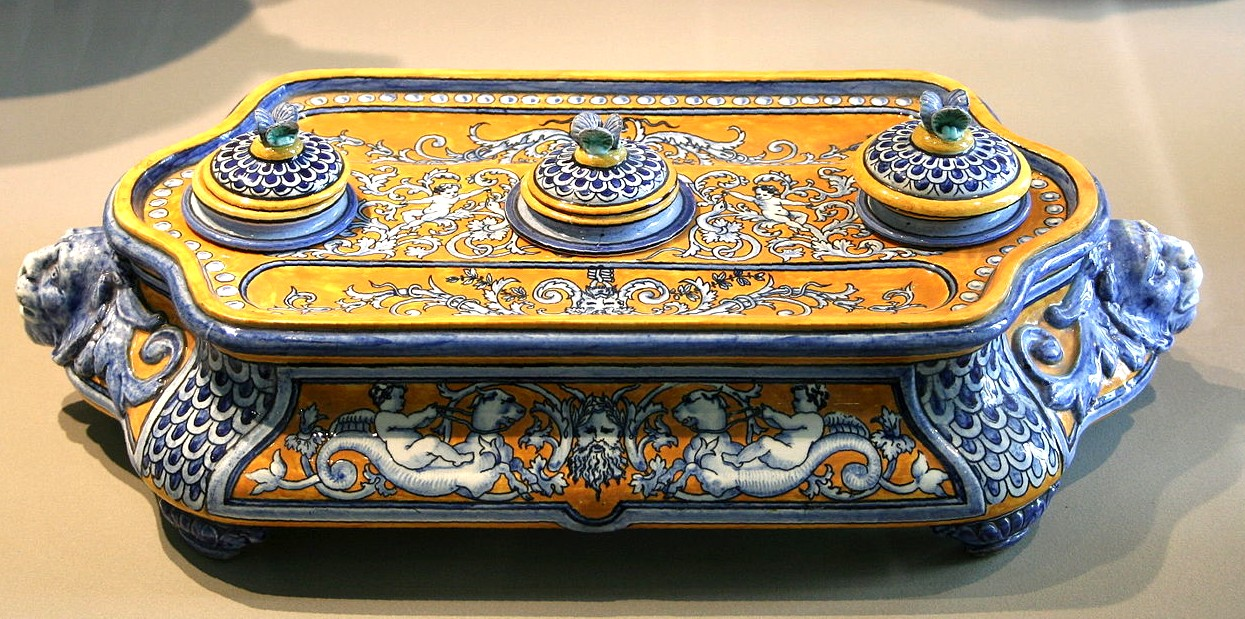
Gien faience inkwell. The Gien Faience Factory was founded in 1821 by Englishman Hall.

Lacking significant mineral resources, Loiret missed the Industrial Revolution driven by coal, iron, cast iron, and steel. However, since the 18th century, it had developed a flexible, diverse industrial base, which stagnated or declined in the early 19th century. In Orléans, the number of wool manufactories, cotton mills, and cane sugar refineries dwindled, with the latter vanishing by 1850. Improved transportation and Parisian centralization shifted industrial and commercial activity to the capital and the Seine Valley, while Orléans' bourgeoisie redirected investments into land and stock speculation.

Montargis saw its paper industry and textile industry falter. In 1808, Parisian textile merchant Jean-Bernard Cardon purchased two paper mills in Montargis. He retained the Buges mill, operational for another 75 years, and converted the Langlée mill into a cotton spinning factory employing 600 workers by 1824. After Cardon's death in 1832, English competition weakened the Langlée mill, which closed in 1845.

Despite early setbacks, innovative industrialists emerged. In Orléans, the Gravier cannery adopted Nicolas Appert's "appertization" process in 1810, replacing traditional salting and drying methods. In 1821, Englishman Hall founded the Gien faience factory, whose tiles later adorned Paris Métro stations.

In the latter half of the 19th century, Loiret's industrialization grew through diverse light industries—food processing, textiles, metallurgy, mechanics, and chemicals—rather than heavy industry. Orléans produced a third of France's wine vinegar, shifted from knitting to clothing and corset manufacturing, and expanded blanket weaving to supply half of France's military blankets. New sectors like metalworking and mechanics emerged, fueled by agricultural modernization and the Second Industrial Revolution of petroleum and electricity. Beauce's large-scale farming spurred agricultural machinery firms. In Châteauneuf-sur-Loire, engineer Ferdinand Arnodin established a company building transporter bridges and suspension bridges, employing skilled workers displaced by the river trade's decline. Orléans joined the automotive age through Delaugère et Clayette. In 1845, Parisian ceramic button maker Jean-Félix Bapterosses expanded to Briare, mass-producing beads, buttons, and mosaics. In 1853, American Hiram Hutchinson revived the Montargois economy by leasing the abandoned Langlée factory to produce rubber goods using Charles Goodyear's patents, an operation still active today.

== 20th century ==
=== First World War ===
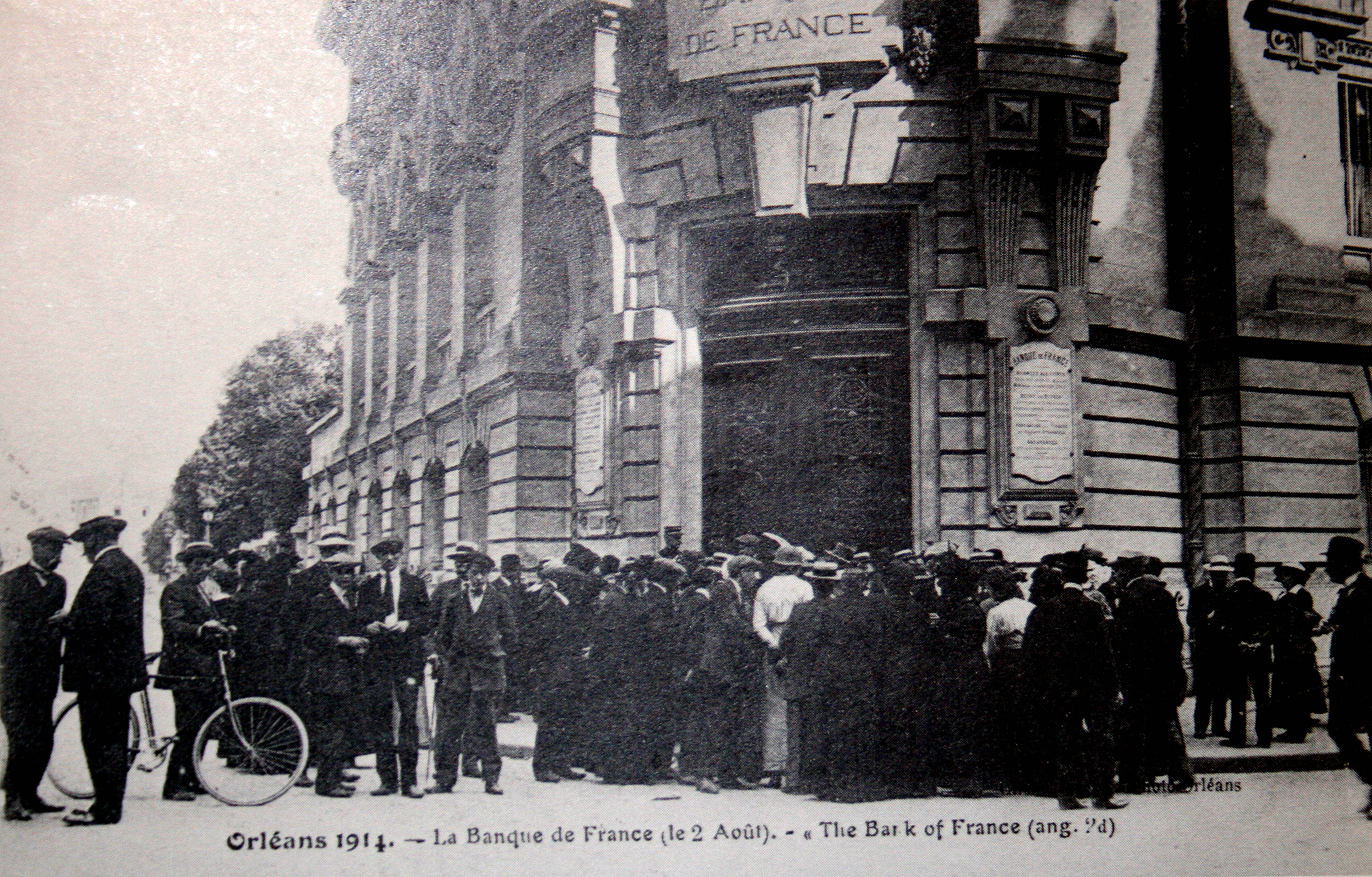
Queue outside the Banque de France in Orléans on August 2, 1914, the day of general mobilization in France.

On July 29, Russia unilaterally declared partial mobilization against Austria-Hungary. The following day, July 30, and in the days that followed, panic gripped Orléans as residents besieged the Banque de France to exchange paper notes for metal coins. On Saturday, August 1, 1914, in the afternoon, France announced general mobilization effective August 2. Church bells tolled the alarm, plunging the stunned population into dismay. Trains loaded with conscripts and supplies departed from Orléans station toward the northeastern front. By August 10, refugees and wounded soldiers began arriving. In towns, school buildings were converted into hospitals to treat the flood of casualties, while rural communities rallied to complete harvests and fulfill requisitions for rye, oats, and straw.

In September, the Germans gained the upper hand until the First Battle of the Marne (September 6–10) halted their advance, ushering in a grueling trench war. Many conscripts met tragic fates, with France suffering the third-highest toll of wounded, dead, and missing after Russia and Germany. The war effort mobilized all available resources—elderly men, women, and children stepped in as able-bodied men were called away. The conflict's duration strained rural areas, where the army requisitioned 10,000 to 12,000 horses between 1914 and 1916, compounding the labor shortage. Industry adapted similarly, with factories retooled for war production. With young men at the front, retirees, discharged soldiers, returning wounded, and especially women filled the workforce. The "women wattmen" driving Orléans' trams became a visible symbol of this shift. Later, prisoners of war and colonial and foreign labor—such as Kabyles at the Pithiviers sugar refinery and Indochinese workers in Orléans—were increasingly employed.

During the winter of 1914–1915, British troops, including Indian soldiers like the renowned Bengal Lancers, arrived and encamped between Olivet and Saint-Cyr-en-Val. By 1916, shortages emerged, prompting the introduction of individual food ration cards and a national bread card on April 15, 1918.

The Armistice of 11 November 1918 ended hostilities. Victory celebrations were scheduled for August 3, 1919, with the 131st Infantry Regiment, credited with "nearly saving France at Noyon from March 23–26, 1918," parading triumphantly through Orléans. Relative to its mobilized population, Orléans' 5th military region suffered France's highest loss rate at 20.2% (47,600 killed or missing out of 235,000 mobilized), compared to the national average of 16.1%.

=== Interwar period ===
In the aftermath of World War I, Loiret faced significant demographic and economic challenges. The population, which stood at 364,061 in 1911, dropped to 337,224 by 1921, a decline of over 7%. Returning soldiers bore physical scars—mutilation and injuries from mustard gas—and widespread psychological trauma. Solidarity among war victims led to the creation of two associations: the Mutilés du Loiret (Loiret Disabled Veterans), which grew to 7,000 members, and the Union des Combattants du Loiret (Loiret Combatants' Union), reaching 16,000.

Industries geared entirely toward the war effort struggled to adapt. The Ambert factory, built in 1917 by the Compagnie générale d'électricité to produce grenades, transitioned to manufacturing electric motors. Mechanical industries shifted to agricultural machinery, but textile firms, particularly those making military blankets, faltered under British competition. Smaller businesses faced even greater difficulties.

By 1924, the political climate shifted. Discontent with the economic policies of the National Bloc (1919–1924) drove French voters leftward. In January, three renewable Radical senators—Fernand Rabier, Henri Roy, and Marcel Donon, mayor of Pithiviers—won easy victories. In 1926, President Gaston Doumergue tasked Raymond Poincaré with forming a national unity government on July 22 to revive a faltering economy. This administration reformed a territorial structure deemed too costly, abolishing the arrondissements of Gien and Pithiviers by decree on September 10, 1926.

By the late 1920s, anti-parliamentarism surged among the middle classes across France, fueled by perceived or real collusion between politicians and corrupt financiers. The Hanau affair in 1928 and the Stavisky Affair in 1934—scandals that defrauded many small savers—rocked the nation and tarnished Loiret. Orléans' mayor, Eugène Turbat, a Radical Socialist and thus suspect to the right, repeatedly defended himself in the press against accusations of suppressing these scandals.

Until the early 1930s, Loiret leaned center-left, dominated by the Radical Party, while the French Section of the Workers' International (SFIO) and French Communist Party remained weak. The February 6, 1934 riot in Paris, which left 16 dead, sparked outrage in Loiret, followed by organized anti-fascist resistance. Rallies and protests drew thousands, and within a year, 77 committees with 5,000 members emerged—among the highest figures in France. Plans for armed resistance to a potential fascist coup d'état were drafted. By February 1935, this activism produced a local Popular Front program, ahead of the national movement. However, the Popular Front's struggles from 1936 onward led to the rapid decline of Loiret's antifascist committees. Despite Jean Zay's October 1938 speech on Édouard Daladier's policies before the Orléans committee, their collapse was evident by 1939.

==== Spanish refugees ====
During the 1930s, Loiret sheltered numerous Spanish refugees. In 1934, 235 Asturian insurgents arrived in Orléans.

The aid advanced by Orléans' municipality went unrepaid by 1936, when the first refugees of the Spanish Civil War arrived. Between January 29 and February 8, 1939, over 2,800 Spanish refugees fleeing the collapse of the Second Spanish Republic before Francisco Franco's forces reached Loiret. Overwhelmed, Orléans opened 46 rural reception centers. The glassworks camp at Les Aydes in Fleury-les-Aubrais initially offered only shelter and basic supplies—a single stove per dormitory, with beds added gradually. Most refugees in Loiret were women and children; men were disarmed and detained in southern France. Those in Loiret faced strict quarantine, mandatory vaccinations, restricted mail, and monotonous French-style rations, though food was guaranteed. A historian noted the "bewildering foods" for Spaniards. By February 6, hospitals in Beaugency and Orléans were overrun, prompting temporary infirmaries and eventually a field hospital at the Saint-Marceau tram station.

Left-wing political groups (PCF and Communist Youth) and unions mobilized extensively, joined by the Orléans League of Human Rights. Even the right-wing French Social Party rallied support in 1939. Loiret's refugees received unique humanitarian aid from the Quakers, who regularly visited the La Verrerie camp.

Encouraged by the French government's repatriation efforts, some refugees returned to Spain, while others were consolidated at La Verrerie. Many remained through December. With war looming, the camp's closure, initially set for March 10, was delayed to June 1. Like much of France, the refugees were swept into the exodus triggered by the French army's collapse.

=== Second World War ===
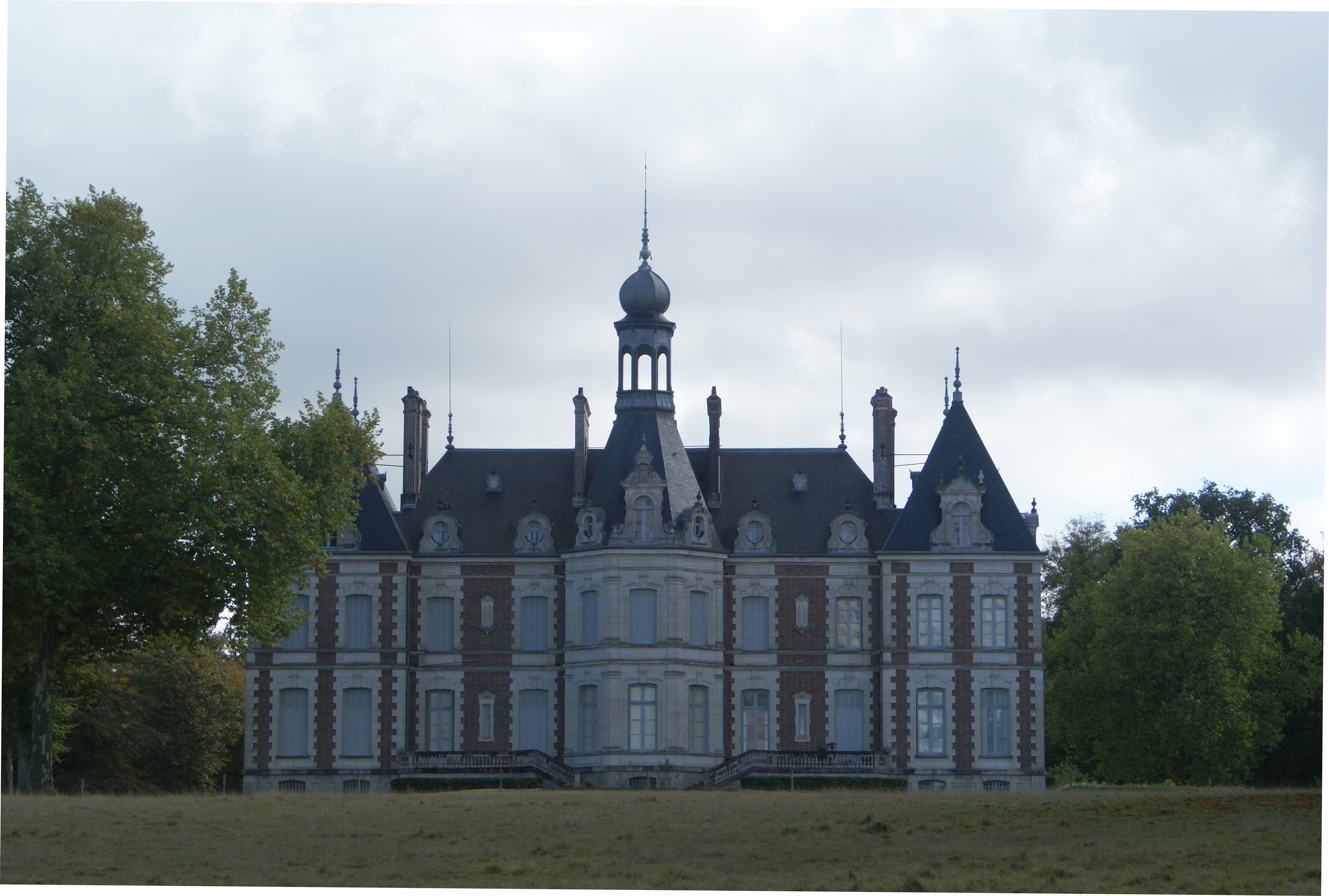
The Château du Muguet, site of the Briare Conference.

From autumn 1939 to spring 1940, the swift collapse of Poland and the Soviet Union's role in its partition heightened fears of the enemy, dividing public opinion over France's military inaction during the Phoney War. Loiret seemed distant from the front, but the German offensive on the Meuse brought streams of refugees from the North and Ardennes.

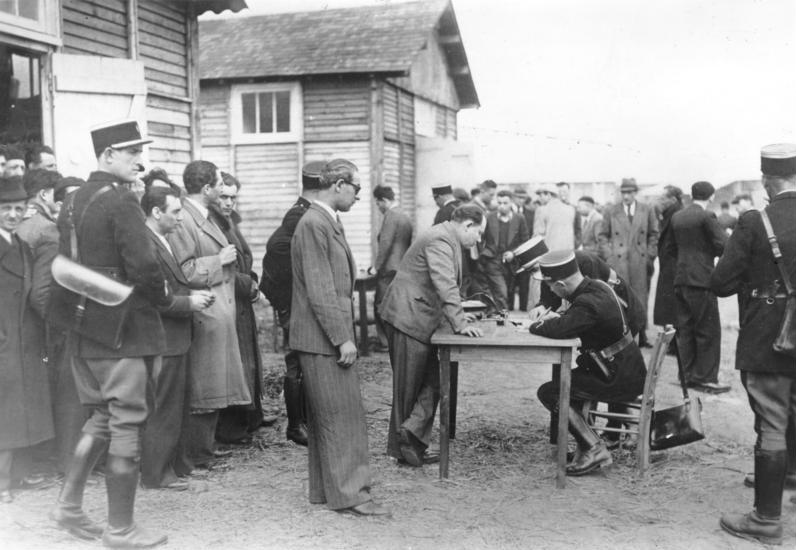
French police registering victims of the Green Ticket Roundup upon arrival at Pithiviers camp.

The French army's general staff, stationed near Briare at the Château du Muguet, attempted to establish a defensive line along the Loire. French troops took positions in Orléans, Beaugency, Sully-sur-Loire, Châteauneuf-sur-Loire, and Saint-Denis-de-l'Hôtel. The Briare Conference, held on June 11 and 12, 1940, was the penultimate meeting of the Supreme War Council. It marked the second encounter between Charles de Gaulle and Winston Churchill. On June 14, the area south of the Loire was evacuated, triggering a mass exodus as towns and villages emptied. Enemy aircraft began bombing Orléans in the night of June 14–15, and German troops entered the city on June 16, 1940. That same day, Marshal Pétain formed a government in Bordeaux, its first act being to request an armistice, signed on June 22.

Incorporated into the occupied zone, Loiret fell under German military administration. A Feldkommandantur (military prefecture) was established in Orléans on Rue de la Bretonnerie, overseeing Loiret, Loir-et-Cher, Eure-et-Loir, and the occupied portion of Cher until April 1942. The population endured the occupation with resignation, though unease grew when Pétain met Adolf Hitler at Montoire on October 24, 1940. Historian Jean-Louis Panné notes, "Pétain had no choice but collaboration if he wished to remain relevant," yet he "deluded himself about the benefits of state collaboration" following this meeting. Recalled to power in April 1942, Pierre Laval further eroded support for the regime with his June 22 radio address, declaring, "I hope for Germany's victory."

Loiret hosted three transit camps at Beaune-la-Rolande, Jargeau, and Pithiviers. Built in 1939 to hold future German prisoners of war, Beaune-la-Rolande instead detained French prisoners before their transfer to Germany, then, from May 14, 1941, following the Green ticket roundup, housed foreign Jews arrested in France for deportation, a role shared by the other two camps.

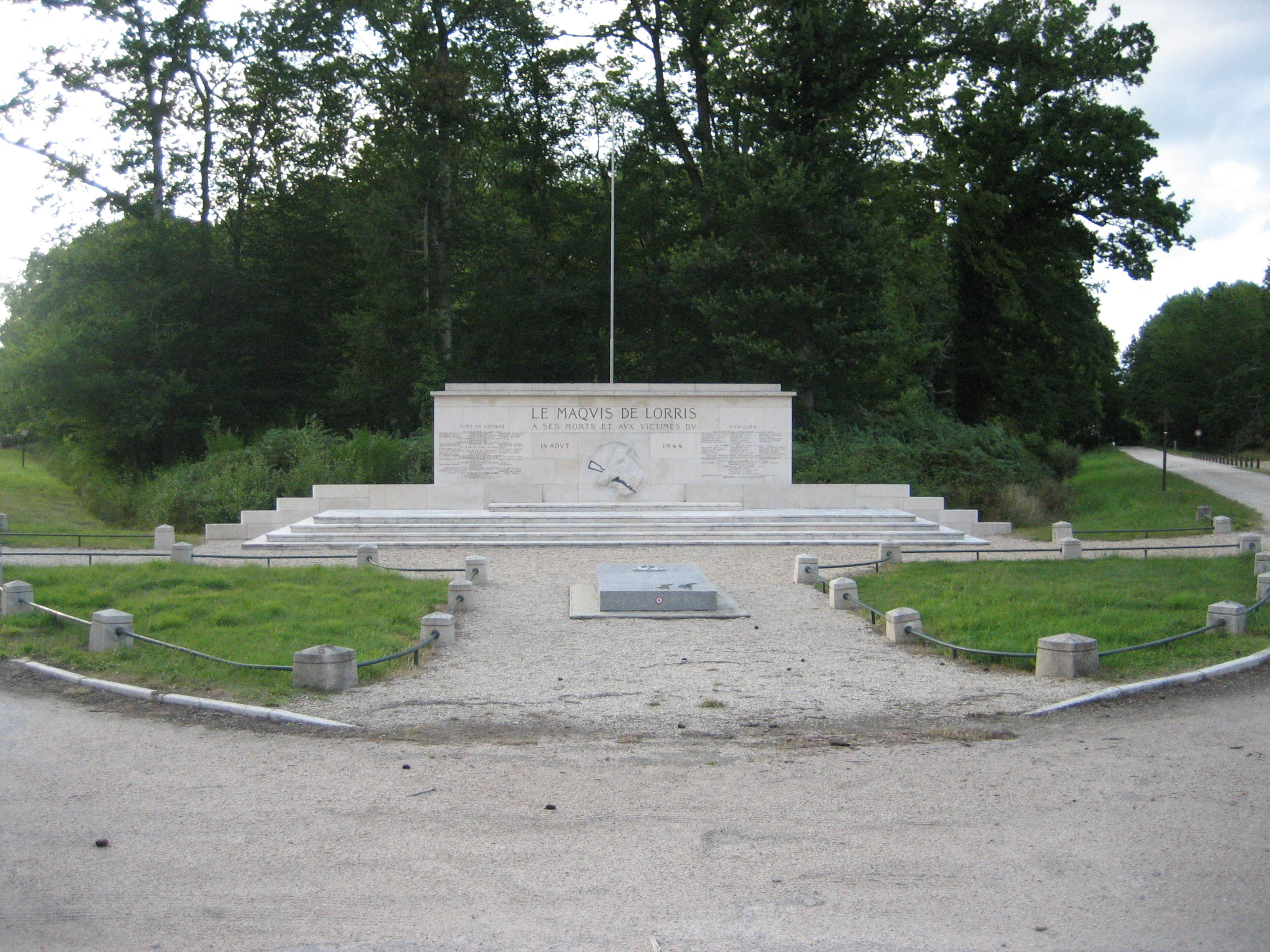
Memorial to the fallen of the Lorris Maquis.

Active resistance emerged in 1940, beginning with subversive graffiti and torn posters. The first sabotage—a telephone line cut—occurred on the night of August 18–19. Clandestine efforts soon organized into two major movements:

- The Front National, inspired by the French Communist Party, became highly active in 1941. The Chanzy group was decimated in 1943, but the movement grew under Louis Péron, a former communist detainee who escaped the Voves internment camp, leading the Loiret branch by 1944.
- Libération-Nord in Orléans, rooted in syndicalist and socialist ideals, suffered heavy losses in 1943 but reformed in February 1944 under Claude Lemaitre, an industrialist from Châteauneuf-sur-Loire.

The Vengeance network, led by Claude Lerude, conducted vital intelligence work before its destruction in January 1944.

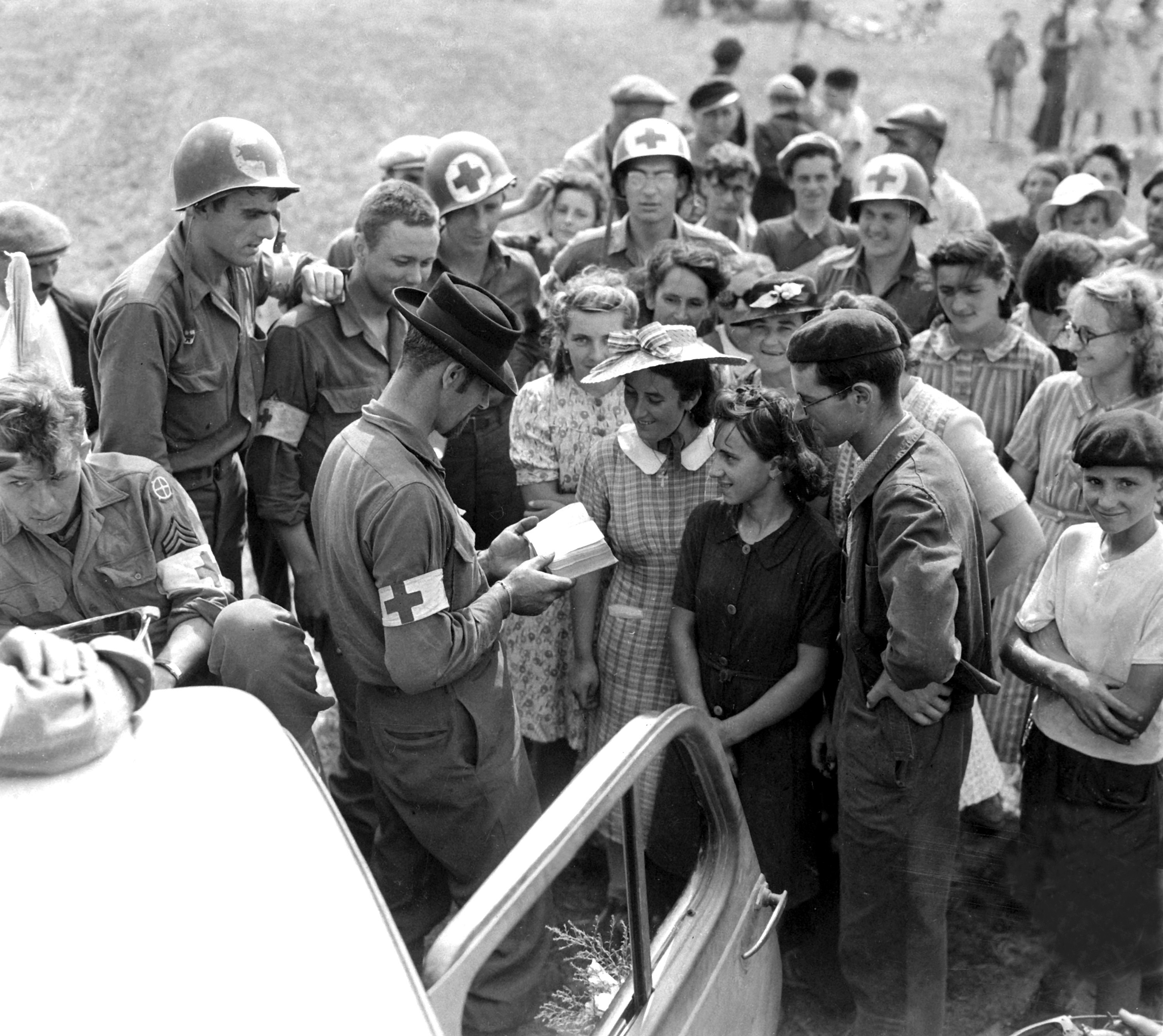
U.S. troops in Orléans, August 19, 1944.

Numerous maquis groups emerged in Sologne and the Orléans Forest, with the Lorris Maquis, led by Colonel Marc O'Neill, being the most prominent.

Anglo-American bombs first struck Orléans on May 21, 1943, but major raids intensified in May and June 1944. The Allied breakthrough at Avranches on the Normandy front accelerated events. On August 15, American forces entered Loiret, reaching Épieds-en-Beauce and Tournoisis, then advancing to Saint-Péravy-la-Colombe. They joined the FFI at Coinces. On August 16, Allied troops liberated Saran and, by evening, the north bank of Orléans. The south bank, where German forces retreated after destroying the George V Bridge, was freed days later by the FFI.

Fighting continued south of the Loire, concluding at Beaugency. Surrounded by the FFI, German General Botho Henning Elster, commanding some 20,000 troops, opted to surrender on September 10 at Issoudun to U.S. General Robert Macon rather than fight a hopeless battle. Loiret was liberated, but full victory celebrations awaited Germany's surrender on May 7–8, 1945. These took place on May 8, coinciding with the feast of Joan of Arc.

=== 1945–1960: Reconstruction ===
At the end of World War II, five Loiret cities—Orléans, Gien, Sully-sur-Loire, Châteauneuf-sur-Loire, and Saint-Denis-de-l'Hôtel—suffered significant damage. Across the department, 28,095 homes were affected (6,637 completely destroyed, 21,458 partially damaged), alongside 931 non-agricultural commercial buildings, 859 public structures, and 1,416 agricultural buildings.

The rebuilding of Gien stands out as exemplary. Despite political shifts and successive waves of destruction, the city was reconstructed seamlessly "as it was," honoring residents' wishes. The design blended ashlar stone with black-and-red brick mosaics. Similarly, new homes in Sully-sur-Loire achieved a striking uniformity, elegantly rebuilt with facades featuring cornices of brick.

For Orléans, reconstruction plans were drafted as early as 1941, but work stalled. Raoul Dautry, Minister of Reconstruction and Urban Planning, envisioned Orléans as a model for experimentation. Two visions clashed: traditionalists favored preserving the city's historical layout, while avant-gardists sought to use the cleared spaces to design a forward-looking urban landscape. Mayor Dr. Pierre Chevallier sought a compromise, incorporating residents' input. However, the process dragged on. While the city center was rebuilt along its original lines, broader redevelopment—such as modernizing the Gare district or reshaping the metropolitan area—faltered. The creation of the La Source neighborhood in the south, beginning in the 1960s, further delayed the vision of a "grand Orléans."

Shortly after the NATO treaty was signed in April 1949, Orléans was selected to host the Headquarters of the U.S. Forces Communications Zone in Europe. This logistical hub managed the transport and maintenance of personnel, supplies, and equipment. The "American colony" in Orléans numbered between 12,000 and 13,000 individuals, providing jobs for over 2,400 French civilians. Following France's withdrawal from NATO's integrated military structure in February 1966, U.S. troops left Loiret by March 1967. The sudden departure plunged Orléans into an unemployment crisis, earning it a designation as an underemployment zone.

=== 1960–1975 ===
Loiret reaped the benefits of the economic prosperity of the Trente Glorieuses and France's broader industrialization push. On May 30, 1960, a departmental industrialization plan was unveiled. Developed with input from the CCI (Chambre de commerce et d'industrie du Loiret), it aimed to create tens of thousands of jobs over the next five years, deeming it feasible to designate 300 hectares for industrial use, a quarter of which would be in the Orléans metropolitan area. In 1957, the Loiret Mixed Economy Equipment Company (SEMPEL) was established under the impetus of the Departmental Council of Loiret. In June 1960, the John Deere factory announced its establishment in Saran, marking the start of a wave of industrial investments.

In 1959, the City of Orléans and the Loiret Department acquired the 407-hectare La Source estate, envisioning a new district and the revival of the University of Orléans. In 1962, Prefect Pierre Dupuch outlined a plan to build 1,000 housing units annually for eight years. Renowned architect Louis Arretche, who rebuilt Saint-Malo, was tasked by the Ministry to design the Priority Urbanization Zone (ZUP) for La Source. The decentralization of the Postal Check Centers (CCP, Centre de chèques postaux) generated nearly 4,000 jobs. In 1963, the BRGM settled on a 30-hectare site, followed by other public and private entities, including the INSEE, the EDF billing center, tax services, Renault, Orlane perfumes, Substantia laboratories, the Loire-Bretagne Basin Agency, and Sandvik France.

Despite a 44% drop in the agricultural workforce, Loiret's population grew significantly, rising from 360,523 in 1954 to 430,629 in 1968 (a 19% increase). This economic surge drew over 30,000 foreign workers to the department by 1972. Workshops and construction sites proliferated, reflecting an era of growth and near-full employment.

In 1964, the Prefect confirmed that the Regional Hospital would be built in La Source. Robert Boulin laid its cornerstone. With a capacity of 650 beds, it consolidated most medico-surgical services and welcomed its first patients in October 1975.

Supermarkets sprang up on city outskirts, and household comforts spread, notably through Thermor, employing over 1,000 workers. Improved individual and public transportation enabled workers to settle in rural communes, blurring the once-sharp divide between urban and rural life. Between 1968 and 1975, Loiret's population climbed from 430,629 to 490,189 (a 14% rise), while Orléans grew from 95,828 to 106,246 (an 11% increase).

In 1960, plans for a scientific university center at La Source, potentially evolving into a Faculty of Sciences, were approved, with SEMPEL overseeing its development. Beyond academic facilities, the project included student housing, sports amenities, and residential zones. The first students enrolled in October 1961. By the 1964 academic year, enrollment reached 750 in Sciences and 400 in Letters. The Faculty of Law and Economic Sciences gained permanent buildings in 1973, inaugurated by Jean-Pierre Soisson, while the current Faculty of Letters, opened in 1988 by Michel Rocard, took another 15 years to complete.

The 1968 closure of secondary railway lines serving Malesherbes, Montargis, Étampes, and Pithiviers sparked widespread protests. These closures overburdened the RN 60 with road traffic.

On the road front, the General Council's records note that in May 1951, it had called for "the study and rapid construction of an 'autostrade' between Paris and Orléans." Over two decades later, the first Paris-Orléans segment of the A10 Aquitaine was inaugurated. Granted to Cofiroute by a May 12, 1970 decree for 35 years, it opened in phases: March 1973, Ponthévrard to Allainville; October 1973, Allainville to Orléans North; December 1973, Orléans North to Orléans West; and July 1974, Orléans to Tours. Concurrently, in 1973, 532 km of national roads were reclassified as departmental roads, expanding Loiret's road network to 3,100 km.

=== 1975–2000 ===
At the dawn of the 1970s, the Israeli–Arab conflict, particularly the Yom Kippur War in 1973, triggered the first oil shock. This led to a surge in bankruptcies and worsening inflation, casting the shadow of unemployment over the economy. Austerity became a common term. While the Loiret region was better positioned than others to weather this storm, it still felt the crisis's delayed impact. By October 1974, unmet job demands reached 3,800, including 1,500 unfilled job offers.

The economic crisis gradually affected all businesses, resulting in significant workforce reductions, closures, restructurings, and conversions. Unemployment soared, accompanied by early retirements, layoffs, and recovery plans. Local leaders grew anxious, questioning when the "light at the end of the tunnel" would appear. The entire economic fabric deteriorated, sparking severe social challenges. The number of unemployed surpassed 10,000, eventually impacting the tertiary sector as well. The crisis's effects compounded with staff cuts driven by technological advancements, as companies automated production and packaging lines to reduce labor costs. A report from late November 1979 highlighted a sharp rise in job seekers: 19% in the Loiret over one year and nearly 30% in the Giennois region, particularly around Briare.

The 1982 decentralization laws shifted certain powers to local authorities, enabling them to bolster the regional economy. To promote the Loiret and attract new businesses, the Loiret General Council established two entities on June 24, 1983: the Société mutuelle de financement des entreprises du Loiret (SOFINEL) and the Agence de Développement économique du Loiret (ADEL). These initiatives, combined with efforts from other economic stakeholders, quickly bore fruit. The Scott Paper Company built a 3-hectare factory-warehouse in Saint-Cyr-en-Val, representing a 31-million-franc investment. Other American firms like Cargill and McKey, followed by Japanese companies such as Hitachi, Komori, and Shiseido, arrived. However, some, including Scott Paper (later Kimberly-Clark), failed to fully meet job creation and development promises. Consequently, by early 2000s, the Loiret's unemployment rate dropped to a low 6.3% in the first quarter of 2000, compared to a national rate of 9.5%.

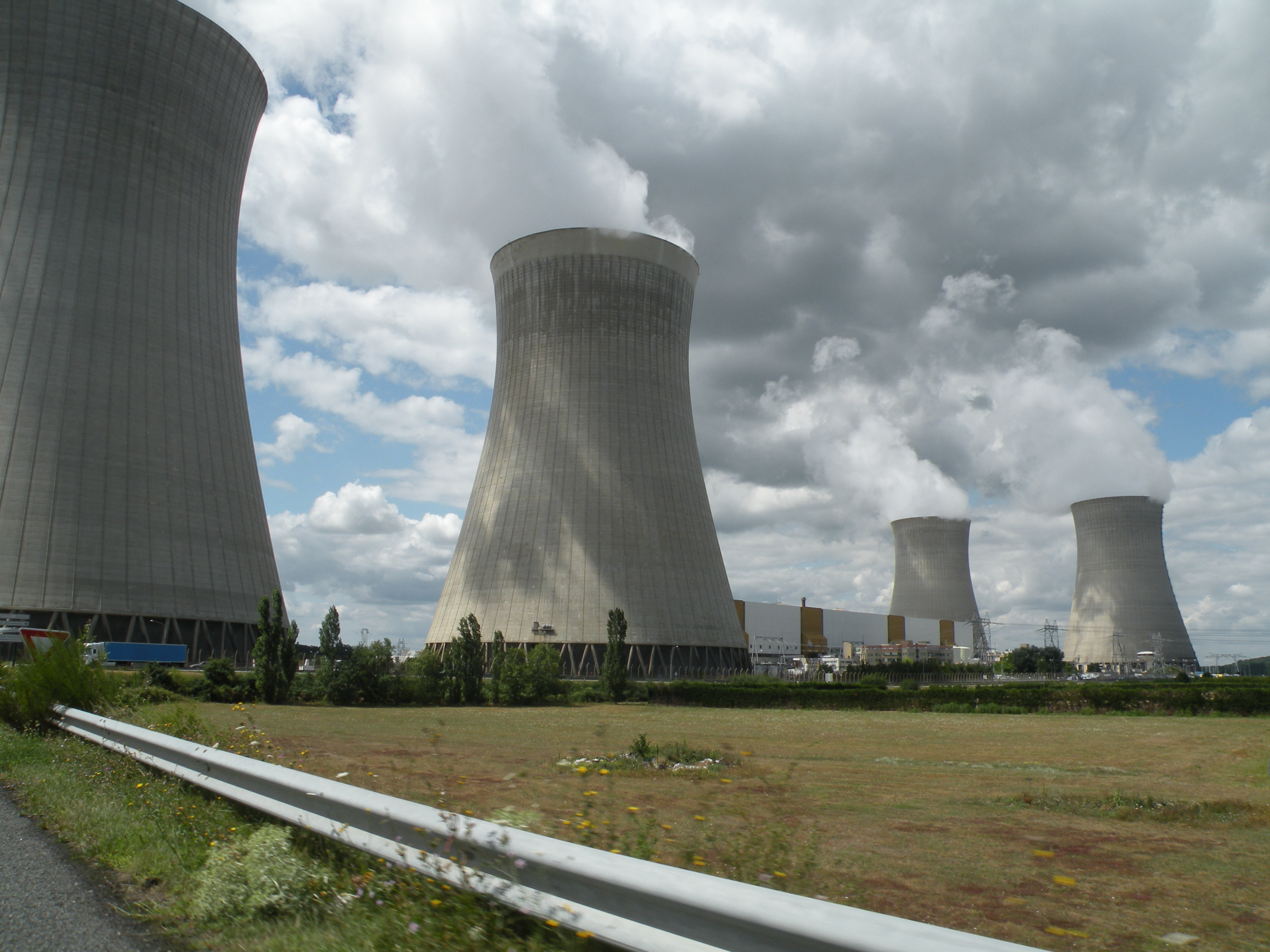
The Dampierre Nuclear Power Plant was commissioned in 1980.

The oil shock in October 1973, which saw oil prices double twice, starkly exposed Western nations' energy dependence and vulnerability amid robust economic growth. In response, the French government launched an ambitious nuclear power program. Dampierre-en-Burly, located along the Loire River in a rural area, was an ideal site for a nuclear power plant. It was included in the CP1 contract-program launched in 1974, which involved building 18 reactors of 900 MWe across four sites: four at Dampierre, four at Blayais (Gironde), six at Gravelines (Nord), and four at Tricastin (Drôme). Dampierre's reactors were connected to the grid on March 23, 1980, December 10, 1980, January 30, 1981, and August 18, 1981, respectively.

New highways were constructed, enhancing the Loiret's existing road network and making it exceptionally well-connected. The A71 highway, linking Orléans to Clermont-Ferrand, was concessioned to Cofiroute in 1977 and saw its first Loiret section (Orléans to Salbris) open on October 24, 1986. Another highway, the A77, traversing eastern Loiret north to south, eased congestion on the A6 and improved access to the Nièvre and Loiret regions. Its 64-kilometer Dordives-to-Briare stretch opened on November 17, 1999. For air transport, the Loiret hosted two airfields: the Bricy Air Base and the Saint-Denis-de-l'Hôtel aerodrome. Proximity to Orly Airport made a commercial airport unfeasible, but local industries demanded facilities for business aviation. In 1988, the General Council funded a 1,000-meter paved runway at Saint-Denis-de-l'Hôtel, along with a terminal featuring a control tower compliant with Instrument Flight Rules (IFR). Between 1992 and 1993, a commercial zone added 3,600 m² of hangars, 800 m² of offices, and a parking lot.

A hybrid of air and rail, the Aérotrain, designed by Jean Bertin and propelled on an air cushion, set a world land speed record of 430 km/h in the Loiret on March 5, 1974. A decade earlier, it had piqued the interest of Prime Minister Georges Pompidou. However, the oil crisis doomed this energy-intensive project, and in July 1974, the new government scrapped plans for a Cergy-Pontoise to La Défense line. The experimental Orléans-Artenay track remains today.

In 1979, the departmental assembly abandoned plans to restore SNCF passenger service between Orléans and Montargis, citing high costs and uncertain benefits. During the TGV Sud-Est's inauguration on September 22, 1981, President François Mitterrand announced a TGV line to the Atlantic. This bypassed Orléans, connecting Paris to Tours in one hour, with effects felt only in the 2000s. On the Paris-Bordeaux-Spain axis, Orléans and Blois lost direct links to Poitiers, Angoulême, and Bordeaux, severing connections to Spain, the Pyrenees foothills, the Garonne Valley, and the Toulouse region. Combined with the highway network, the TGV drew many cities closer to Paris, while Orléans drifted further from Europe's shifting economic and demographic core.

== 21st century ==
=== Bringing the Loire closer together ===
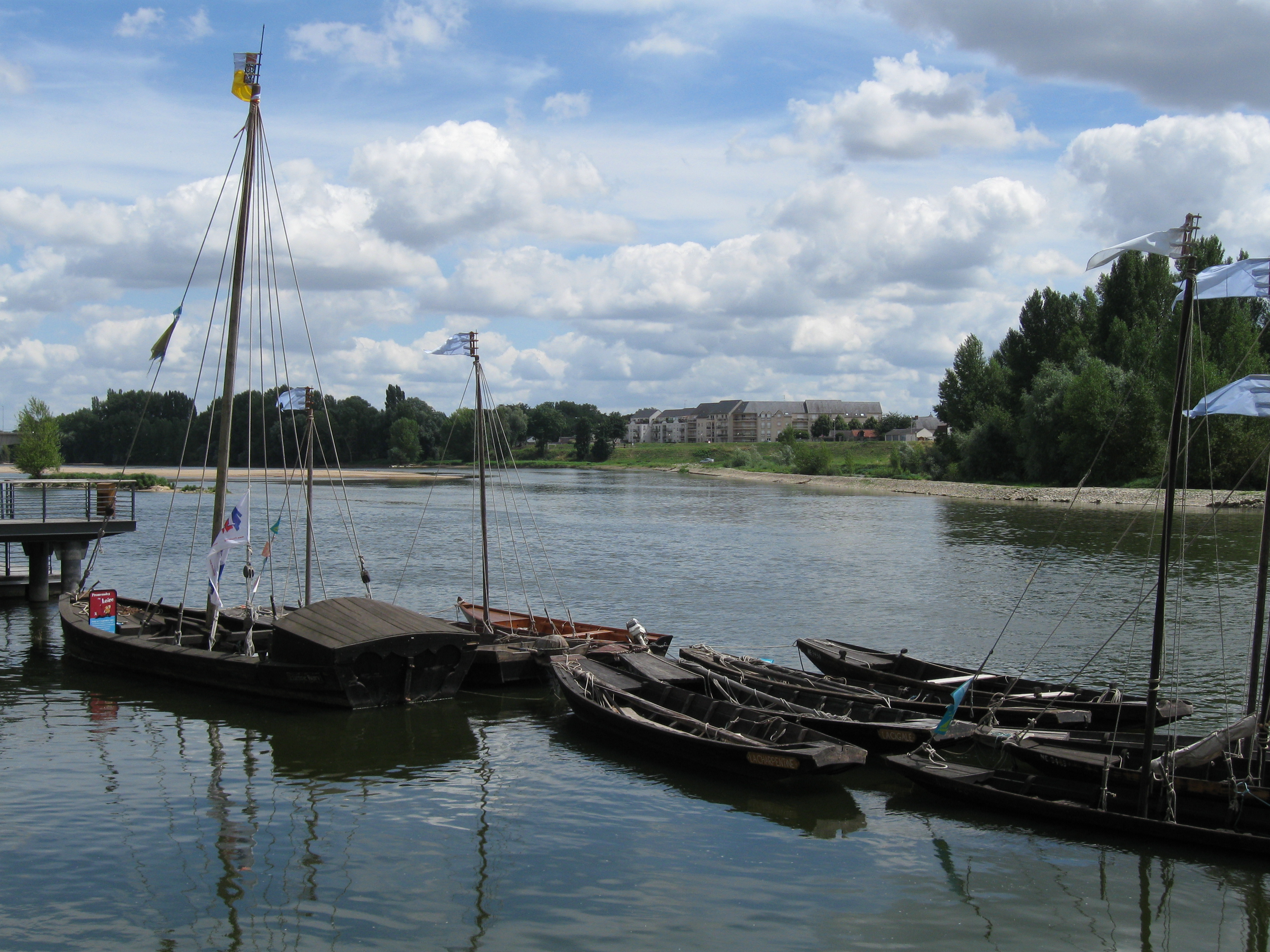
Futreaux (flat-bottomed Loire boats) and skiffs at Orléans. The Loire emerges as a new identity for the Loiret.

Although the Loire River has long been a cherished part of the region's heritage, it was not until the early 2000s that the Loiret department and its riverside communities began to embrace and promote the river as a core element of their identity. A pivotal moment came on November 30, 2000, when the Val de Loire, stretching from Sully-sur-Loire to Chalonnes-sur-Loire (Maine-et-Loire), was inscribed on the UNESCO World Heritage List as a living, evolving cultural landscape. This recognition, beyond its international prestige, committed France—signatory to the World Heritage Convention—to protect, preserve, and enhance this natural asset. The management plan for the Val de Loire World Heritage site was officially approved by a prefectural decree on November 15, 2012.

In 2002, the Loiret General Council launched its first major festive event, Jours de Loire (Days of the Loire), uniting all Loire riverside communes for five days of celebration. The event drew 50,000 spectators in its inaugural year and grew to 80,000 by its second edition in 2006. Renamed Caravane de Loire (Loire Caravan) in 2008, it expanded to include a traveling show and non-riverside towns like Montargis. The event peaked in 2010 with a record 350,000 attendees, featuring 230 artists, acrobats, and boatmen, alongside 25 performing troupes. However, 2010 marked its final occurrence.

In 2003, the Orléans City Council introduced its own celebration, the Festival de Loire, spotlighting the Loire's heritage, particularly its maritime traditions. Held biennially in September, it has since gained national and even European acclaim. The sixth edition in 2012 attracted over 650,000 visitors in five days, cementing its status as Europe's largest gathering dedicated to river navigation.

=== Infrastructure ===
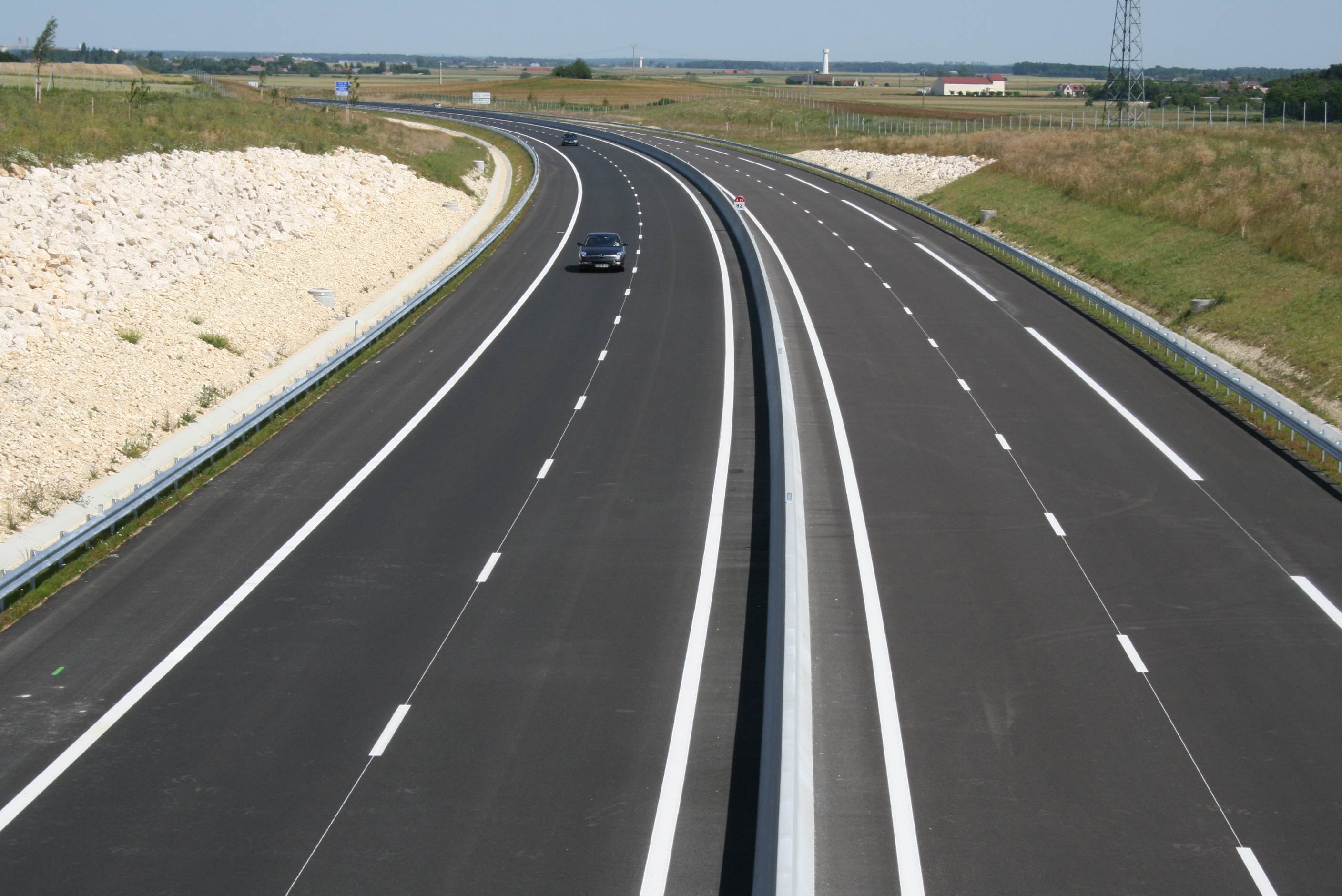
The A19 highway, a major project of the 2000s.

To address the growing traffic at the Paris-Roissy airport hub, the idea of a third international airport in the Greater Paris Basin was studied in 1995. The Douffiagues mission report, released in June 1995, recommended Beauvilliers, south of Chartres, as the site for this potential airport, projected for completion between 2010 and 2015. This presented a significant development opportunity for the Centre region and the Loiret. However, indecision over expanding runways at Roissy delayed the project. A public debate unfolded from 2000 to 2001, with Beauvilliers competing against seven other sites. On November 15, 2001, Prime Minister Lionel Jospin selected Chaulnes from the eight finalists, but the subsequent change in government led to the project's abandonment.

The A19 highway, spanning 101 kilometers and crossing the Loiret from east to west, also faced prolonged delays. Approved in principle during the November 1988 Interministerial Committee for Territorial Planning (CIAT) as a concessioned link between Courtenay and Orléans, it underwent multiple route studies and a DUP that was approved and extended. Construction finally began with initial earthworks in 2006, and the highway was inaugurated in June 2009 after 50 months of work. Early operational years revealed lower-than-expected traffic, attributed to the economic crisis and one of France's highest toll rates.

In 2009, the law implementing the Grenelle Environment Forum included the Paris–Orléans–Clermont-Ferrand–Lyon high-speed line (LGV POCL) in a plan for 2,500 kilometers of new lines, supplementing 2,000 kilometers targeted for completion by 2020. This project aimed to integrate Orléans into the high-speed rail network and reduce travel time from Paris to Clermont-Ferrand to under two hours, while improving service to Bourges and other central cities. On June 17, 2012, the RFF board, meeting in general assembly, refrained from selecting one of four proposed routes but commissioned a further study to evaluate a western route (near Orléans) or a median route (passing through Gien in the Loiret, with a branch to Orléans).

=== Economy ===
The Loiret's economic appeal stood out in the early 2000s. In 2001, its unemployment rate was a remarkable 5.1% (versus 8.2% nationally), rising slightly to 6.0% in the first quarter of 2008. However, it deteriorated rapidly thereafter, outpacing many other departments, reaching 10.2% by the second quarter of 2013, aligning with the national average of 10.8%. Like the broader Centre-Val de Loire region, the Loiret suffered significant industrial job losses during the economic crisis, particularly in chemicals and pharmaceuticals, rubber and plastics manufacturing, metallurgy, electrical equipment and machinery production, and transport equipment manufacturing. The construction sector, already declining regionally since late 2008, also weakened, contrasting with earlier gains.

Nevertheless, the Loiret boasts strengths, notably a dense network of industrial firms and SMEs across diverse, high-value sectors, with significant emphasis on research, innovation, and technology transfer, particularly in sustainable production and environmental solutions. Its competitiveness clusters highlight and reinforce these assets. Established by the Interministerial Committee for Territorial Planning and Competitiveness (CIACT) on December 13, 2002, the competitiveness cluster policy fosters "groupings within a territory of businesses, higher education institutions, and public or private research organizations working synergistically on innovative economic development projects." By 2010, France had 71 such clusters. The Loiret hosts four labeled clusters: Cosmetic Valley, a global leader in perfumery and cosmetics; Sciences et Systèmes de l'Énergie Électrique (S2E2); Élastopole, focusing on materials, innovative products and processes, environment and energy, and economic and social issues; and DREAM, based in Orléans, dedicated to water resource sustainability, involving firms like Geo-hyd, LVMH, Vergnet, Iris Instruments, ANTEA, and DSA.

Major projects also emerged as responses to the crisis. In the Orléans area during the 2000s, these included:

- The Line A tramway, running north-south, opened on November 20, 2000, followed by the Line B tramway, running east-west, launched on June 29, 2012;
- Construction of the new Regional Hospital Center (CHR) south of Orléans, with its groundbreaking in November 2009, the largest hospital project in France, and Oréliance, the largest private healthcare hub under the Hospital 2012 plan, approved in 2006 and opening its emergency department in September 2013.

== See also ==
- National Volunteers of Loiret During the Revolution
- History of Orléans
- History of the Departmental Council of Loiret

== Bibliography ==
- Guiot, Thibaud; Morin, Jean-Michel (2009). Aux origines du Loiret: de la Préhistoire à l'A19 [The Origins of Loiret: From Prehistory to the A19]. Orléans: Conseil général du Loiret. p. 59. ISBN 978-2-9503428-4-3.
- Debal, Jacques (1974). Les Gaulois en Orléanais: des invasions celtiques à l'occupation romaine [The Gauls in the Orléans region: from Celtic invasions to Roman occupation] (in French). Orléans: Société archéologique et historique de l'Orléanais. p. 126.
- Collectif (September 2, 1998). Loiret : un département à l'élégance naturelle [Loiret: A Department of Natural Elegance]. Paris: Christine Bonneton. p. 319. ISBN 978-2-86253-234-9.
- Jarry, L. (1884). Les débuts de l'imprimerie à Orléans [The Beginnings of Printing in Orléans]. Orléans: H. Herluison.
- Desgraves, Louis (1966). Éloi Gibier, imprimeur à Orléans (1536–1588) [Éloi Gibier, Printer in Orléans (1536–1588)]. Geneva: Librairie Droz. p. 116. ISBN 978-2-600-03007-6.
- Pinon, Pierre (July 11, 1986). Un canal... des canaux [One Canal... Many Canals] (in French). Paris: Editions A et J Picard. p. 415. ISBN 2-7084-0298-6.
- Vignon, E. J. M. (1862). Études historiques sur l'administration des voies publiques en France avant 1790 [Historical Studies on the Administration of Public Roads in France Before 1790] (in French). Paris: Dunod.
- Pinsseau, Hubert (1963). Histoire de la construction de l'administration et de l'exploitation du canal d'Orléans de 1676 à 1954 [History of the Construction, Administration, and Operation of the Orléans Canal from 1676 to 1954] (in French). Orléans: Clavrettil Masselot.
- Vannier, Serge; Templier, Monique (March 2001). Orléans au fil de son histoire [Orléans Through Its History] (in French). Chambray: Cld. p. 127. ISBN 2-85443-384-X.
- Société des amis des musées d'Orléans (1993). Grand livre du pont Royal [Great Book of the Royal Bridge] (in French). Orléans: Société des amis des musées d'Orléans. p. 221. ISBN 2-9503926-3-6.
- Ojaldo, David (1977). Les ponts d'Orléans [The Bridges of Orléans] (in French). Orléans: Musées d'Orléans.
- Peronnet, Jean-Rodolphe (1987) [1788]. Construire des ponts au XVIIIe siècle [Building Bridges in the 18th Century] (in French). Paris: Presses de l'école nationale des Ponts et Chaussées. p. 340. ISBN 978-2-85978-103-3.
- Cuissard, Charles (1897). Étude sur le commerce et l'industrie à Orléans [Study on Commerce and Industry in Orléans] (in French). Orléans: H. Herluison. p. 307.
- Pignard-Péguet, Maurice (1998). Dictionnaire historique et biographique illustré du Loiret [Illustrated Historical and Biographical Dictionary of Loiret] (in French). Péronnas: Éditions de la Tour Gile. p. 752. ISBN 2-87802-345-5.
- Bloch, Camille (1906). Département du Loiret. Cahiers de doléances du bailliage d'Orléans pour les États généraux de 1789 [Loiret Department: Grievance Books of the Orléans Bailliage for the Estates-General of 1789] (in French). Orléans: Imprimerie orléanaise. p. 800.
- Robert, E. (1926). Histoire du Loiret [History of Loiret] (in French). Orléans: G. Luzeray. p. 64.
- Debal, Jacques (1982). Histoire d'Orléans et de son terroir : tome II (XVIIe, XVIIIe-XIXe) [History of Orléans and Its Region: Volume II (17th, 18th-19th Centuries)] (in French). Le Coteau: Editions Horvath. p. 365. ISBN 2-7171-0247-7.
- Debal, Jacques (1983). Histoire d'Orléans et de son terroir : tome III (de 1870 à nos jours) [History of Orléans and Its Region: Volume III (From 1870 to the Present)] (in French). Le Coteau: Editions Horvath. p. 343. ISBN 2-7171-0288-4.
- Flonneau, Jean-Marie (1987). Deux siècles d'industrie dans le Loiret : 1750-1950 [Two Centuries of Industry in Loiret: 1750-1950] (in French). Saint-Jean-de-Braye: Les Presses du Val de Loire. p. 120. ISBN 2-909390-02-0.
- Voldman, Danièle (1997). La reconstruction des villes françaises de 1940 à 1954 : histoire d'une politique [The Reconstruction of French Cities from 1940 to 1954: History of a Policy] (in French). Paris: Éditions L'Harmattan. p. 487. ISBN 2-7384-5194-2.
- Blanquet, Henri (1994). 1940-1990 Cinquante ans de Loiret : la passion d'un Président [1940-1990 Fifty Years of Loiret: A President's Passion] (in French). Orléans: Conseil Général du Loiret. p. 357.
- Rouche, Michel (1996). Clovis (in French). Paris: Presses de l'Université de Paris-Sorbonne. ISBN 2-2135-9632-8.
- Fournier, Marie (2008). Quelle place pour les riverains dans la gestion des inondations de la Loire ? Les leçons du passé – Partie 1 [What Place for Riverside Residents in Managing Loire Floods? Lessons from the Past – Part 1] (in French). Orléans: Établissement public Loire.
