= Philippe Chanlot =

French footballer (born 1967)

Personal information
- Full name: Philippe Chanlot
- Date of birth: 8 October 1967 (age 59)
- Place of birth: Orléans, France
- Height: 1.82 m (6 ft 0 in)
- Position: Striker

Senior career*
Years	Team	Apps	(Gls)
1984–1985	Lille B	4	(0)
1985–1986	Dunkerque	5	(0)
1986–1988	Marseille B	52	(13)
1988–1990	Annecy	63	(14)
1990–1994	Metz	100	(10)
1990–1991	→ Louhans (loan)	31	(4)
1994–1995	Perpignan	36	(13)
1995–1996	Toulouse	20	(4)
1996–1997	Perpignan	34	(10)
1997–1998	Neuchâtel Xamax	25	(6)
1998–2000	Chamois Niortais	63	(8)
2000–2001	Wasquehal	8	(1)
2001–2002	Zhejiang Greentown	?	(?)
2002–2004	Rouen	36	(10)
- * Club domestic league appearances and goals

Philippe Chanlot (born 8 October 1967) is a French former professional footballer. He played as a striker.
