= Félix Cazot =

French pianist, composer and music teacher

Félix Cazot (6 April 1790 – 24 December 1857) was a French pianist, composer and music teacher.

Born in Orléans, Cazot studied at the Conservatoire de Paris where he obtained a First prize in 1811. In 1812, he won the Prix de Rome for his cantata Madame de la Vallière.

In 1814, Cazot married the singer Joséphine Armand, the niece and pupil of Anne-Aimeé Armand, with whom he went to Belgium when she was engaged at the Brussels Theatre in 1817. He taught the piano in Brussels from 1814 to 1821. Then he returned to Paris to continue teaching.

He mainly composed pieces for the piano. He wrote a Méthode moderne et facile pour le piano-forte.

Cazot died in Paris at age 67.

== Bibliography ==
- Fauquet, Joël-Marie (2003). Dictionnaire de la Musique en France au XIX (in French). Fayard. p. 1405. ISBN 2-213-59316-7.
