= Orléans =

Prefecture and commune in France

- Prefecture and commune
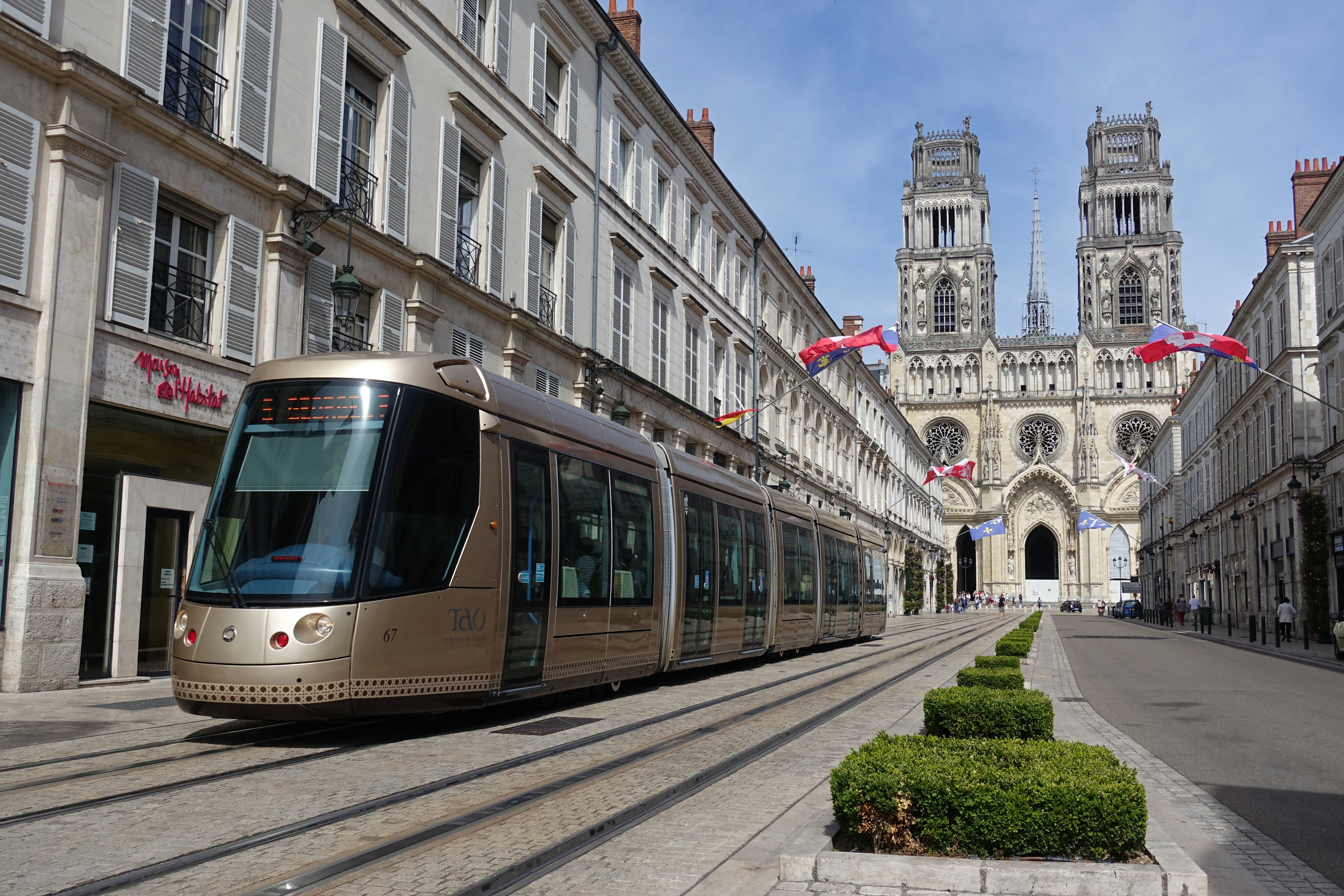
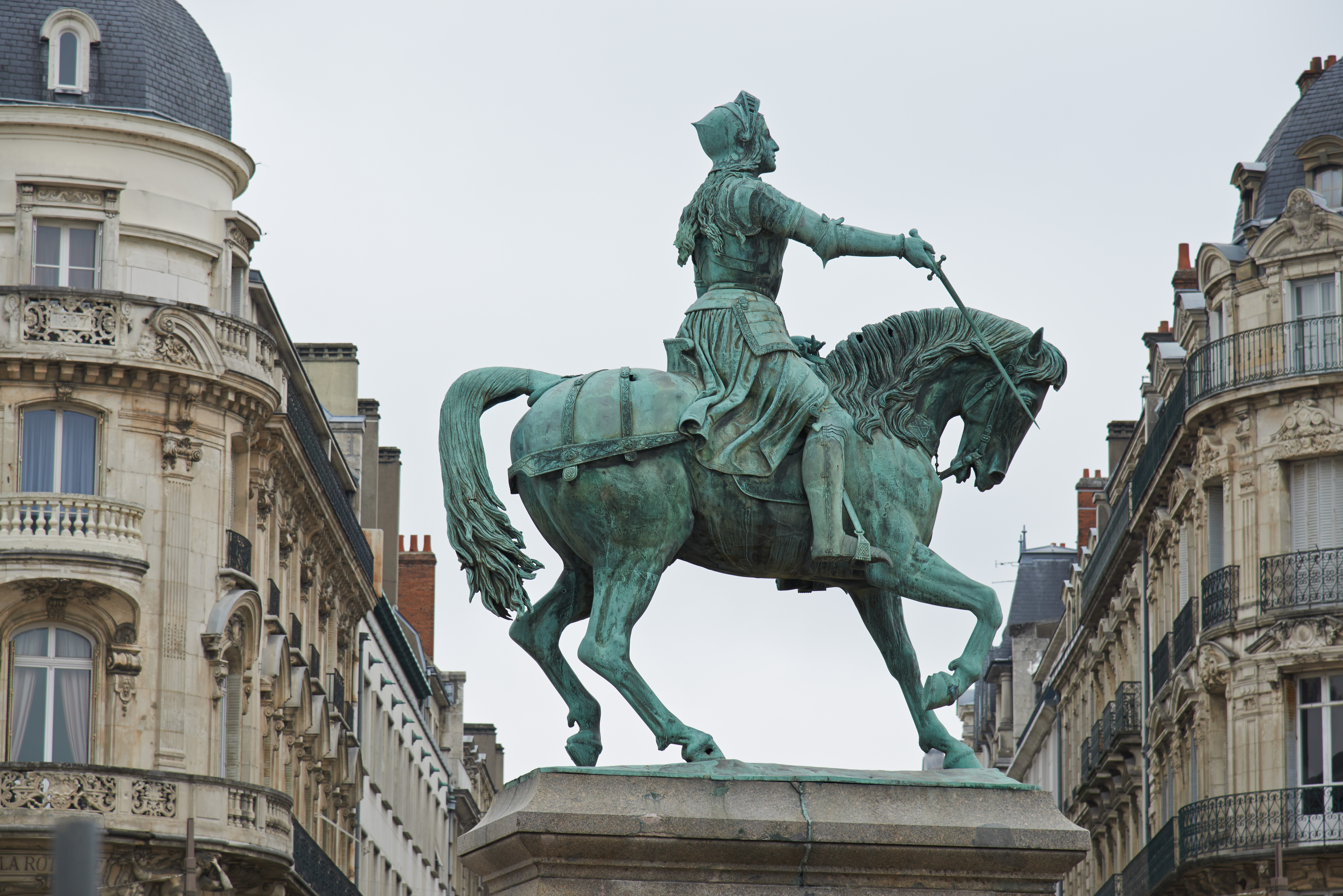
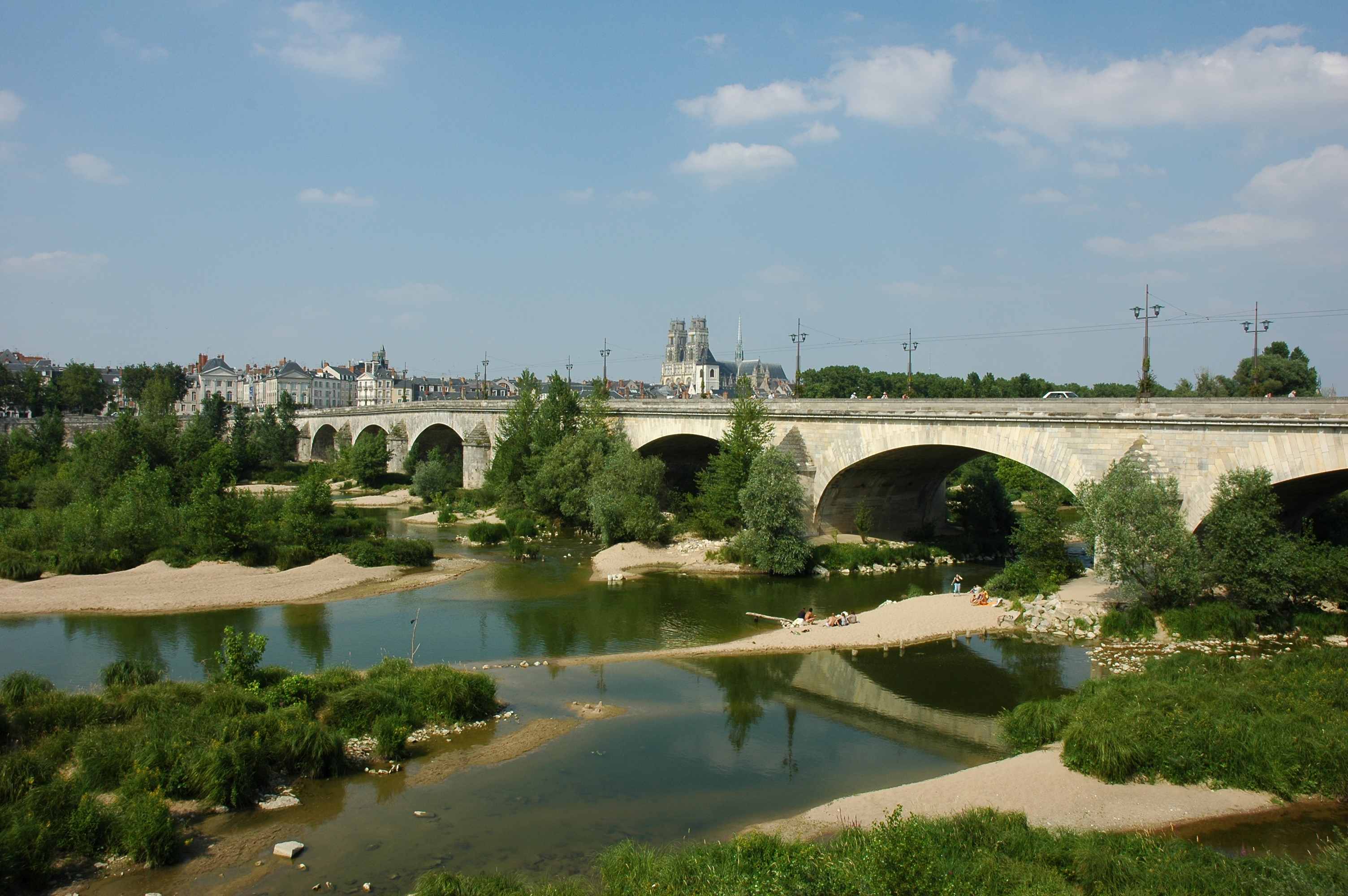
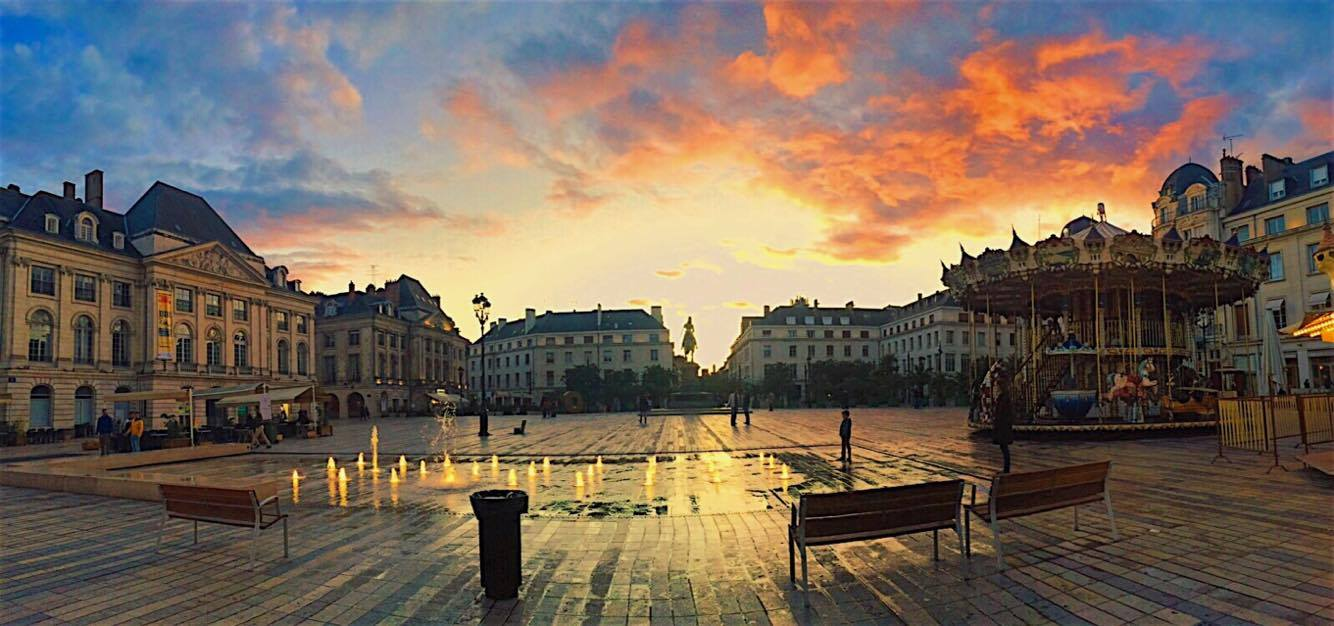
- Rue Jeanne d'Arc and the Sainte-Croix Cathedral Equestrian statue of Joan of Arc George V Bridge Place du Martroi

- Flag Coat of arms
- Motto: Hoc Vernant Lilia Corde (Latin) transl. "This heart makes lilies flourish"
- Location of Orléans
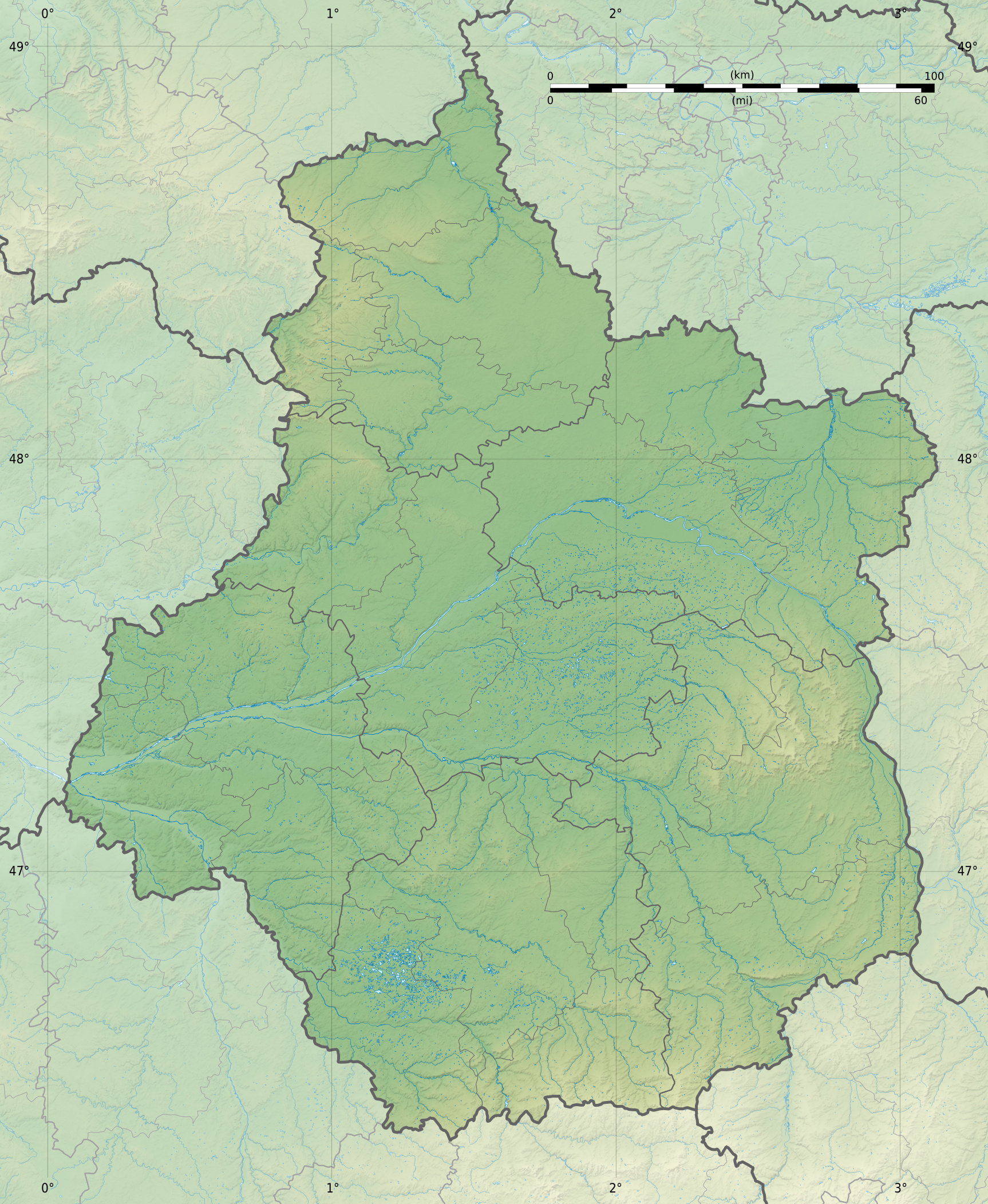
- Location within France Location within Centre-Val de Loire
- Coordinates: 47°54′09″N 1°54′32″E
- Country: France
- Region: Centre-Val de Loire
- Department: Loiret
- Arrondissement: Orléans
- Canton: Orléans-1, 2, 3 and 4 and La Ferté-Saint-Aubin
- Intercommunality: Orléans Métropole

Government
  - Mayor (2026–32): Serge Grouard (LR)
- Area^{1}: 27.48 km^{2} (10.61 sq mi)
  - Urban (2020): 289.5 km^{2} (111.8 sq mi)
  - Metro (2020): 3,422 km^{2} (1,321 sq mi)
- Elevation: 116 m (381 ft)
- Highest elevation: 124 m (407 ft)
- Lowest elevation: 90 m (300 ft)
- Population (2023): 116,357
  - Density: 4,234/km^{2} (10,970/sq mi)
  - Urban (2023): 292,837
  - Urban density: 1,012/km^{2} (2,620/sq mi)
  - Metro (2023): 463,435
  - Metro density: 135.4/km^{2} (350.8/sq mi)
- Demonym: Orléanais
- Time zone: UTC+01:00 (CET)
  - Summer (DST): UTC+02:00 (CEST)
- INSEE/Postal code: 45234 /45000
- Website: www.orleans.fr
- ^{1} French Land Register data, which excludes lakes, ponds, glaciers > 1 km^{2} (0.386 sq mi or 247 acres) and river estuaries.

Orléans (US: /ˌɔːrleɪˈɒ̃, ˌɔːrliˈɑːn, ɔːrˈleɪənz/; French: [ɔʁleɑ̃]) is a city in north-central France, about 120 kilometres (74 miles) southwest of Paris. It is the prefecture of the department of Loiret, within the region of Centre-Val de Loire.

Orléans is located on the river Loire nestled in the heart of the Loire Valley, a region classified as a World Heritage Site where the river curves west to head to the Atlantic Ocean after its northward journey from the Massif Central. In 2023, the city had 116,357 inhabitants within its municipal boundaries. Orléans is the center of Orléans Métropole that has a population of 297,350 (2023). The larger metropolitan area has a population of 454,208, the 20th largest in France.

The city owes its development from antiquity to the commercial exchanges resulting from the river. An important river trade port, it was the headquarters of the community of merchants frequenting the Loire. It was the capital of the Kingdom of France during the Merovingian period and played an important role in the Hundred Years' War, particularly known for the role of Joan of Arc during the siege of Orléans. Every first week of May since 1432, the city pays homage to the "Maid of Orléans" during the Johannic Holidays which has been listed in the inventory of intangible cultural heritage in France. One of Europe's oldest universities was created in 1306 by Pope Clement V and re-founded in 1966 as the University of Orléans, hosting more than 20,000 students in 2019.

The Île d'Orléans in Quebec, Canada, takes its name from Orléans, as do Orléans, Ontario; Orleans, Massachusetts; and the city of New Orleans, Louisiana.

== Geography ==
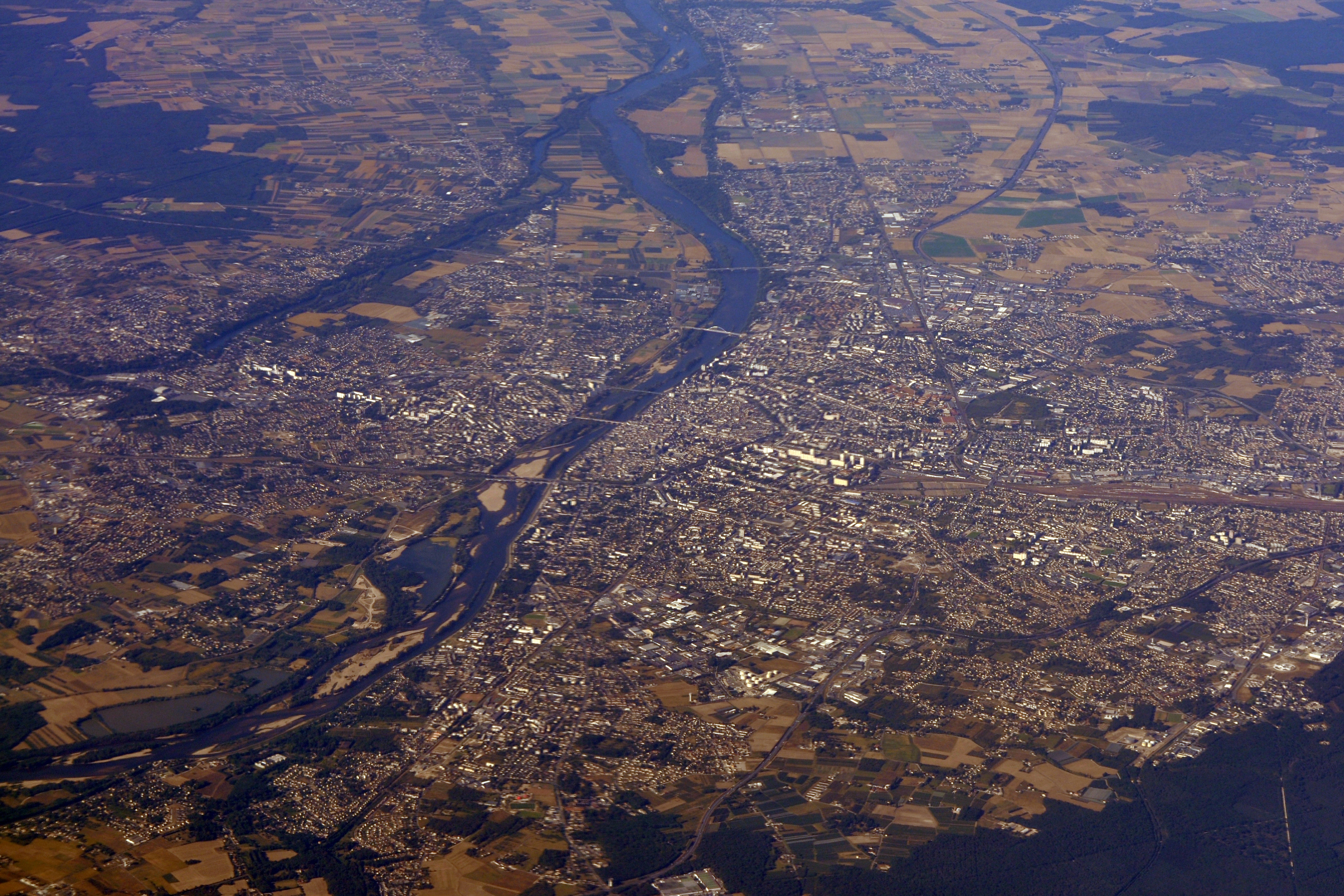
Orléans from above

Orléans is located in the northern bend of the Loire, which crosses from east to west. Orléans belongs to the vallée de la Loire sector between Sully-sur-Loire and Chalonnes-sur-Loire, which was in 2000 inscribed by UNESCO as a World Heritage Site. The capital of Orléanais, 120 kilometres southwest of Paris, is bordered to the north by the Beauce region, more specifically the Orléans Forest (French: forêt d'Orléans) and Orléans-la-Source neighbourhood, and the Sologne region to the south.

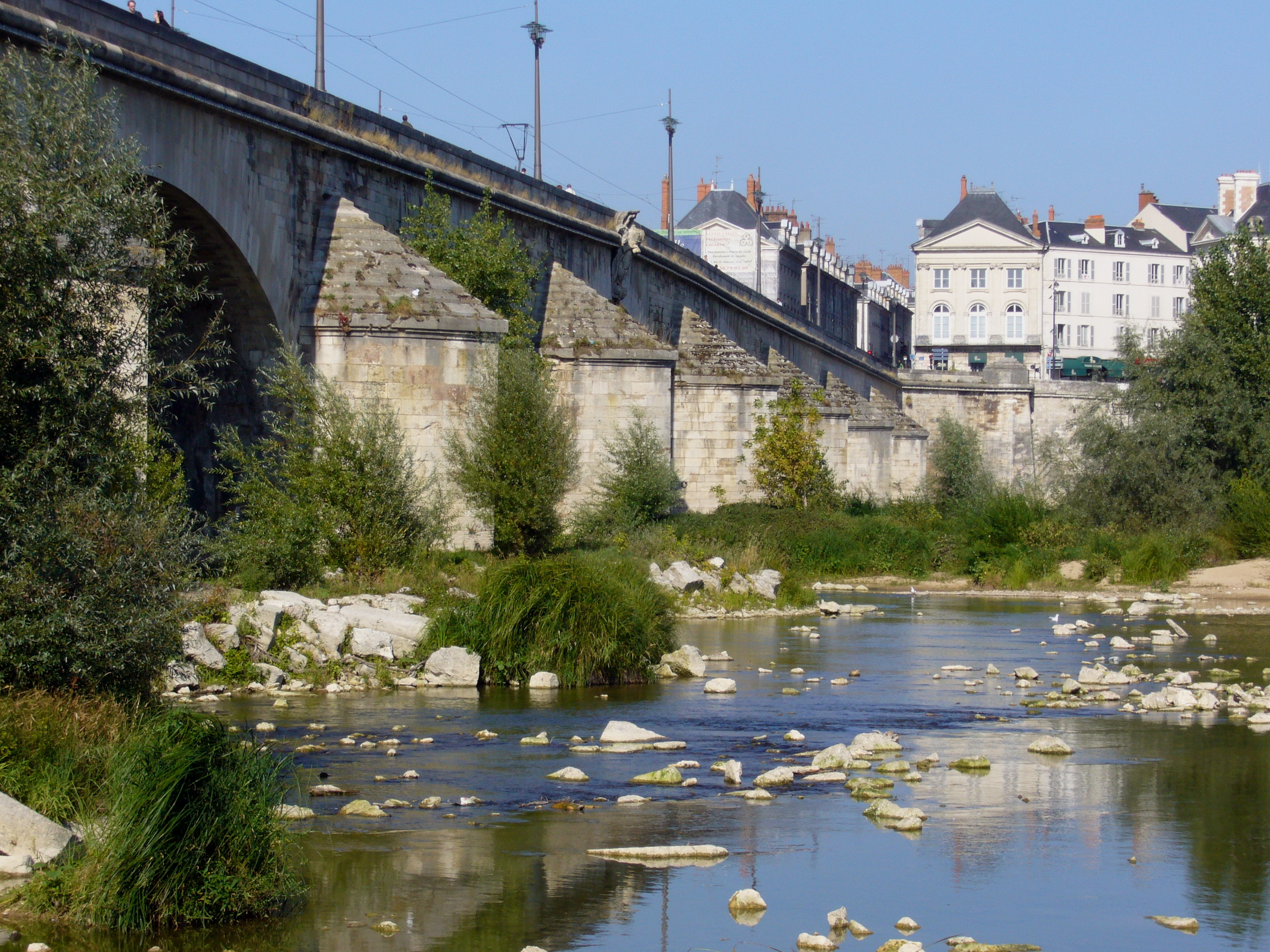
Pont George-V

Five bridges in the city cross the Loire: Pont de l'Europe, Pont du Maréchal Joffre (also called Pont Neuf), Pont George-V (also called Pont Royal, carrying the commune tramway), Pont René-Thinat and Pont de Vierzon (rail bridge).

To the north of the Loire (rive droite) is to be found a small hill (102 m (335 ft) at the pont Georges-V, 110 m (360 ft) at the Place du Martroi) which gently rises to 125 m (410 ft) at la Croix Fleury, at the limits of Fleury-les-Aubrais. Conversely, the south (on the rive gauche) has a gentle depression to about 95 m (312 ft) above sea level (at Saint-Marceau) between the Loire and the Loiret, designated a "zone inondable" (flood-risk zone).

At the end of the 1960s, the Orléans-la-Source neighbourhood was created, 12 kilometres (7 mi) to the south of the original commune and separated from it by the Val d'Orléans and the river Loiret (whose source is in the Parc Floral de la Source). This quarter's altitude varies from about 100 to 110 m (330 to 360 ft).

=== Climate ===
Orléans experiences an oceanic climate (Köppen climate classification Cfb), similar to much of central France. July and August, the warmest months, have an average temperature of 19.7 °C (67.5 °F) and a high of 25.8 °C (78.4 °F), while January, the coldest month, has an average temperature of 4.4 °C (39.9 °F) and an average low temperature of 1.7 °C (35.1 °F), although February has a lower average low than January at 1.3 °C (34.3 °F). The record high temperature is 41.3 °C (106.3 °F) recorded in July, while the record low temperature of −19.8 °C (−3.6 °F) was recorded in January.

Precipitation is evenly distributed year-round, with Orléans receiving 635.5 millimetres (25.02 in) of precipitation annually. However, some months are slightly wetter than others, with the driest month receiving 44.2 millimetres (1.74 in) of rain and the wettest receiving 63.0 millimetres (2.48 in) of precipitation on average. Precipitation days vary more, with less of them in the summer months than in the other seasons. Humidity is high year-round but decreases slightly in summer. July and August only have their humidity at 72% but December has 90% humidity on average. Orléans receives 1,822.6 hours of sunshine annually, with summer being the sunniest season and winter being the least sunny season. July, receiving 232.0 hours of sunshine on average, is the sunniest month, and December, receiving 60.9 hours of sunshine on average, has the least amount of sunshine.

Climate data for Orléans, elevation: 123 m (404 ft) (1991-2020 normals, extremes 1938-present)
Month	Jan	Feb	Mar	Apr	May	Jun	Jul	Aug	Sep	Oct	Nov	Dec	Year
Record high °C (°F)	16.6 (61.9)	22.4 (72.3)	26.5 (79.7)	29.8 (85.6)	32.7 (90.9)	40.8 (105.4)	41.3 (106.3)	39.9 (103.8)	35.0 (95.0)	30.1 (86.2)	21.8 (71.2)	18.6 (65.5)	41.3 (106.3)
Mean daily maximum °C (°F)	7.1 (44.8)	8.5 (47.3)	12.6 (54.7)	16.0 (60.8)	19.6 (67.3)	23.1 (73.6)	25.8 (78.4)	25.8 (78.4)	21.7 (71.1)	16.5 (61.7)	10.9 (51.6)	7.5 (45.5)	16.3 (61.3)
Daily mean °C (°F)	4.4 (39.9)	4.9 (40.8)	7.9 (46.2)	10.6 (51.1)	14.2 (57.6)	17.5 (63.5)	19.7 (67.5)	19.7 (67.5)	16.1 (61.0)	12.4 (54.3)	7.7 (45.9)	4.8 (40.6)	11.7 (53.1)
Mean daily minimum °C (°F)	1.7 (35.1)	1.3 (34.3)	3.3 (37.9)	5.2 (41.4)	8.8 (47.8)	11.8 (53.2)	13.6 (56.5)	13.6 (56.5)	10.5 (50.9)	8.2 (46.8)	4.5 (40.1)	2.1 (35.8)	7.0 (44.6)
Record low °C (°F)	−19.8 (−3.6)	−16.4 (2.5)	−12.9 (8.8)	−5.4 (22.3)	−3.0 (26.6)	0.8 (33.4)	3.7 (38.7)	4.2 (39.6)	−0.8 (30.6)	−4.5 (23.9)	−15.3 (4.5)	−16.5 (2.3)	−19.8 (−3.6)
Average precipitation mm (inches)	48.1 (1.89)	44.9 (1.77)	44.2 (1.74)	47.2 (1.86)	63.0 (2.48)	51.0 (2.01)	57.2 (2.25)	50.5 (1.99)	51.3 (2.02)	59.3 (2.33)	60.3 (2.37)	58.5 (2.30)	635.5 (25.02)
Average precipitation days (≥ 1.0 mm)	10.4	9.7	8.8	9.1	10.0	8.0	7.3	6.8	7.7	9.8	10.8	11.1	109.4
Average snowy days	2.4	3.7	1.2	0.4	0.0	0.0	0.0	0.0	0.0	0.0	0.8	1.8	10.3
Average relative humidity (%)	90	85	78	73	75	73	68	69	75	84	90	90	79
Average dew point °C (°F)	3 (37)	2 (36)	4 (39)	5 (41)	9 (48)	12 (54)	13 (55)	13 (55)	11 (52)	9 (48)	6 (43)	3 (37)	8 (45)
Mean monthly sunshine hours	64.1	90.9	146.1	185.8	214.7	220.1	232.0	228.5	184.5	121.4	73.8	60.9	1,822.6
Source 1: Meteociel
Source 2: Infoclimat.fr (snowy days) Time and Date

=== The Loire and navigation ===
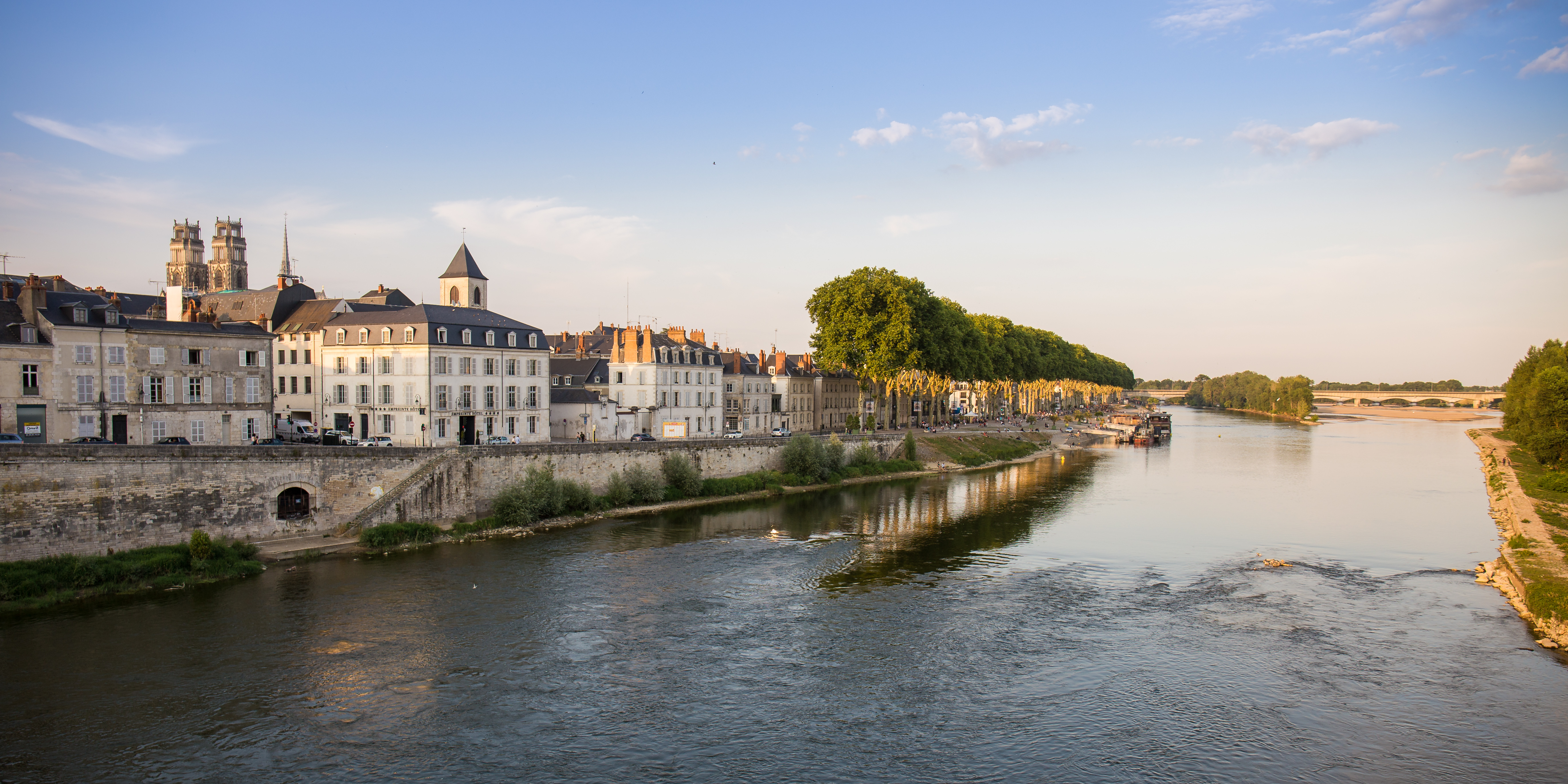
The Loire as it flows through Orléans

In Orléans, the Loire is separated by a submerged dike known as the dhuis into the Grande Loire to the north, no longer navigable, and the Petite Loire to the south. This dike is just one part of a vast system of construction that previously allowed the Loire to remain navigable to this point.

The Loire was formerly an important navigation and trading route, and is at the heart of the city's foundation in the second century BC as a center of trade or emporium. More recently, during the 17th century, the river enabled Orleans to become a major hub for refining sugar, which was imported from the Caribbean via Nantes, and whose commerce boosted other aspects of the local economy, such as sweets, chocolate manufacturing, and paper for wrapping. In the 18th century, Orleans also acquired a reputation for producing vinegar, from local vineyards as well as wine traveling up the Loire.

With the increase in size of ocean-going ships, large ships can now navigate the estuary only up to about Nantes.

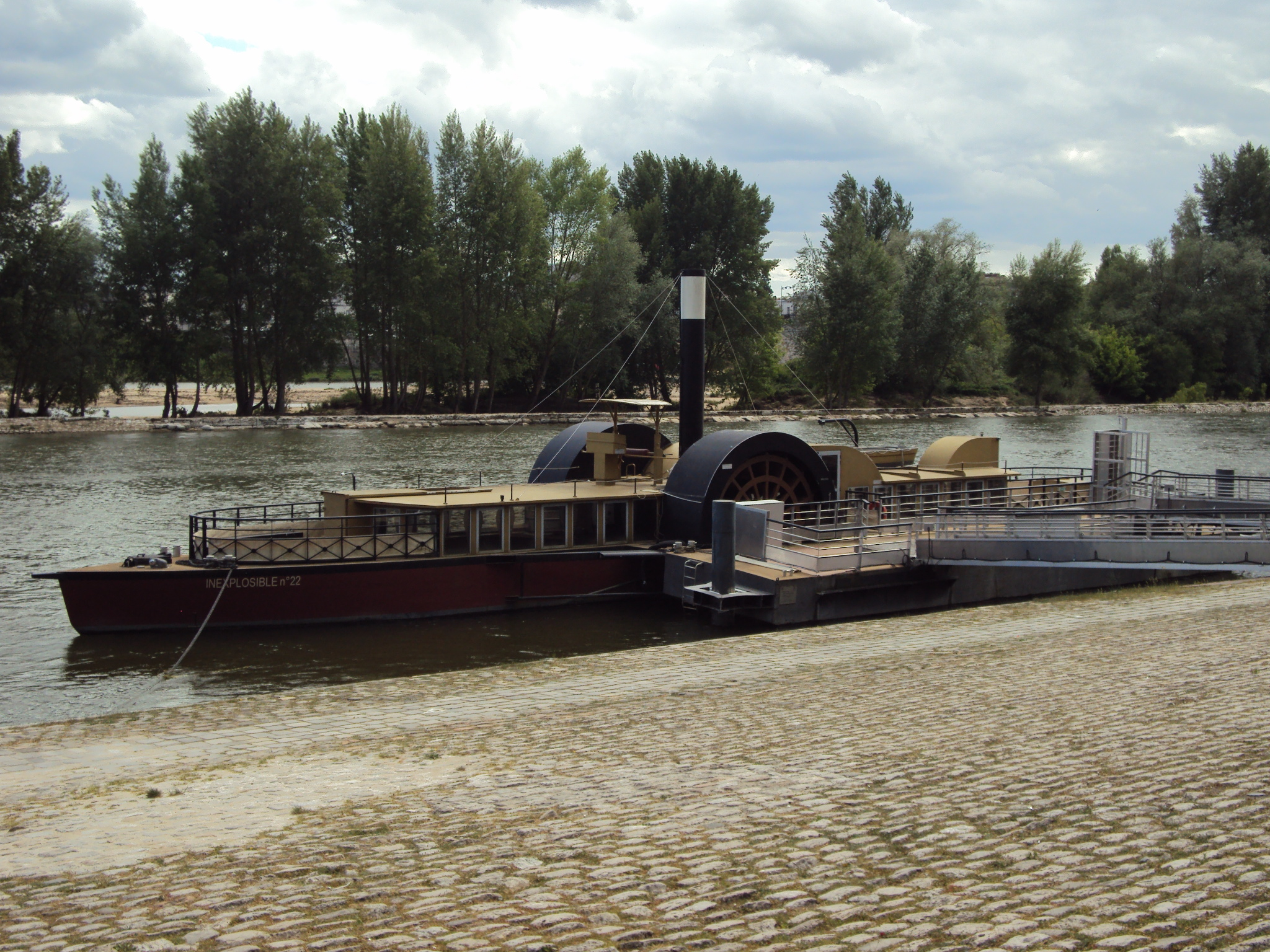
L'Inexplosible n°22, replica paddle steamer

Boats on the river were traditionally flat-bottomed boats, with large but foldable masts so the sails could gather wind from above the river banks, but the masts could be lowered in order to allow the boats to pass under bridges. These vessels are known as "gabarre", "futreau", and so on, and may be viewed by tourists near pont Royal.

The river's irregular flow strongly limits traffic on it, in particular at its ascent, though this can be overcome by boats being given a tow.

An Inexplosible-type paddle steamer owned by the mairie was put in place in August 2007, facing Place de la Loire and containing a bar.

Every two years, the Festival de Loire recalls the role played by the river in the commune's history.

On the river's north bank, near the town centre, is the Canal d'Orléans, which connects to the Canal du Loing and the Canal de Briare at Buges near Montargis. The canal is no longer used along its whole length. Its route within Orléans runs parallel to the river, separated from it by a wall or muret, with a promenade along the top. Its last pound was transformed into an outdoor swimming pool in the 1960s, then filled in. It was reopened in 2007 for the "fêtes de Loire." There are plans to revive use of the canal for recreation and install a pleasure-boat port there.

== History ==
=== Prehistory and Roman Empire ===
See also Cenabum, Aureliana Civitas.

Cenabum was a Gaul stronghold, one of the principal towns of the tribe of the Carnutes where the Druids held their annual assembly. The Carnutes were massacred and the city was destroyed by Julius Caesar in 52 BCE. In the late 3rd century CE, the city was renamed civitas Aurelianorum ("city of Aurelians »), possibly in honor of one of the many Roman Emperors bearing the nomen gentilicum around that time. The name later evolved into Orléans.

In 442 Flavius Aetius, the Roman commander in Gaul, requested Goar, head of the Iranian tribe of Alans in the region to come to Orleans and control the rebellious natives and the Visigoths. Accompanying the Vandals, the Alans crossed the Loire in 408. One of their groups, under Goar, joined the Roman forces of Flavius Aetius to fight Attila when he invaded Gaul in 451, taking part in the Battle of Châlons under their king Sangiban. Goar established his capital in Orléans. His successors later took possession of the estates in the region between Orléans and Paris. Installed in Orléans and along the Loire, they were unruly (killing the town's senators when they felt they had been paid too slowly or too little) and resented by the local inhabitants. Many inhabitants around the present city have names bearing witness to the Alan presence – Allaines. Also many places in the region bear names of Alan origin.

=== Early Middle Ages ===
In the Merovingian era, the city was capital of the Kingdom of Orléans following Clovis I's division of the kingdom, then under the Capetians it became the capital of a county then duchy held in appanage by the house of Valois-Orléans. The Valois-Orléans family later acceded to the throne of France via Louis XII, then Francis I. In 1108, Louis VI of France became one of the few French monarchs to be crowned outside of Reims when he was crowned in Orléans cathedral by Daimbert, Archbishop of Sens.

=== High Middle Ages ===
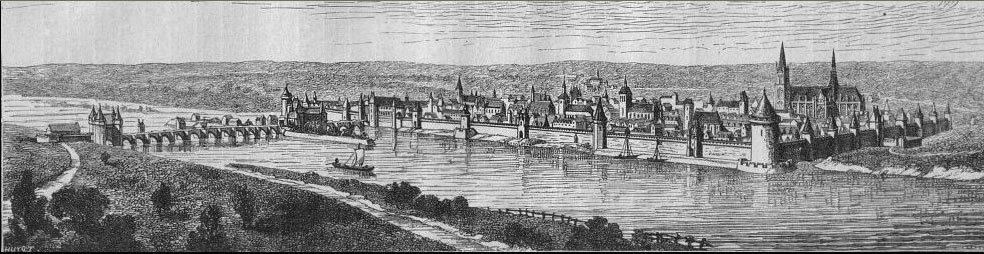
Orléans in September 1428, the time of the siege of Orléans.

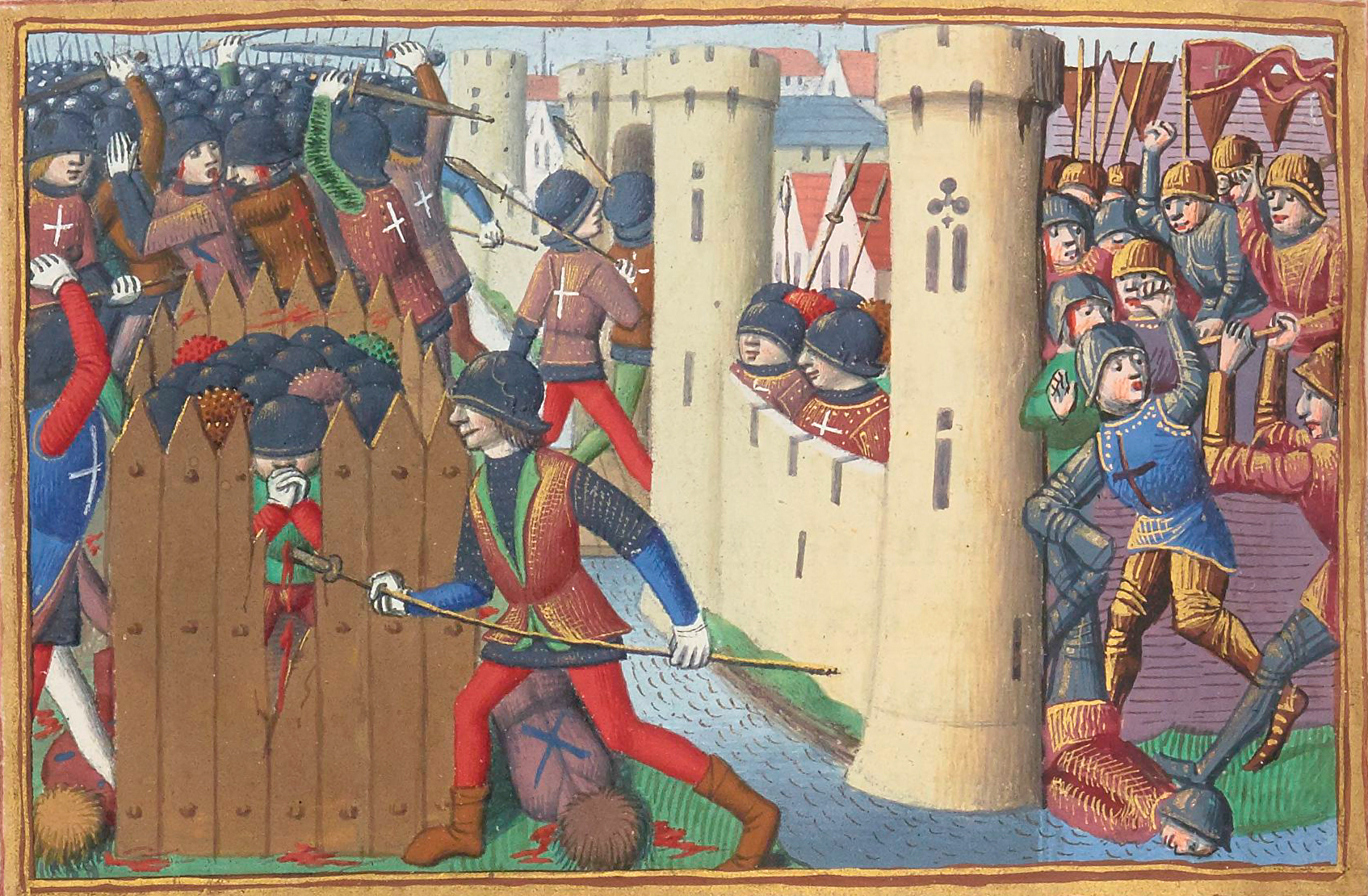
15th-century depiction of the French troops attacking an English fort at the siege of Orléans

The city was always a strategic point on the Loire, for it was sited at the river's most northerly point, and thus its closest point to Paris. There were few bridges over the dangerous river Loire, but Orléans had one of them, and so became – with Rouen and Paris – one of medieval France's three richest cities.

On the south bank the "châtelet des Tourelles" protected access to the bridge. This was the site of the battle on 8 May 1429 which allowed Joan of Arc to enter and lift the siege of the Plantagenets during the Hundred Years' War, with the help of the royal generals Dunois and Florent d'Illiers. The city's inhabitants have continued to remain faithful and grateful to her to this day, calling her "la pucelle d'Orléans" (the maid of Orléans), offering her a middle-class house in the city, and contributing to her ransom when she was taken prisoner.

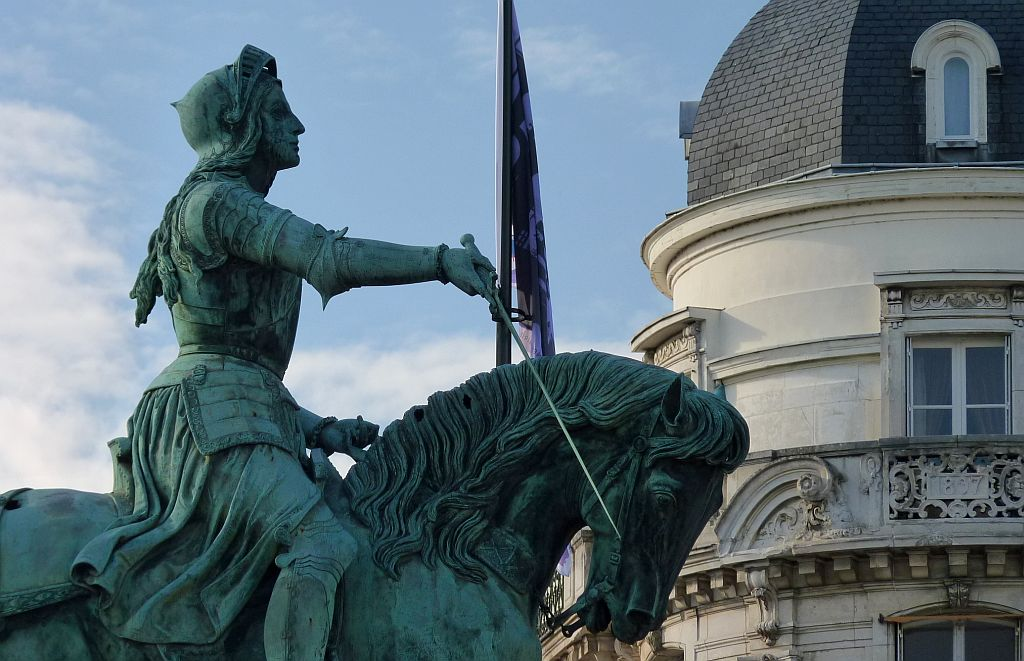
Statue of Joan of Arc, Place du Martroi

=== 1453 to 1699 ===
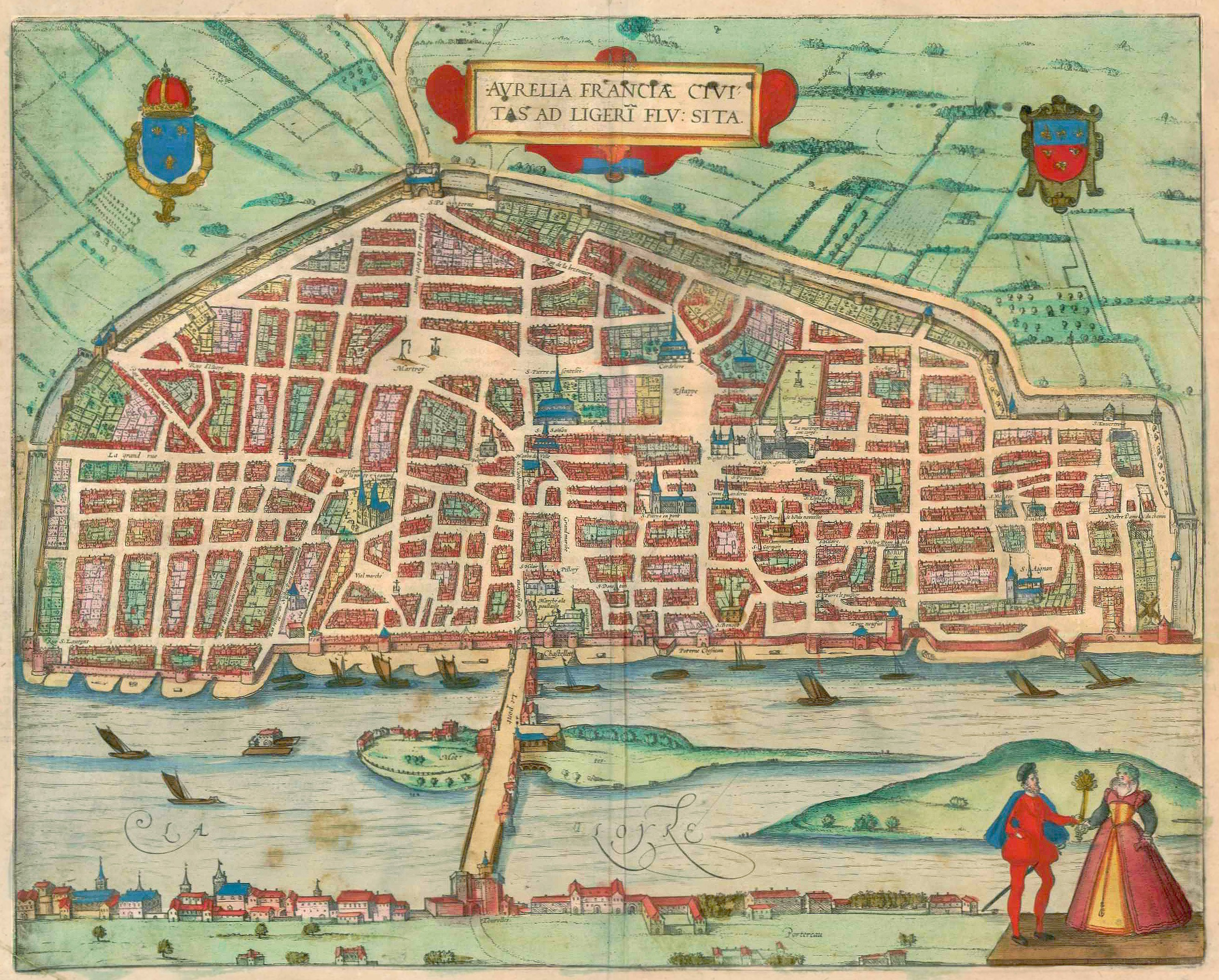
Aurelia Franciae civitas ad Ligeri flu. sita (1581)

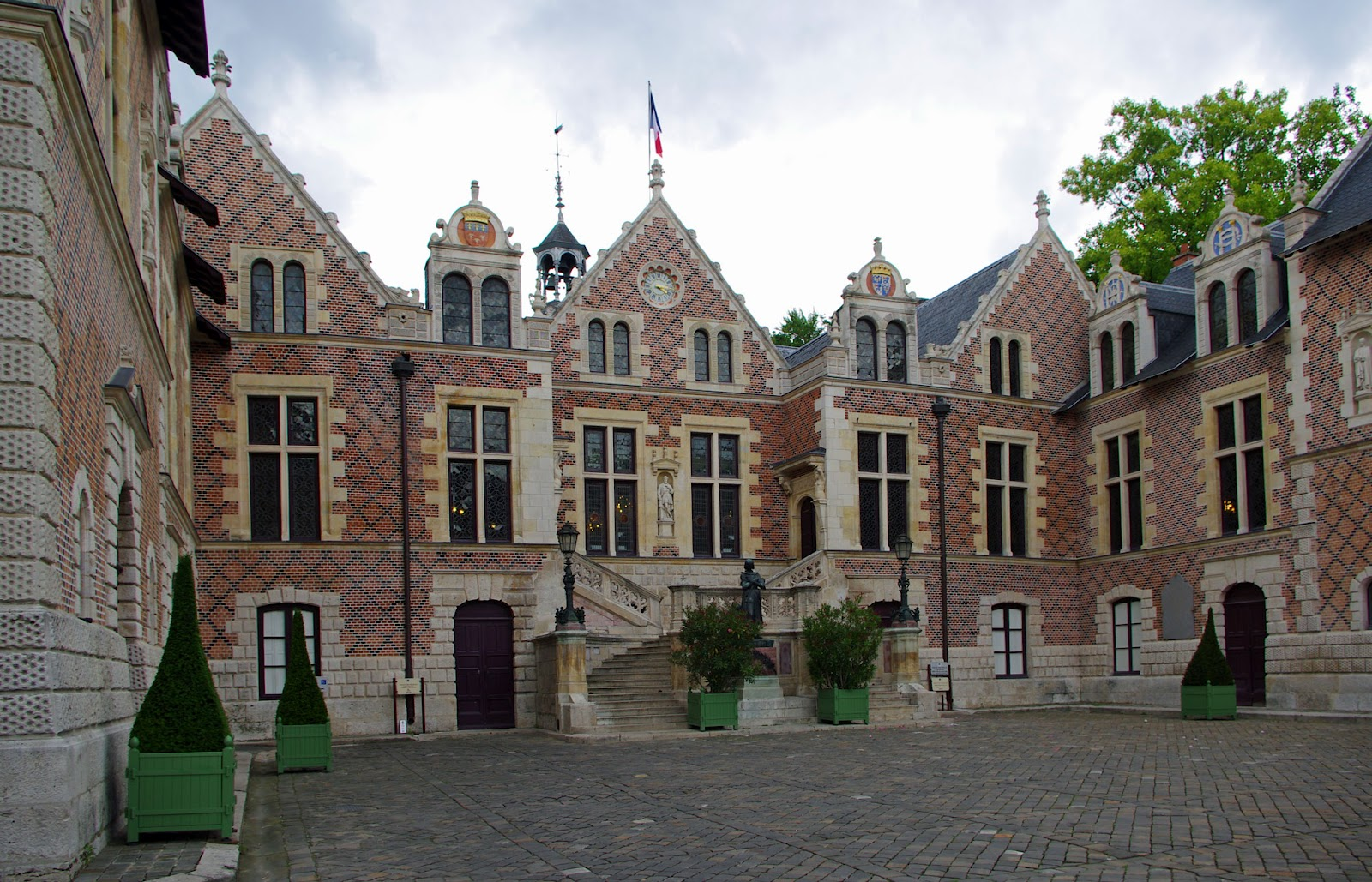
The Renaissance Hôtel Groslot

Once the Hundred Years' War was over, the city recovered its former prosperity. The bridge brought in tolls and taxes, as did the merchants passing through the city. King Louis XI also greatly contributed to its prosperity, revitalising agriculture in the surrounding area (particularly the exceptionally fertile land around Beauce) and relaunching saffron farming at Pithiviers. Later, during the Renaissance, the city benefited from its becoming fashionable for rich châtelains to travel along the Loire valley (a fashion begun by the king himself, whose royal domains included the nearby châteaus at Chambord, Amboise, Blois, and Chenonceau).

The University of Orléans also contributed to the city's prestige. Specializing in law, it was highly regarded throughout Europe. John Calvin was received and accommodated there (and wrote part of his reforming theses during his stay), and in return Henry VIII of England (who had drawn on Calvin's work in his separation from Rome) offered to fund a scholarship at the university. Many other Protestants were sheltered by the city. Jean-Baptiste Poquelin, better known by his pseudonym Molière, also studied law at the university, but was expelled for attending a carnival contrary to university rules.

From 13 December 1560 to 31 January 1561, the French States-General after the death of Francis II of France, the eldest son of Catherine de Médicis and Henry II. He died in the Hôtel Groslot in Orléans, with his queen Mary at his side.

The cathedral was rebuilt several times. The present structure had its first stone laid by Henry IV, and work on it took a century. It thus is a mix of late Renaissance and early Louis XIV styles, and one of the last cathedrals to be built in France.

=== 1700–1900 ===
When France colonised America, the territory it conquered was immense, including the whole Mississippi River (whose first European name was the River Colbert), from its mouth to its source at the borders of Canada. Its capital was named la Nouvelle-Orléans in honour of Louis XV's regent, the duke of Orléans, and was settled with French inhabitants against the threat from British troops to the north-east.

The Dukes of Orléans hardly ever visited their city since, as brothers or cousins of the king, they took such a major role in court life that they could hardly ever leave. The duchy of Orléans was the largest of the French duchies, starting at Arpajon, continuing to Chartres, Vendôme, Blois, Vierzon, and Montargis. The duke's son bore the title duke of Chartres. Inheritances from great families and marriage alliances allowed them to accumulate huge wealth, and one of them, Philippe Égalité, is sometimes said to have been the richest man in the world at the time. His son, King Louis-Philippe I, inherited the Penthièvre and Condé family fortunes.

1852 saw the creation of the Compagnies ferroviaires Paris-Orléans and its famous gare d'Orsay in Paris. In the Franco-Prussian War of 1870, the city again became strategically important thanks to its geographical position, and was occupied by the Prussians on 13 October that year. The armée de la Loire was formed under the orders of General d'Aurelle de Paladines and based itself not far from Orléans at Beauce.

=== 1900 to present ===
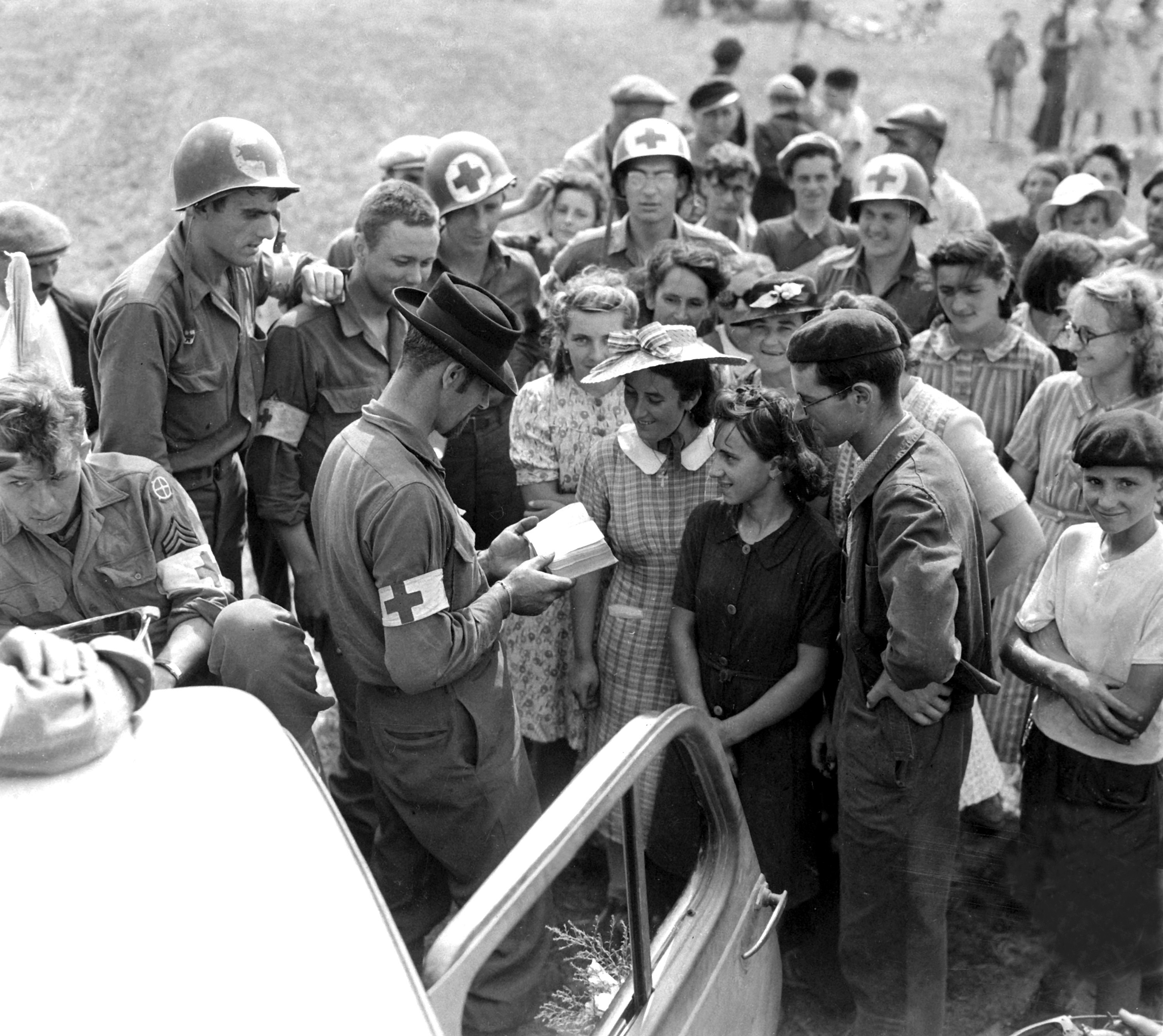
US Army medics in Orléans, 1944

During the Second World War, the German army made the Orléans Fleury-les-Aubrais railway station one of their central logistical rail hubs. The Pont Georges V was renamed "pont des Tourelles". A transit camp for deportees was built at Beaune-la-Rolande. During the war, the American Air Force heavily bombed the city and the train station, causing much damage. The city was one of the first to be rebuilt after the war: the reconstruction plan and city improvement initiated by Jean Kérisel and Jean Royer was adopted as early as 1943, and work began as early as the start of 1945. This reconstruction in part identically reproduced what had been lost, such as Royale and its arcades, but also used innovative prefabrication techniques, such as îlot 4 under the direction of the architect Pol Abraham.

In May 1969, Jewish shopkeepers in Orléans were falsely accused of abducting women from fitting rooms. Despite there being no documented cases of missing women, hostile crowds gathered outside the targeted shops. The antisemitic witch hunt attracted widespread attention from the media and authorities. The episode became the subject of an influential sociological study led by Edgar Morin and published in 1969, Rumor in Orléans (La Rumeur d'Orléans). Morin argued that the rumor targeted younger, assimilated Jewish shopkeepers who lacked visible markers of difference, reflecting an anxiety that Jews who appeared outwardly French and respectable might conceal a threatening identity beneath the surface. The study subsequently became a classic in the study of disinformation and urban legends.

=== Heraldry ===
Arms of Orléans

According to Victor Adolphe Malte-Brun in La France Illustrée, 1882, Orléans's arms are "gules, three caillous in cœurs de lys argent, and on a chief azure, three fleurs de lys Or." Charle Grandmaison, in the Dictionnaire Héraldique of 1861, states that it is "Or, with three hearts in gules", without the chief of France. Faulty designs sometimes describe it as "gules, three fleurs de lys argent, and on a chief azure three fleurs de lys Or."

The "cœurs de lys", or heart of a lily, is not a true lily, which would have 6 tepals, but a stylized or symbolic lily. Certain authors solve the problem by calling this symbol a "tiercefeuille", defined as a stemless clover leaf, with one leaf at the top and two below, thus making this coat of arms "gules, with three reversed tiercefeuilles in argent, etc".

=== Motto ===
"Hoc vernant lilia corde" (granted by Louis XII, then duke of Orléans), meaning "It is by this heart that lilies flourish" or "This heart makes lilies flourish", referring to the fleur de lys, symbol of the French royal family.

== Population ==
Historical population

Year	Pop.	±% p.a.
1793	51,500	—
1800	41,937	−2.89%
1806	42,651	+0.28%
1821	40,233	−0.39%
1831	40,161	−0.02%
1836	40,272	+0.06%
1841	42,584	+1.12%
1846	45,788	+1.46%
1851	47,393	+0.69%
1856	46,922	−0.20%
1861	50,798	+1.60%
1866	49,100	−0.68%
1872	48,976	−0.04%
1876	52,157	+1.59%
1881	57,264	+1.89%
1886	60,826	+1.21%
1891	63,705	+0.93%
1896	66,699	+0.92%
1901	67,311	+0.18%

Year	Pop.	±% p.a.
1906	68,614	+0.38%
1911	72,096	+0.99%
1921	69,048	−0.43%
1926	70,611	+0.45%
1931	71,606	+0.28%
1936	73,155	+0.43%
1946	70,240	−0.41%
1954	76,439	+1.06%
1962	84,233	+1.22%
1968	95,828	+2.17%
1975	106,246	+1.49%
1982	102,710	−0.48%
1990	105,111	+0.29%
1999	113,126	+0.82%
2007	113,234	+0.01%
2012	114,286	+0.19%
2017	116,685	+0.42%
2023	116,357	−0.05%

Source: EHESS and INSEE (1968-2023)

== Transport ==
=== Public transport ===
TAO manages buses and tram lines in Orléans. The first tram line was inaugurated 20 November 2000 and the second line on 30 June 2012. The network contains 29.3 km of rail. The annual ridership was 18.46 million in 2022.

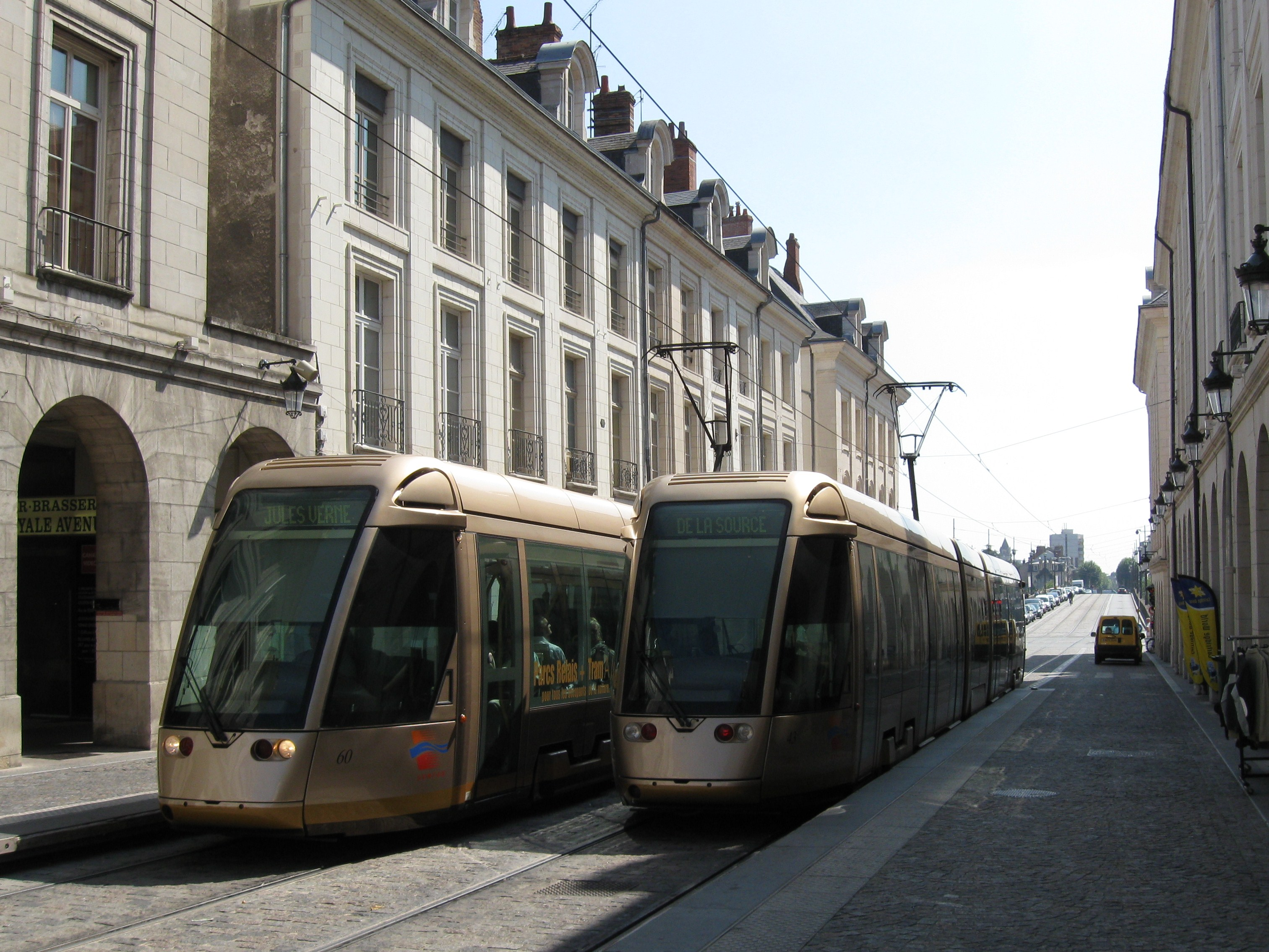
Orléans tram

=== Roads and highway ===
Orléans is an autoroute intersection: the A10 (linking Paris to Bordeaux) links to the commune outskirts, and A71 (whose bridge over the Loire is outside the commune limits) begins here, heading for the Mediterranean via Clermont-Ferrand (where it becomes the A75).

- A10 Highway From Paris to Bordeaux
- A71 Highway From Orléans to Bourges
- A19 Highway From Sens to Artenay
- National Road 20 From Paris to Spain

=== Railway ===
The central Gare d'Orléans – The station concourse

Orléans is served by two main railway stations: the central Gare d'Orléans and the Gare des Aubrais-Orléans, in the northern suburbs. Most long-distance trains call only at the Les Aubrais-Orléans station, which offers connections to Paris, Lille, Tours, Brive-la-Gaillarde, Nevers, and several regional destinations.

== People ==
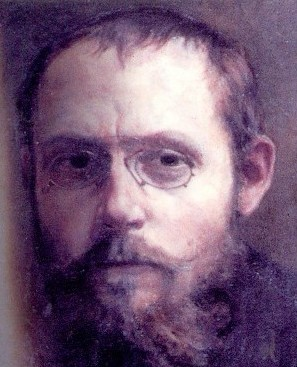
Charles Peguy

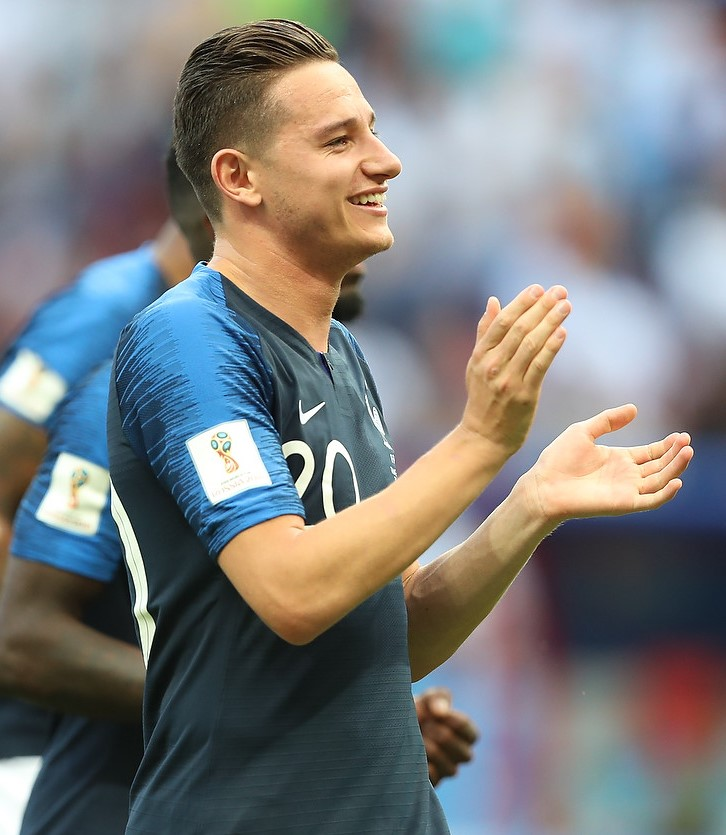
Florian Thauvin

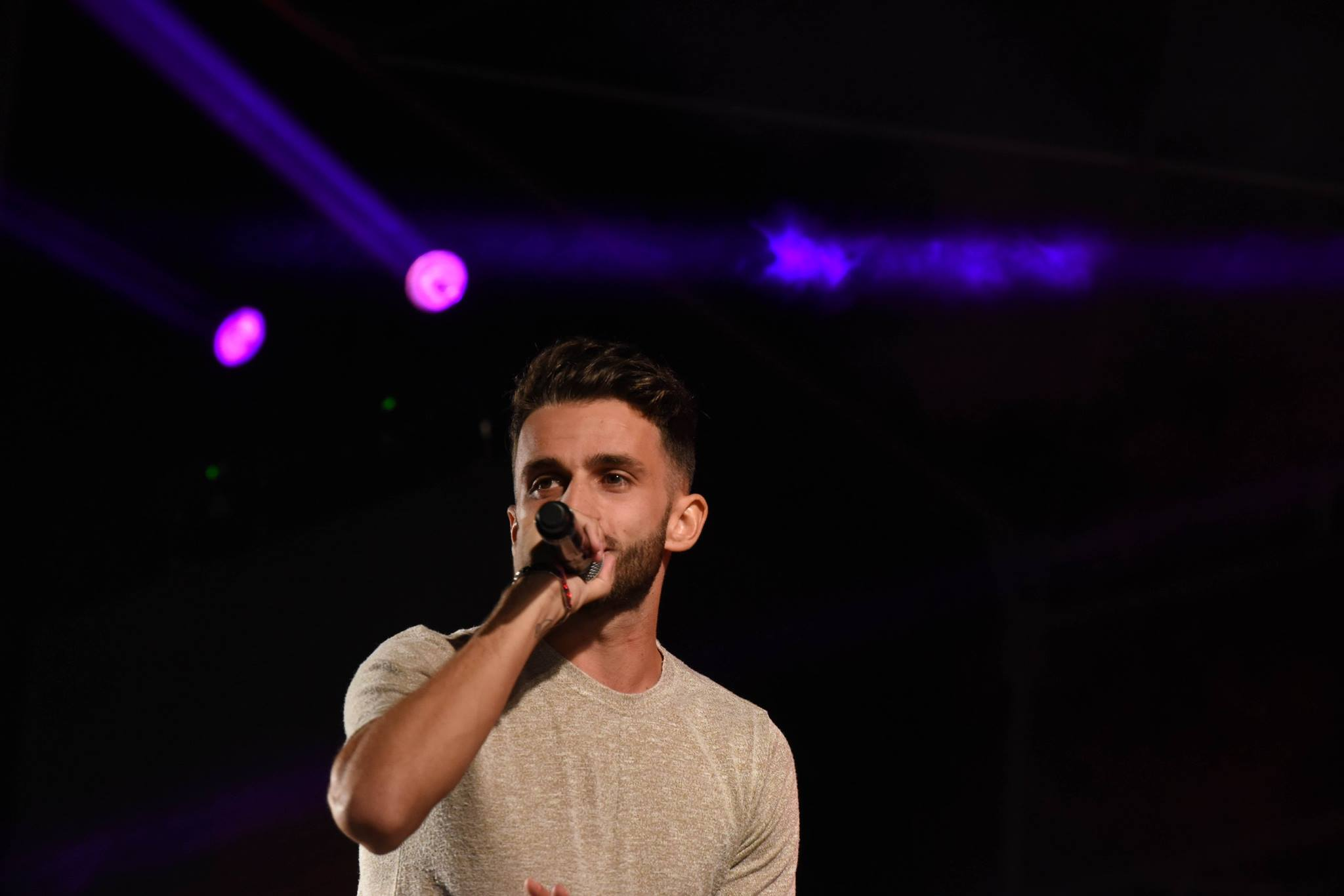
Ridsa

Orléans is the birthplace of:

- Sophie Adriansen (born 1982), French writer
- Patrick Barul (born 1977), football player
- Joelly Belleka (born 1995), basketball player
- Raoul Blanchard (1877–1965), geographer
- Maxence Boitez (Ridsa) (born 1990), singer
- Patrick Bornhauser (born 1957), racing driver
- Raymond Brugère (1885–1966), diplomat.
- Jean-Baptiste Marc Bourgery (1797–1849), anatomist
- Florence Cadier (born 1956), children's author
- Félix Cazot (1790–1857), classical pianist and composer
- Philippe Chanlot (born 1967), football player
- Marion Cotillard (born 1975), actress, not born in Orléans, but grew up there
- Gilles Delouche (1948–2020), linguist
- Satchela Evrard Djedje (Vegedream) (born 1992), singer
- Étienne Dolet (1509–1546), scholar and printer
- Joël-François Durand (born 1954), composer
- Jean-Louis Ferrary (1948–2020), historian
- Georges Fleury (1878–1968), cyclist
- Albert Gombault (1844–1904), neurologist
- Guillaume Gomez (born 1969), racing driver
- Jacques Guillemeau (1550–1613), physician
- Albert Guyot (1881–1947), racing driver
- Étienne Hubert (1567–1614), Arabist
- Gaston d'Illiers (1876–1932), sculptor
- Isaac Jogues (1607–1646), Jesuit missionary
- Stanislas Julien (1797–1873), orientalist
- Gustave Lanson (1857–1934), historian
- Pierre Levesville (1570–1632), Renaissance architect
- Anatole Loquin (1834–1903), writer and musicologist
- Yven Moyo (born 1992), football player
- Yves-Marie Pasquet (born 1947), composer
- Charles Péguy (1873–1914), poet and essayist
- Antoine Petit (1722–1794), physician
- Lamine Sambe (born 1989), basketball player
- Yacine Sene (born 1982), basketball player
- Florian Thauvin (born 1993), football player
- Christophe Tinseau (born 1969), racing driver
- Jean Zay (1904–1944), jurist and politician
- Amélie Élie (1878–1933), prostitute and Queen of the Apaches

== Culture ==
=== Historical landmarks ===
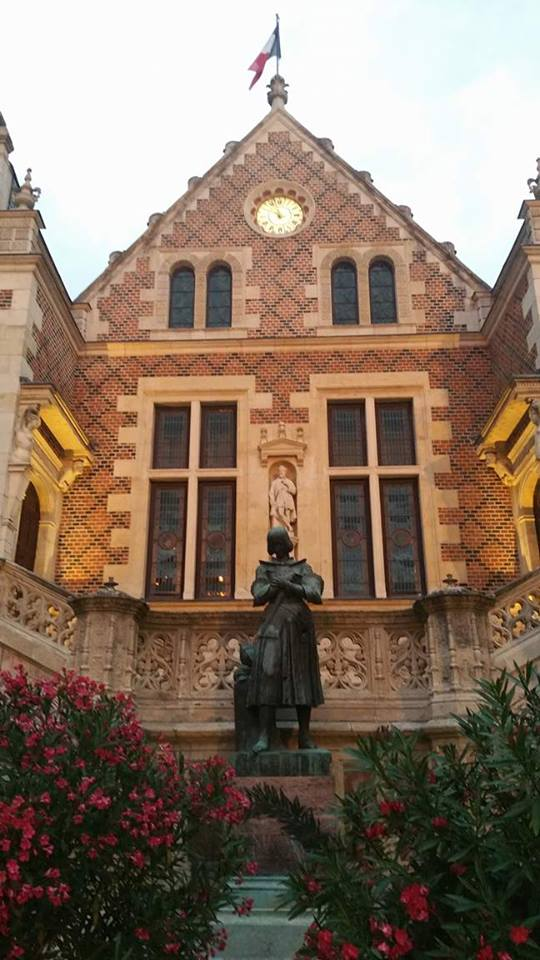
Former City Hall and Joan of Arc statue

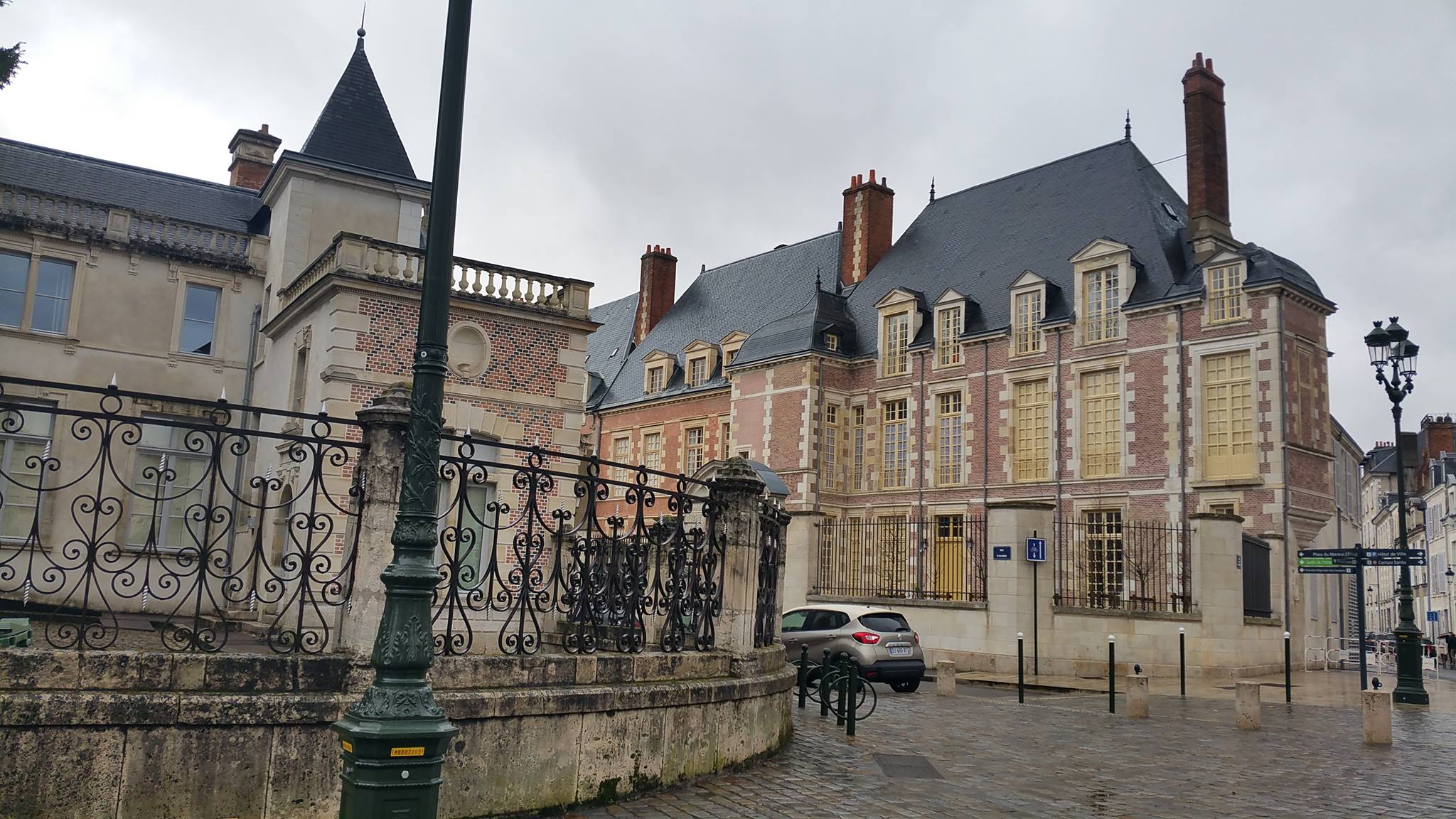
16th/17th buildings found rue de l'Escure, in front of the Hôtel Groslot

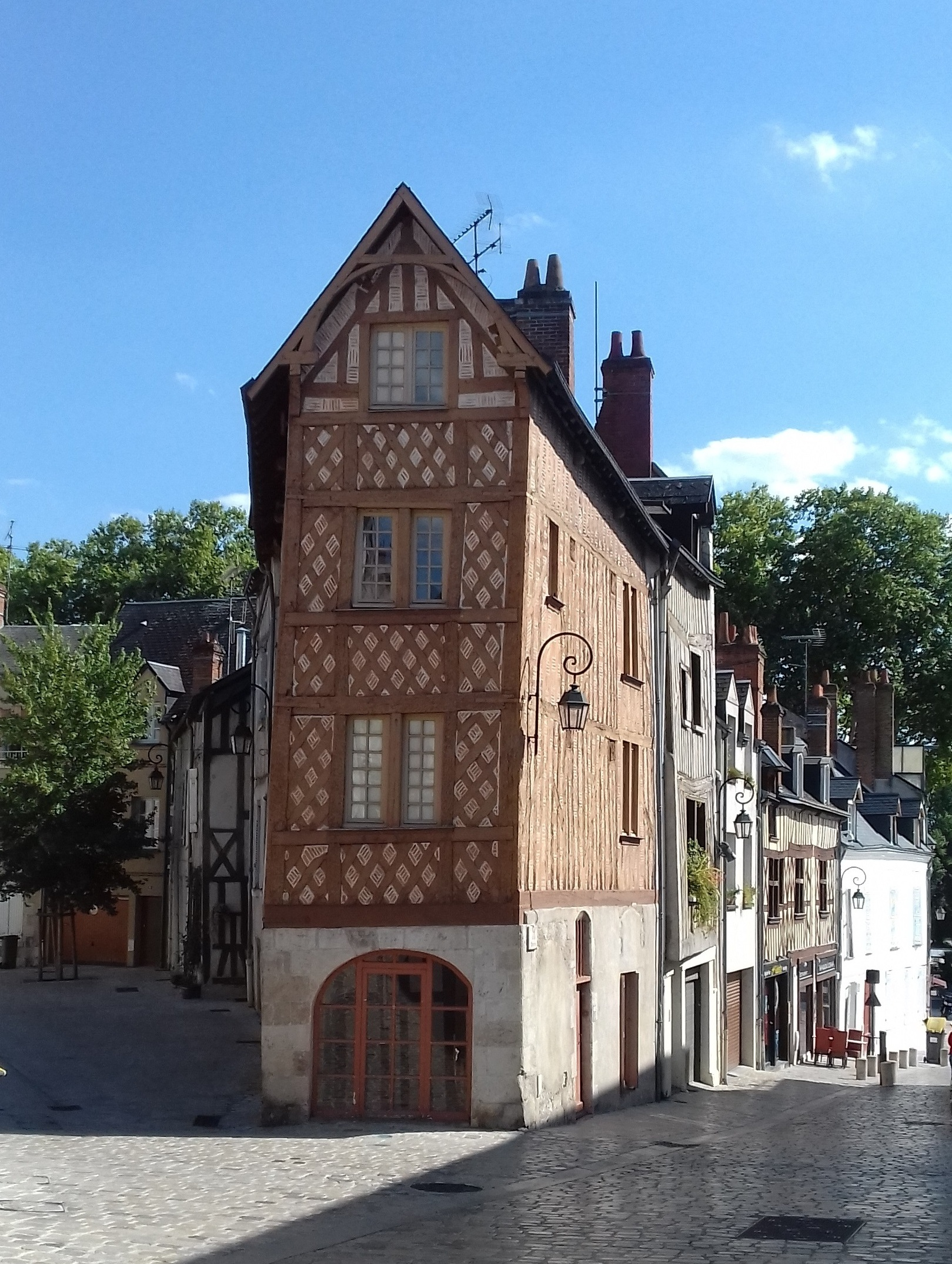
A half-timbered house in Orleans

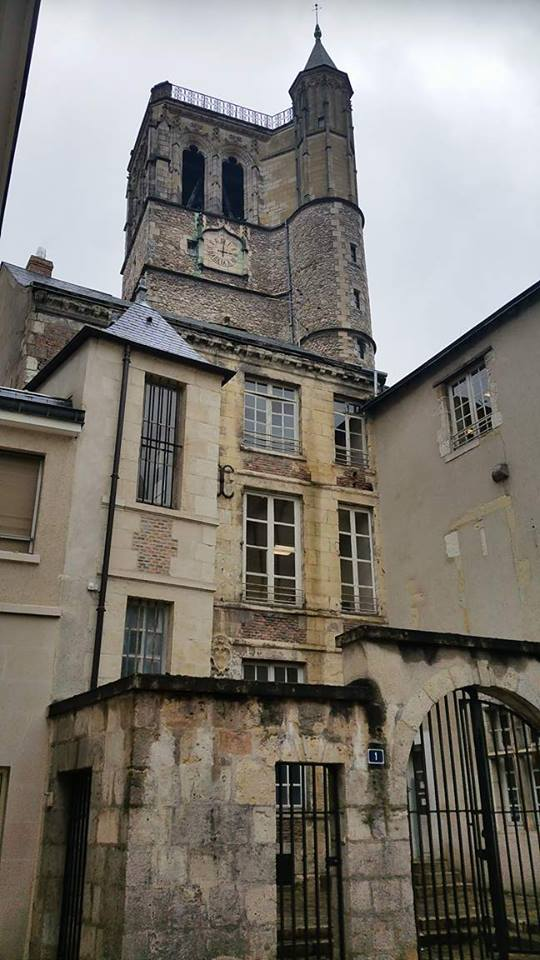
15th century city hall tower

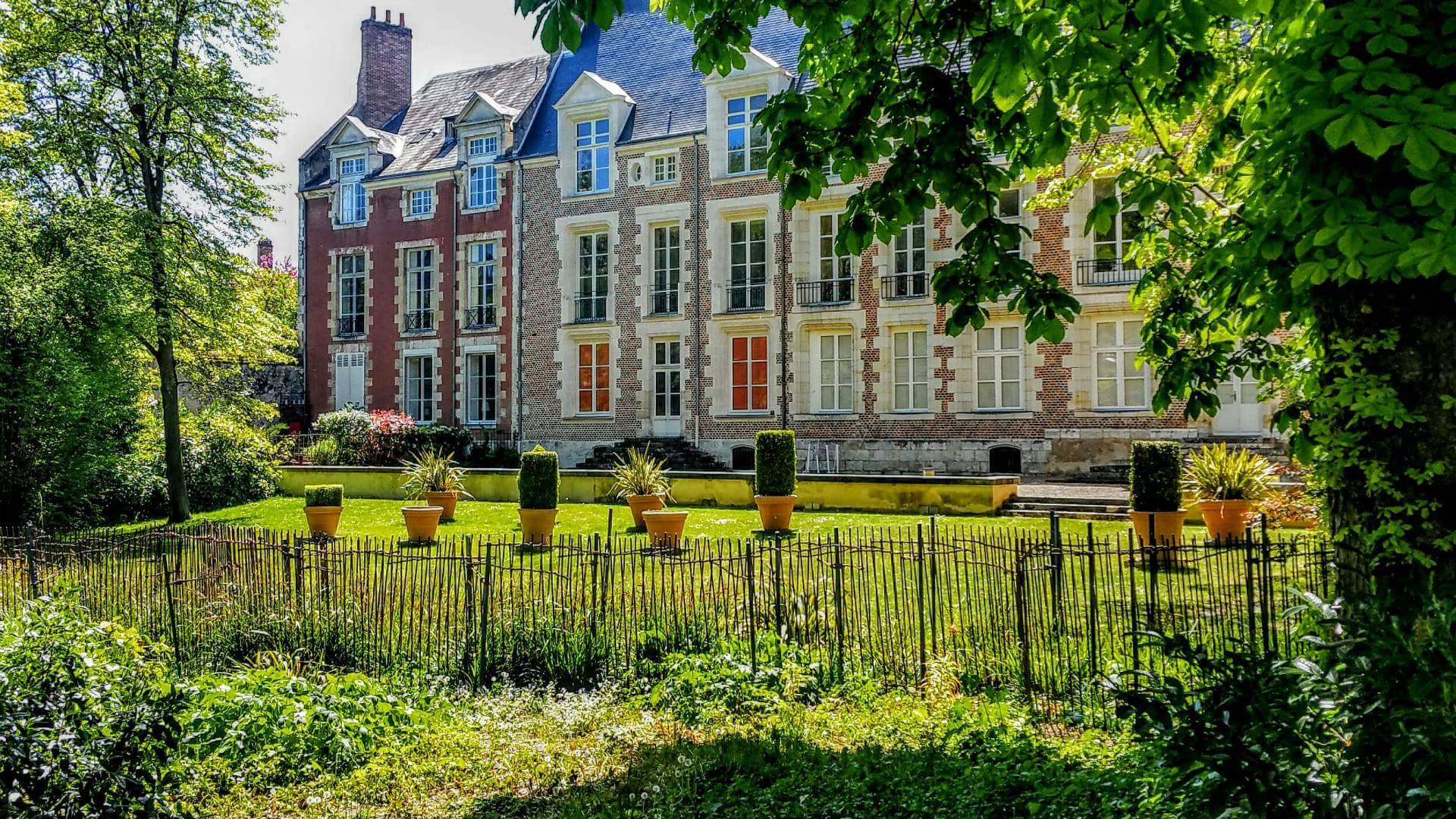
View from the public park, rue d'Alsace-Lorraine

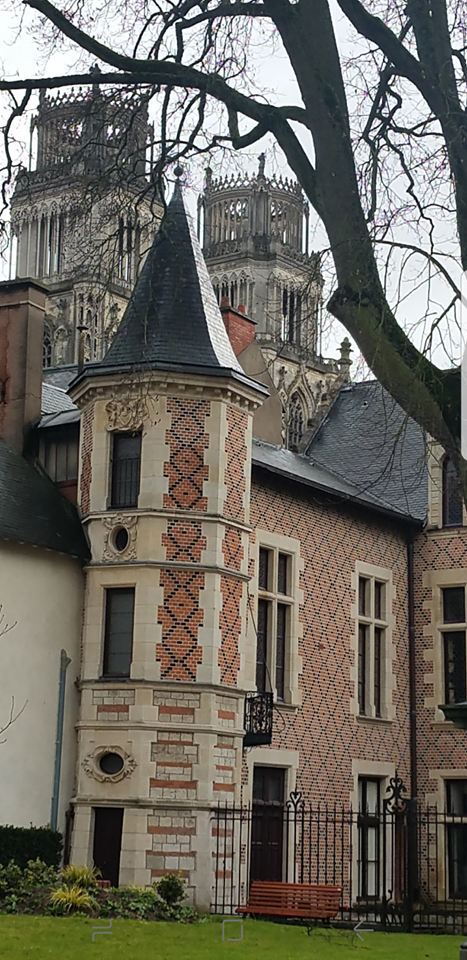
View of the Cathedral and the Hotel Groslot, from the Hotel public park

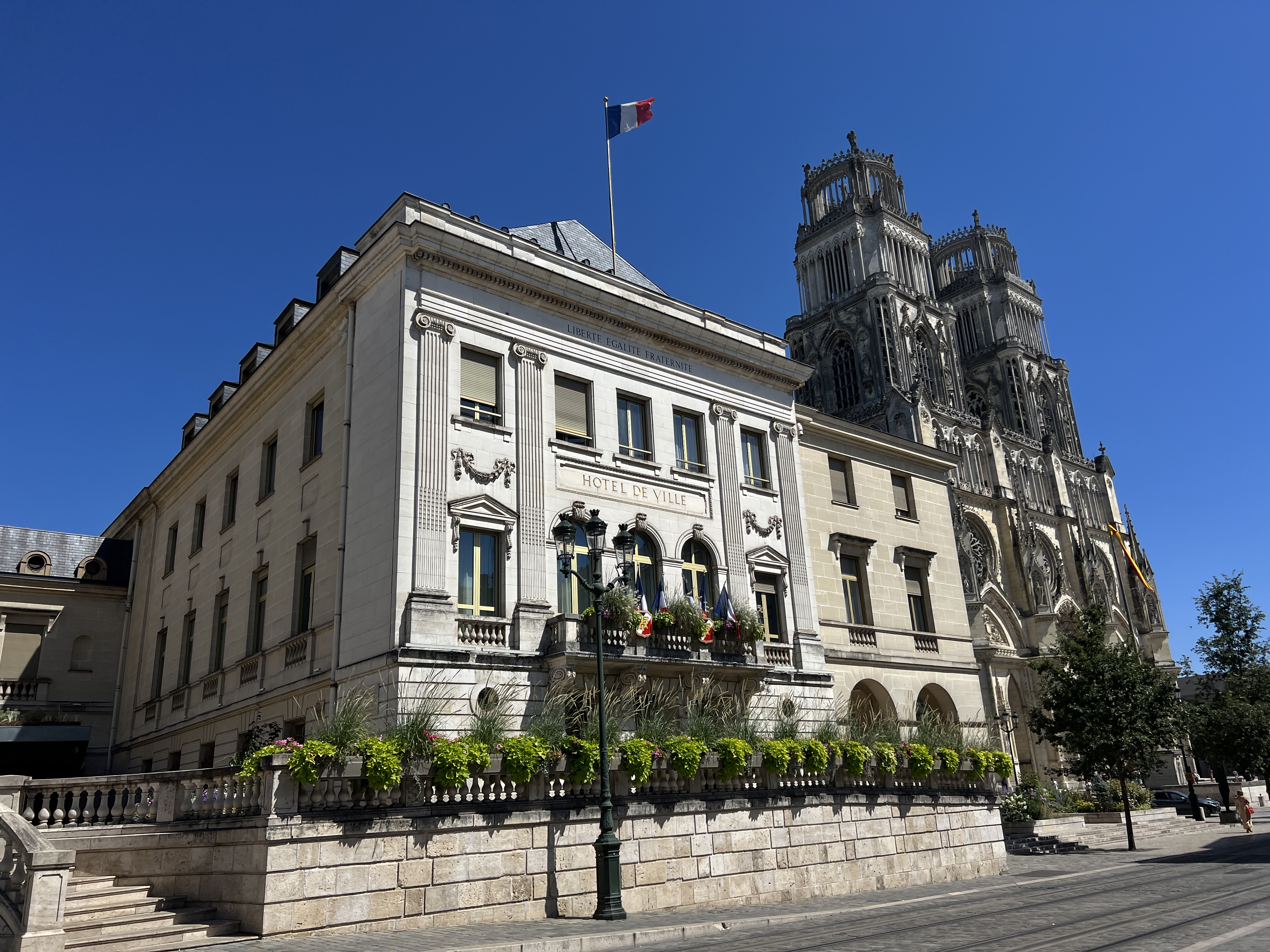
The current Hôtel de Ville

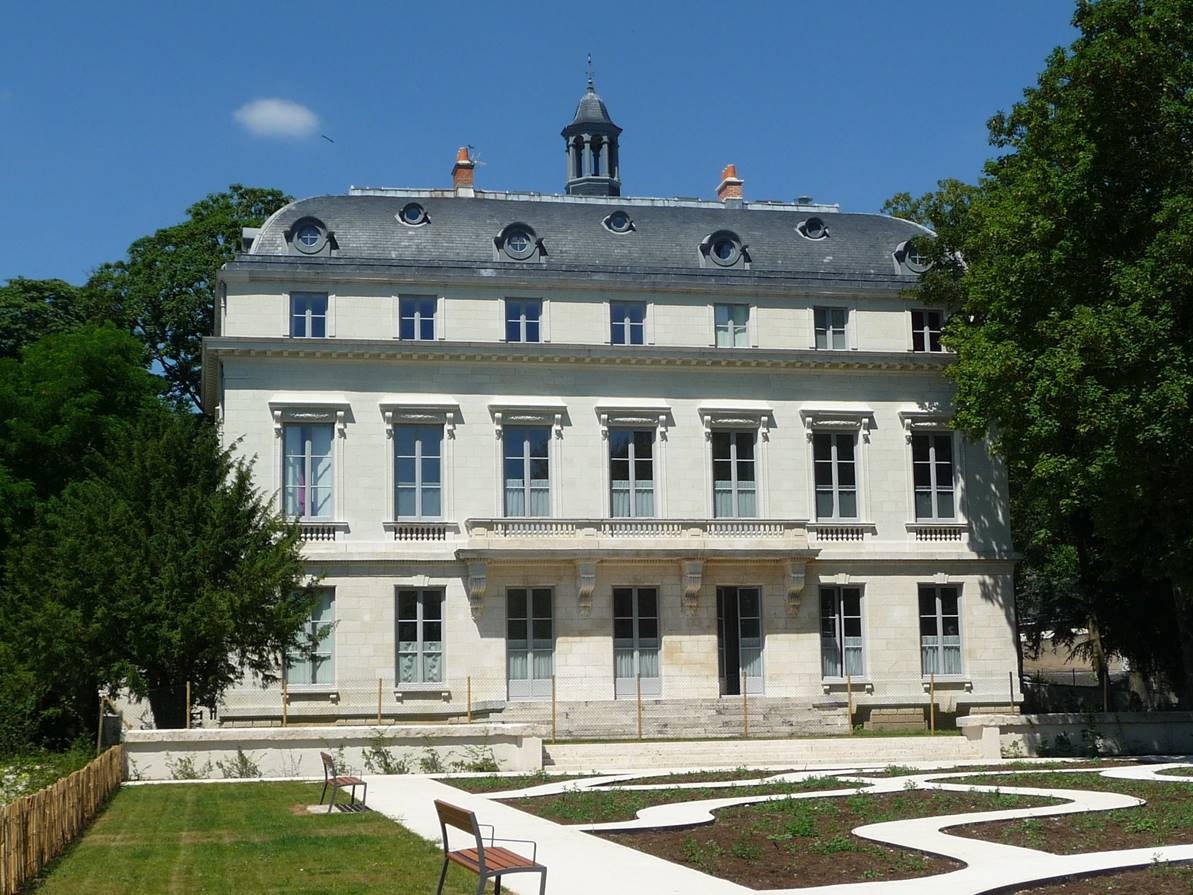
View from the public park of the palace

- The Gallo-Roman town-wall on the north side of the cathedral (4th century AD) and along the rue de la Tour-Neuve
- The Hôtel Groslot, built between 1550 and 1555 for Jacques Groslot, "bailli d'Orléans" by Jacques Ier Androuet du Cerceau. King François II of France died there in 1560. Kings Charles IX, Henri III of France and Henri IV of France stayed there. The "Hôtel" was restored in 1850. The building became the town Hall of Orléans in 1790 (weddings are still celebrated inside), before the council moved to the current Hôtel de Ville in 1981.
- The hôtel de la Vieille Intendance (early 15th century) (otherwise named hôtel Brachet, formerly "The King's house"), real gothic-renaissance style château made of bricks. Nowadays housing the Administrative Court of Orléans. One can admire its frontage from the entrance in the rue de la Bretonnerie. Yet, the building – which sheltered the highest figures of the kingdom passing by the city, and maybe some kings themselves (Henri IV, Louis XIII, Louis XIV of France) – can easily be observed from its gardens, opened to the public (entrance rue d'Alsace-Lorraine).
- The hôtel de la Motte-Sanguin (18th century) and its gardens, manor built at the behest of Louis-Philippe, Duke of Orléans (1747–1793), cousin of the King Louis XVI. He was surnamed "Philippe Égalité" / "equality" referring to his support to the 1789 revolutionaries. Nicknamed "the richest man on earth" he voted in favour of the death penalty against his own cousin the king Louis XVI, and suffered the same fate himself. This is a classic style princely residence (and even royal, since Philippe Égalité's heir accessed the throne of France under the name of Louis-Philippe Ier). It is part of a public park opened to the public (via the Solférino street).
- The school of artillery, next to the Hôtel de la Motte-Sanguin which it is often confused with, formerly housing a military school, it was built in the 19th century near the Loire.
- Remains of the University of Orléans (a 15th-century building housing the thesis room), founded in 1306 by pope Clement V, in which, among many other great historical figures, the Protestant John Calvin studied and taught. The university was so famous that it attracted students from all over Europe, particularly Germany. The city of Orléans is one of the cradles of Protestantism.
- The House of Louis XI (end of the 15th century), on Saint-Aignan square. Built at the behest of the king, who particularly revered Saint Aignan.
- The House of Joan of Arc, where she stayed during the siege of Orléans (this is actually an approximate reconstitution, the original building being bombed in 1940 during the Battle of France).
- Place du Martroi, heart of the city, with the equestrian statue of Joan of Arc at its centre, made by Denis Foyatier. This statue was damaged during the Second World War, then repaired by Paul Belmondo, father of the famous 1950s to 1980s French actor.
- Duke of Orléans's Chancellerie (XVIIIe), located next to the Place du Matroi, also bombed during the Second World War, only the frontage resisted.
- The Bannier gate-house, discovered in 1986 under the statue of Joan of Arc (Place du Martroi). It was built in the 14th century. It can be seen through a window in the subterranean car-park under the square, or visited under certain conditions.
- The rue de Bourgogne and surrounding streets, Orléans's main street since the Antiquity, it's the former Roman decumanus, crossing the city from east to west. Joan of Arc entered the city in 1429 by the "Bourgogne" gatehouse situated at its Easter end. Until today it is still giving access to the "Préfecture", where the "Préfet" (officer who represents the French State in the Region) lives, many pubs, night clubs, restaurants and shops such as the "Galeries Lafayette". It is more than a mile long. One can admire many medieval houses on its sides.
- The Tour Blanche / White Tower, it is one of the only medieval defensive towers remaining in the city (still in use at the time of the siege of Orléans). It nowadays houses the city's archaeological department.
- The Docks, (Port of Orléans) once the most important inland port of France (18th century). While boats could not sail on the river Seine because of the windings, they could sail to Orléans on the river Loire with the wind in their back. Then the merchandise was brought to Paris by roadways. Wine, and sugar from the colonies, were shipped to Orléans where they were stored and refined. Vinegar is still a city speciality due to the lapsing of wine stocks during the shipment. One can admire the old pavement of the docks (18th and 19th centuries) on the north bank of the river in the city and on the island in the middle, that was used to channel the water.
- The Hôpital Madeleine (former hospital), built by King Louis XIV (18th century) and his successors (notably an important part of the 18th century).
- Saint-Charles chapel, located within the grounds of the Madeleine Hospital, it was built in 1713 by Jacques V Gabriel, one of Louis XIV's architects.
- The Hôtel Cabu, otherwise named house of Diane de Poitiers, built at the behest of Philippe Cabu, barrister, in 1547, famous architect Jacques Ier Androuet du Cerceau providing the plans.
- The Hôtel Hatte, 16th century. Today's Charles-Péguy Center.
- The Hôtel Toutin, 16th century
- The Hôtel Pommeret d'Orléans, 16th century
- The Hôtel Ducerceau, 16th century
- The maison de la coquille, 16th century
- The Hôtel des Créneaux, former city hall, flanked by its bell tower (15th century). It nowadays houses the city's school of music. This is a magnificent piece of late gothic secular architecture (15th century) that calls to mind the famous and much more recent Parisian city hall.
- The House of Jean Dalibert, 16th century
- The Study of Jacques Bouchet (16th century), which can be admired from the public square "Jacques Bouchet"
- The mansions, rue d'Escure (17th and 18th centuries)
- The "Préfecture" : former Benedictine monastery, built in 1670 and housing the "Préfecture du Loiret" since 1800.
- The Pont de l'Europe, designed by Santiago Calatrava, is an inclined bow-string ark bridge particularly original.
- The Pont Royal / George V Royal bridge, the oldest bridge of the city. Built between 1751 and 1760, at the request of Daniel-Charles Trudaine, administrator and civil engineer. It was renamed in honour of King George V after the World War I out of respect of Britain's role in the war.
- The Pont des Tourelles, built in 1140 and demolished in 1760, was the first stone-made bridge of Orléans. When the river Loire is low, one can see remains of it in the water.
- The Palais épiscopal d'Orléans, former Bishop's Palace. It was built between 1635 and 1641. Napoléon stayed there. It is nowadays housing the international centre for research, part of University of Orléans.
- The courthouse (18th to 20th centuries)
- The "salle de l'Institut", located on the "place Sainte Croix", is a small concert hall which can be converted into a ballroom. Its acoustics are remarkable.
- Mansions, rue de la Bretonnerie. This street concentrates many particular mansions, of all styles and ages (15th to 20th centuries). High society members, politicians, barristers, doctors... continue to live there.
- Mansions, rue d'Alsace-Lorraine, 19th-century bourgeoisie style houses.
- Statue La Baigneuse by Paul Belmondo, aside the rue Royale (1955).
- Statue of Calvin, by Daniel Leclercq, facing the Calvinist temple (2009).
- The FRAC Centre building named "Les turbulences", an advanced piece of architecture covered with L.E.Ds.
- Memorial Museum to the Children of Vel d'Hiv at the Centre d'étude et de recherche sur les camps d'internement du Loiret (Study and Research Centre on the Internment Camps in Loiret), commemorating over 4,000 Jewish children who were concentrated at the Vélodrome d´Hiver cycling arena in Paris in July 1942, after which they were interned at either Pithiviers or Beaune-la-Rolande, and eventually deported to the Auschwitz extermination camp.
- Many historical houses and mansions (hundreds) can still be admired in the city centre, which is one of the largest in France due to the great importance of the city until the 20th century. The historical centre dating back to the 15th century extends far beyond the limits of the pedestrian sector that has been extensively restored in the past few years. In fact it corresponds to the portion of the modern city which is enclosed by the Boulevards. Many historical monuments remain in the non-pedestrian sectors of the city (for example, at rue Notre-Dame-de-Recouvrance, at rue des Carmes, at rue de la Bretonnerie, at Square Saint-Aignan).

=== Museums ===
Museums in Orléans:

- Musée des Beaux-Arts d'Orléans
- Charles Péguy Centre
- Joan of Arc's House
- Fine Arts Museum
- City Historical and Archeological Museum
- Natural Science Museum

=== Parks ===
Parks in Orléans:

- Parc Floral de la Source
- Motte Sanguin garden
- Charpenterie garden
- Botanic garden
- Anjorrant park
- Charbonnière park
- Moins Roux park
- Pasteur park

=== Media ===
- TV network: Orléans TV
- Newspaper: La République du Centre (the Republic of the Centre)
- Radio station: Radio Campus Orléans 88.3 FM

=== Music ===
- Annual week-long classical music festival Semaines musicales internationales d'Orléans, founded in 1968.
- Burning Heads

=== Sport ===
Orléans has a basketball team: Orléans Loiret Basket which is in the French first division. The club won the "Coupe de France" of basketball, its first major trophy, in the season 2009 – 2010.

Orléans also has a football club, the US Orléans, which plays in Championnat National.

There is also a semi-professional rugby team, RC Orléans.

The city also has very well known clubs in karate, fencing and judo.

In 2012, Orléans hosted a stage finish of Paris–Nice.

== Twin towns – sister cities ==
Orléans is twinned with:

- Dundee, United Kingdom
- Treviso, Italy
- Münster, Germany
- Kristiansand, Norway
- Wichita, United States
- Tarragona, Spain
- Saint-Flour, France
- Utsunomiya, Japan
- Lugoj, Romania
- Yangzhou, China
- New Orleans, United States
- Kraków, Poland
- Parakou, Benin

== Education ==
- University of Orléans: the university campus is in the La Source area in southern part of the commune.

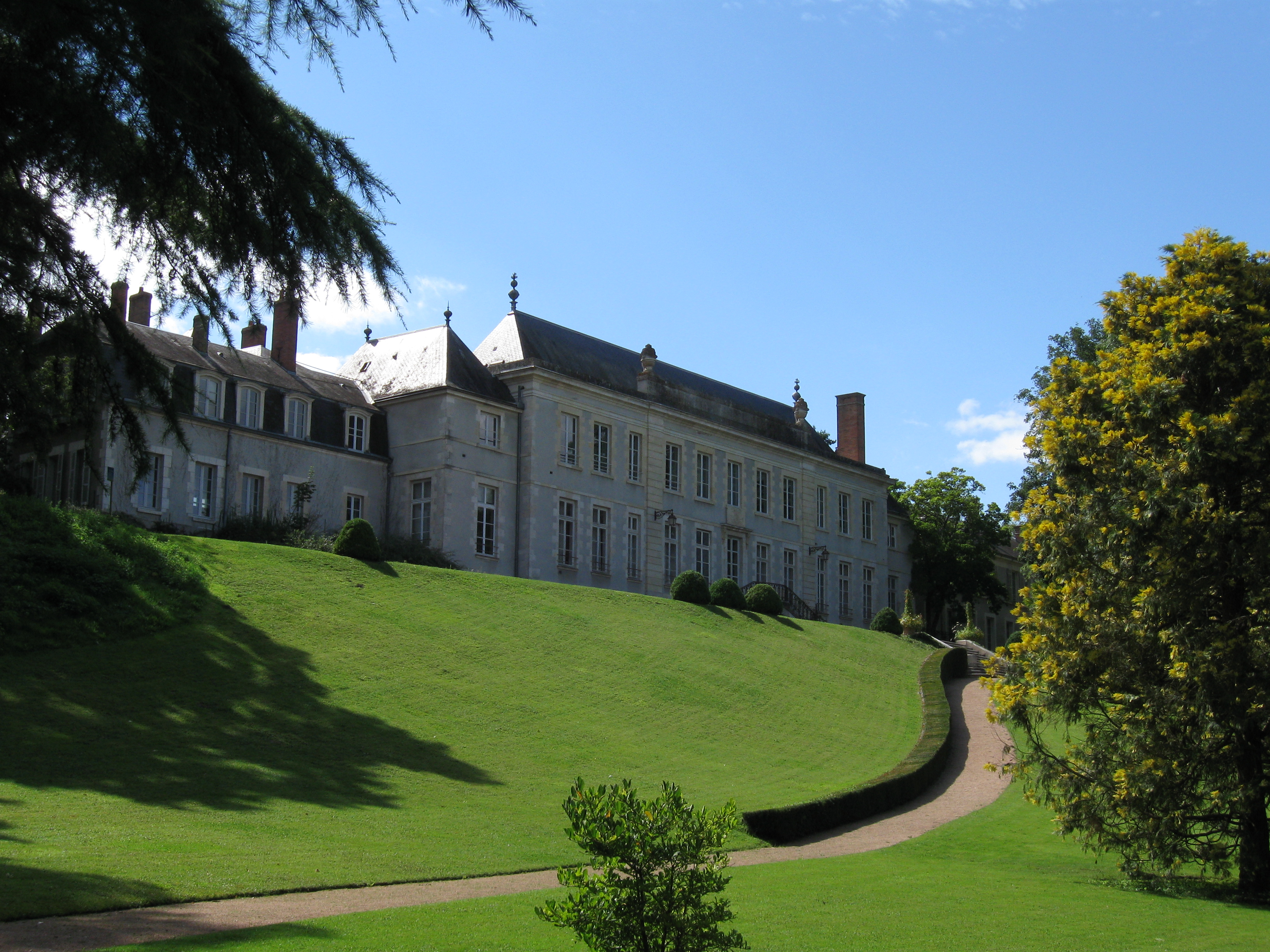
The university campus. Château de la Source

- Polytech Orléans: Engineer school
- IUT: University Institutes of Technology
- IAE: Institut d'Administration des Entreprises
- IUP: Institut universitaire professionnalisé
- ESAD Orléans: School of Art and Design
- ESCEM: School of Business and Management
- SUPINFO: Higher education in Computer Science
- EXIA CESI: School of Industrial Engineering

== Gallery ==
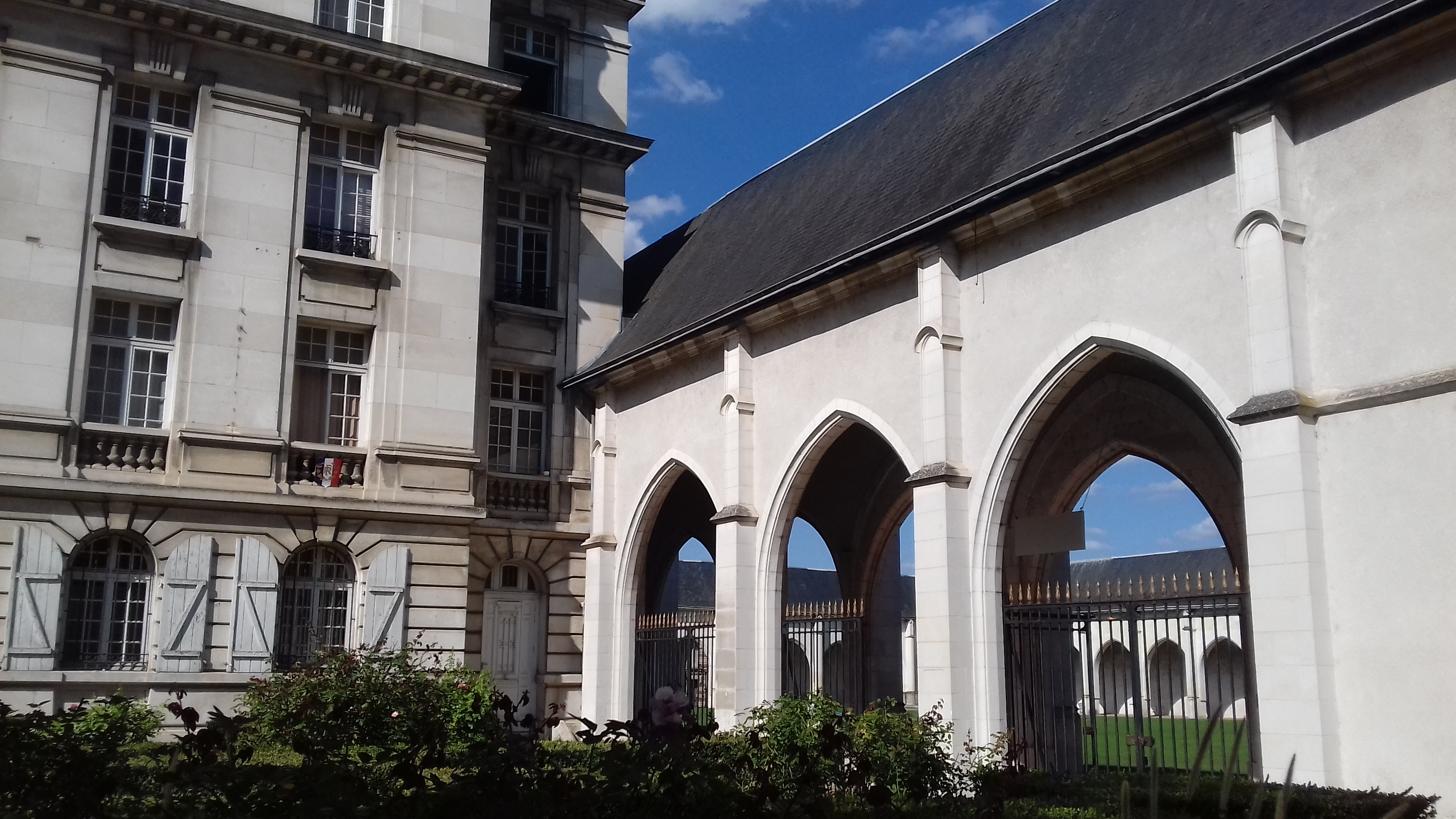
Campo Santo.

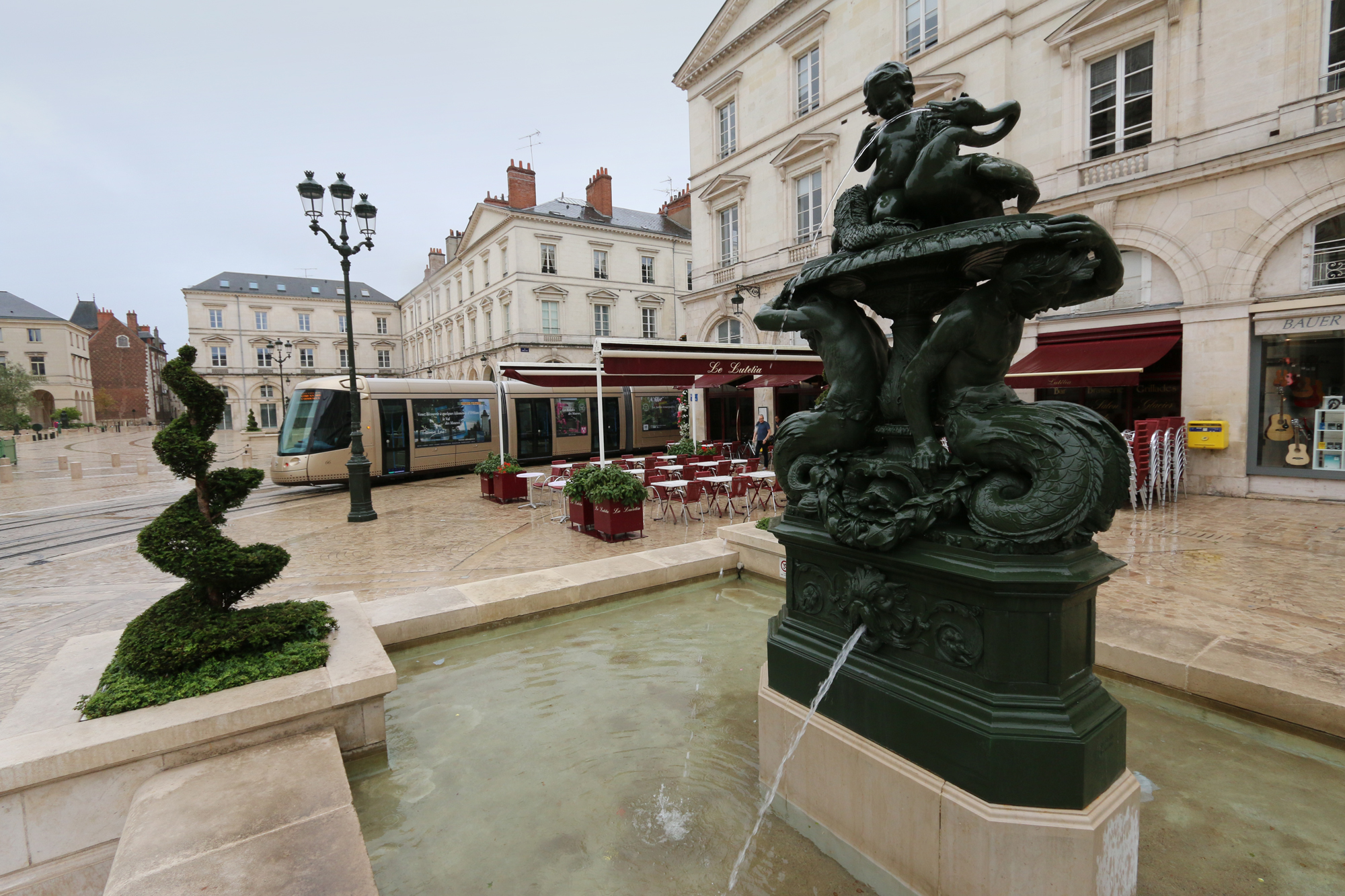
Place Sainte-Croix.

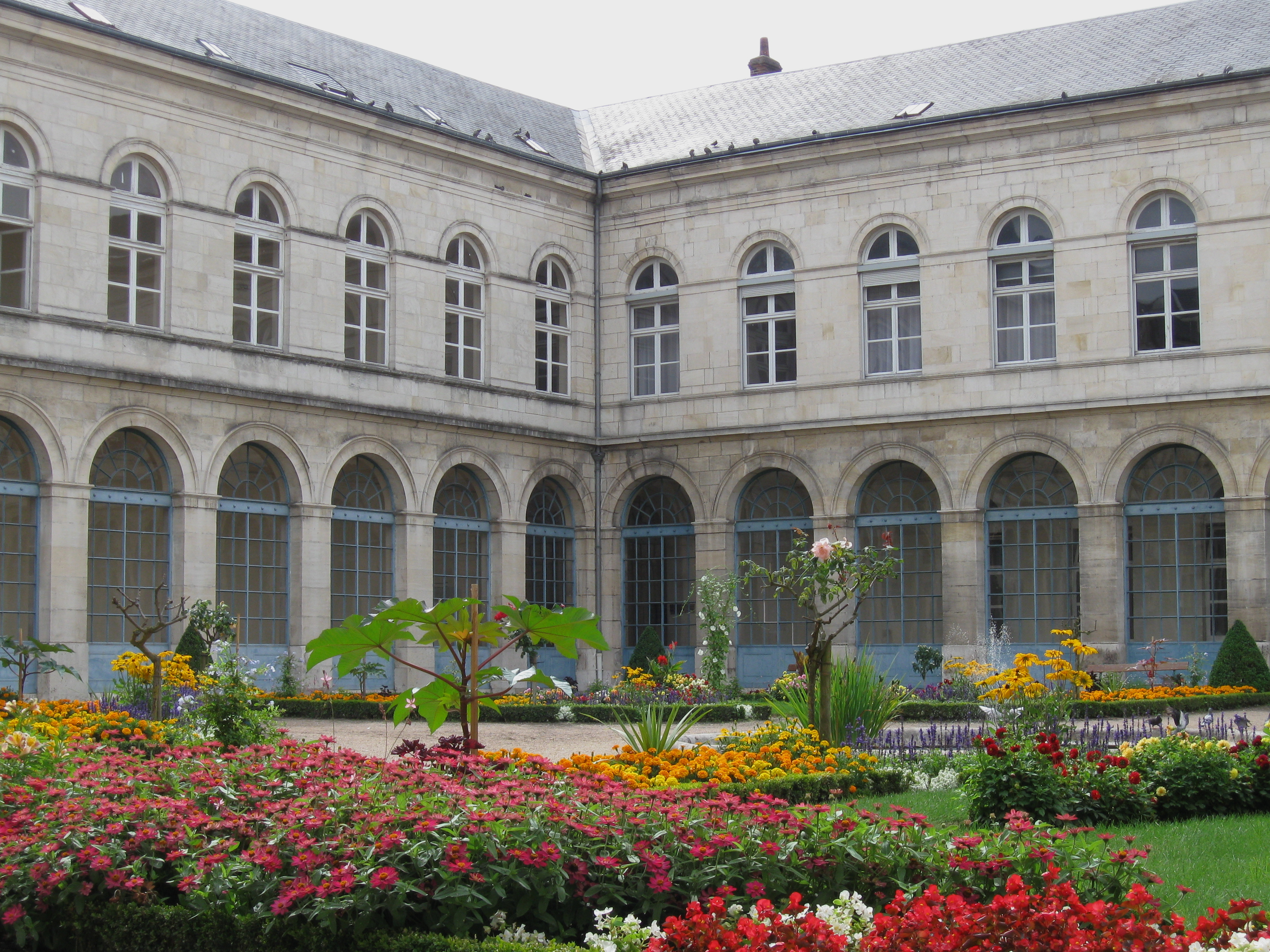
Hospital Madeleine.

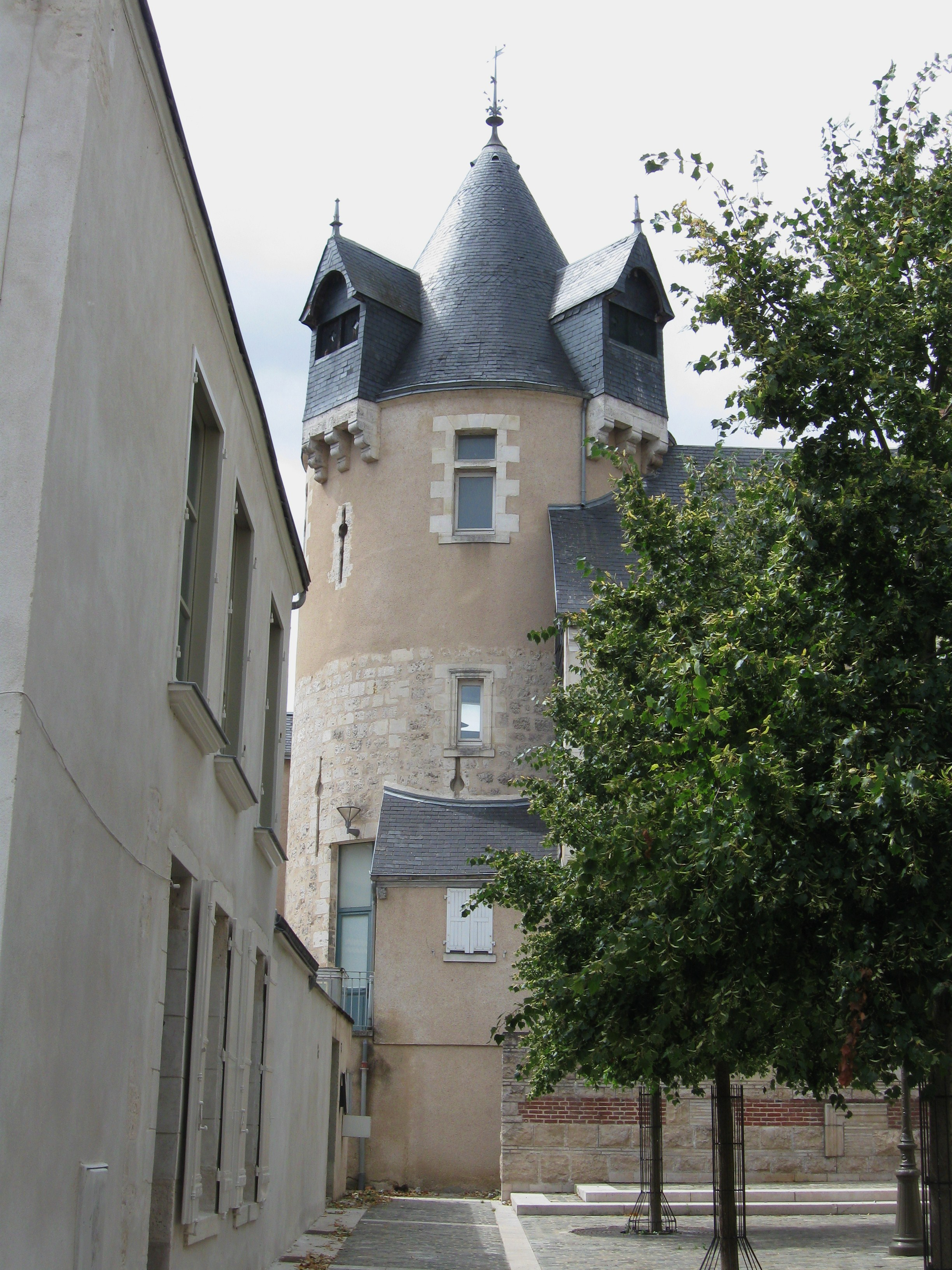
The White Tower.

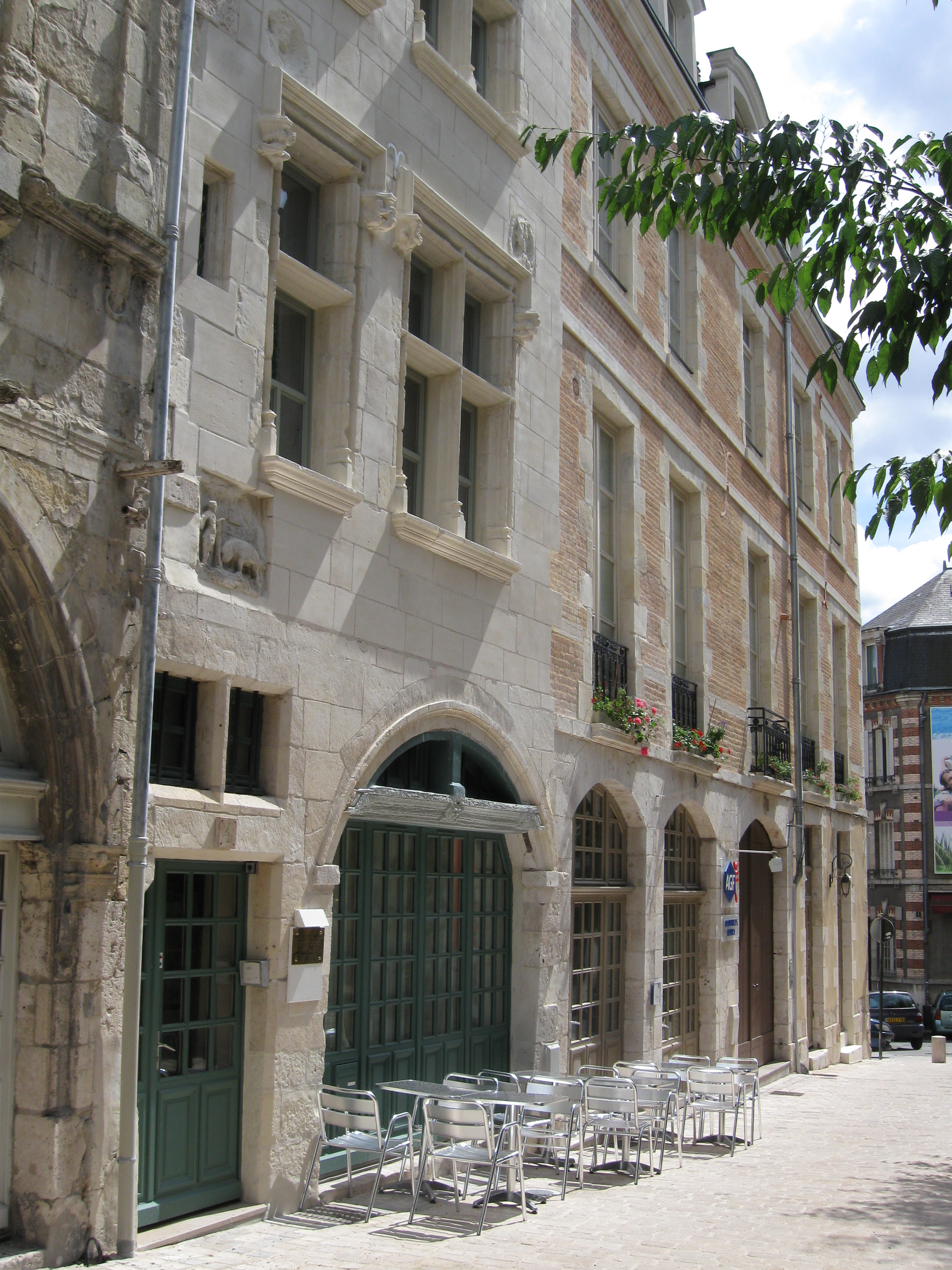
Old town.

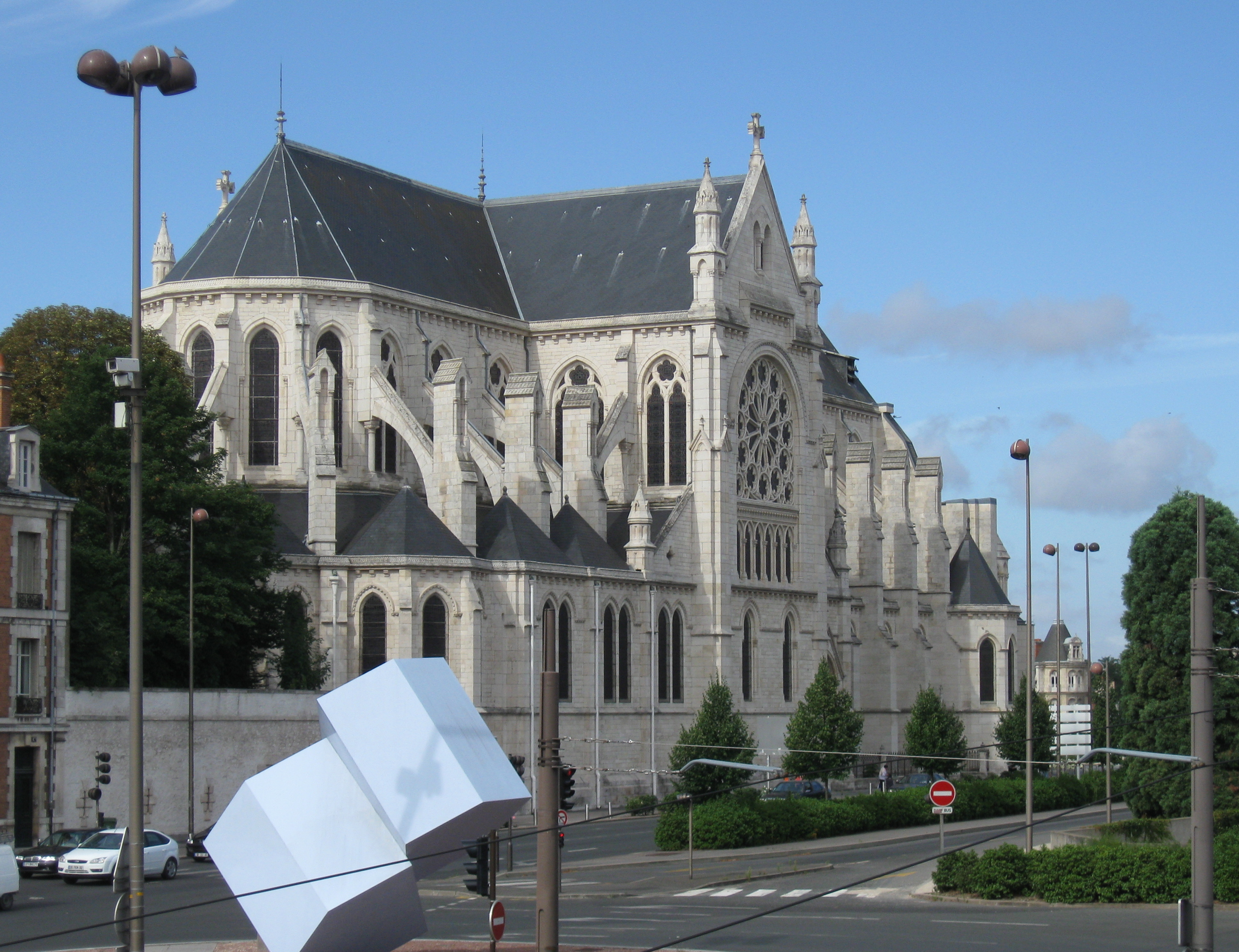
Saint-Paterne.

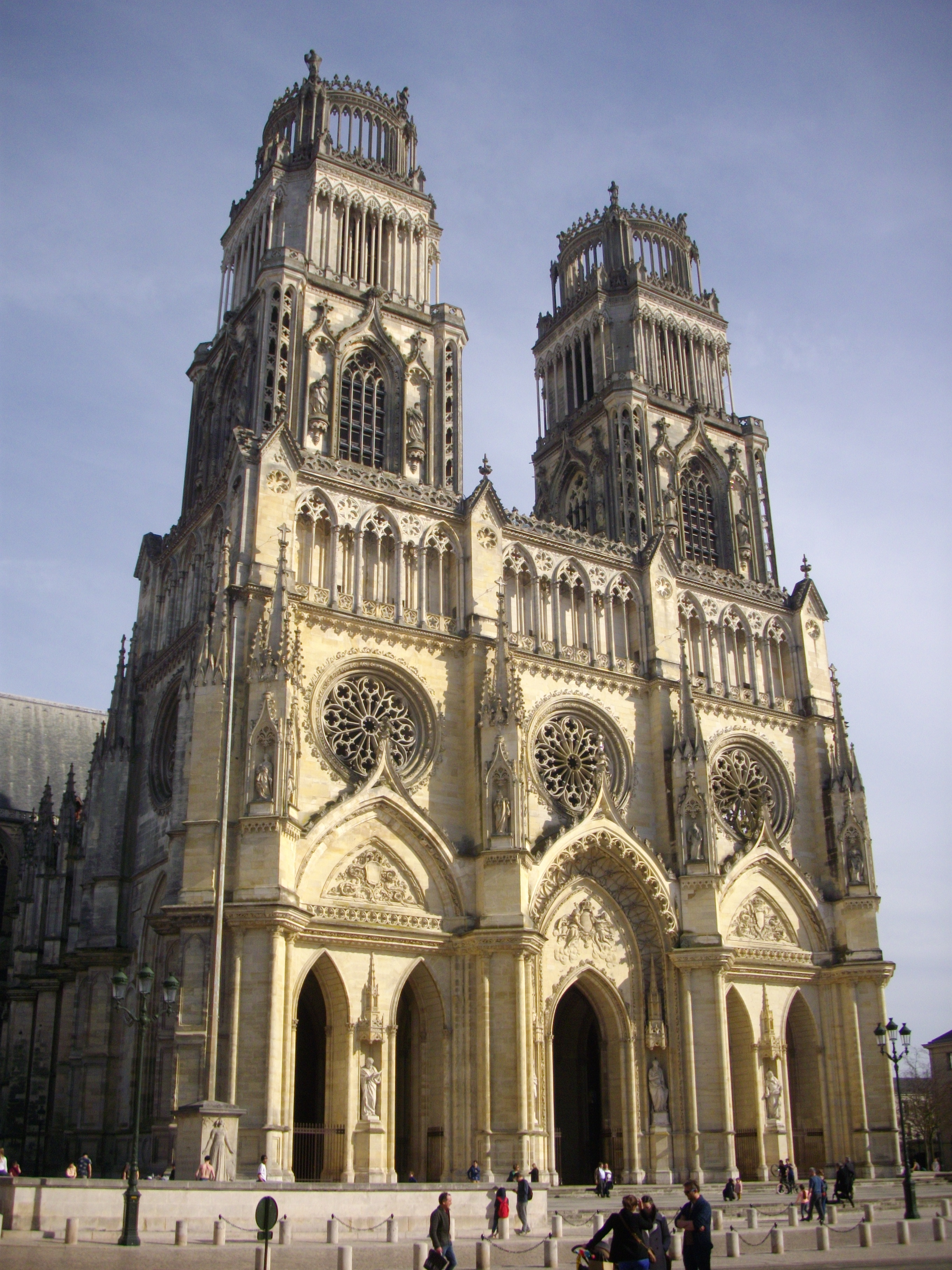
Orléans Cathedral.

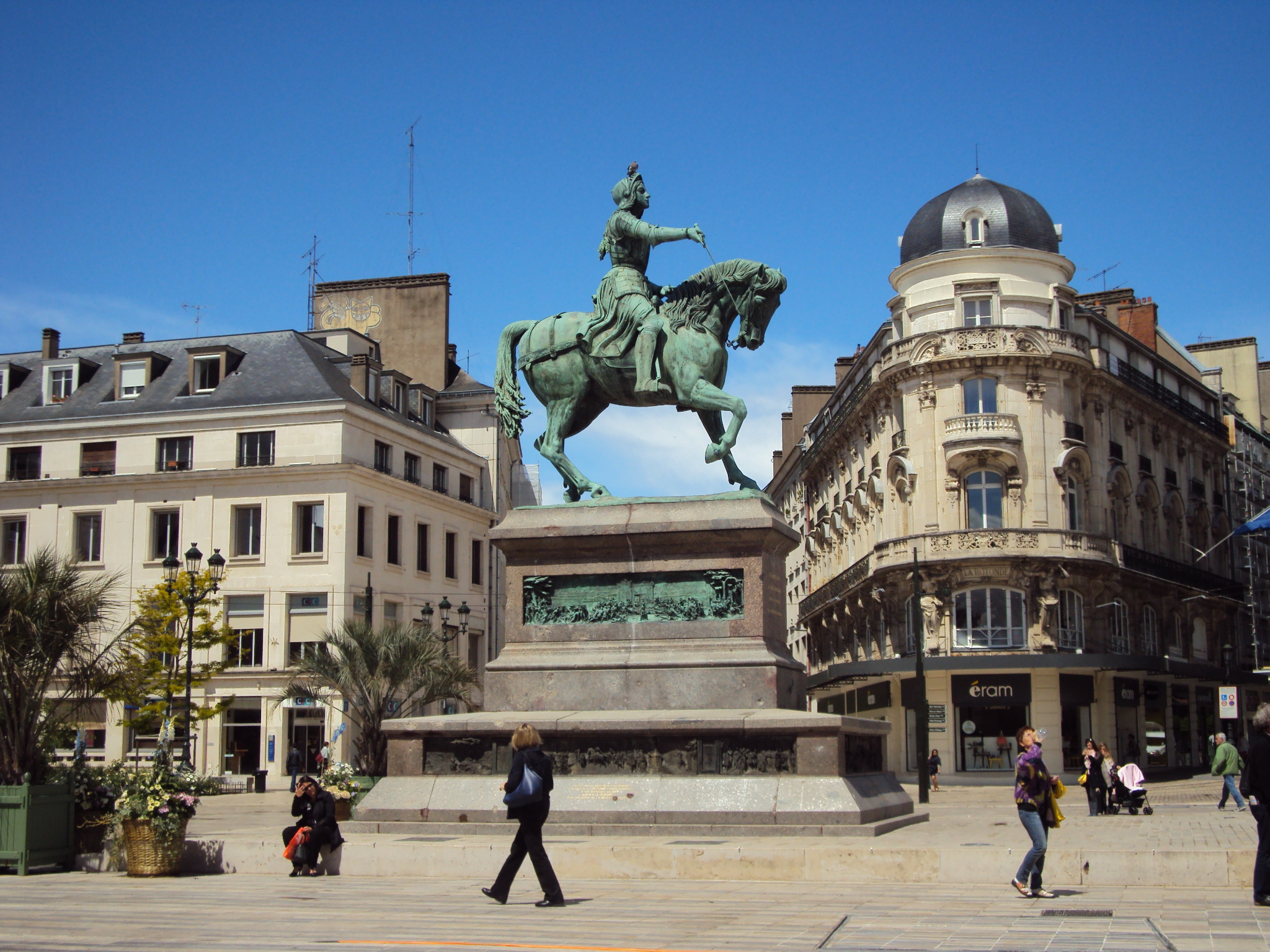
Statue of Joan of Arc.

== See also ==
- Council of Orléans
- House of Orléans
- Orléanist
- Roman Catholic Diocese of Orléans Bishopric of Orléans
- La Source, Orléans
- History of the Loiret
- Port of Orléans
