= Masonry bridge =

Bridge category

A masonry arch bridge, typically designated as a masonry bridge, stone bridge, or vaulted bridge, represents a specific construction technique. However, it is primarily regarded as a prominent category of bridges, employed from antiquity until the early 20th century.

Masonry bridges represent a distinct category of arch bridges, distinguished by their tendency to experience supporting reactions on the abutments that tend to push them apart. The materials used for the arches are cut stones, exhibiting high compression resistance but limited flexion flexibility. In contrast, materials employed in other arch bridge types, including wood, concrete, reinforced concrete, prestressed concrete, metal, and composites, demonstrate some elasticity and can accommodate flexion, enabling the construction of bridges with greater spans.

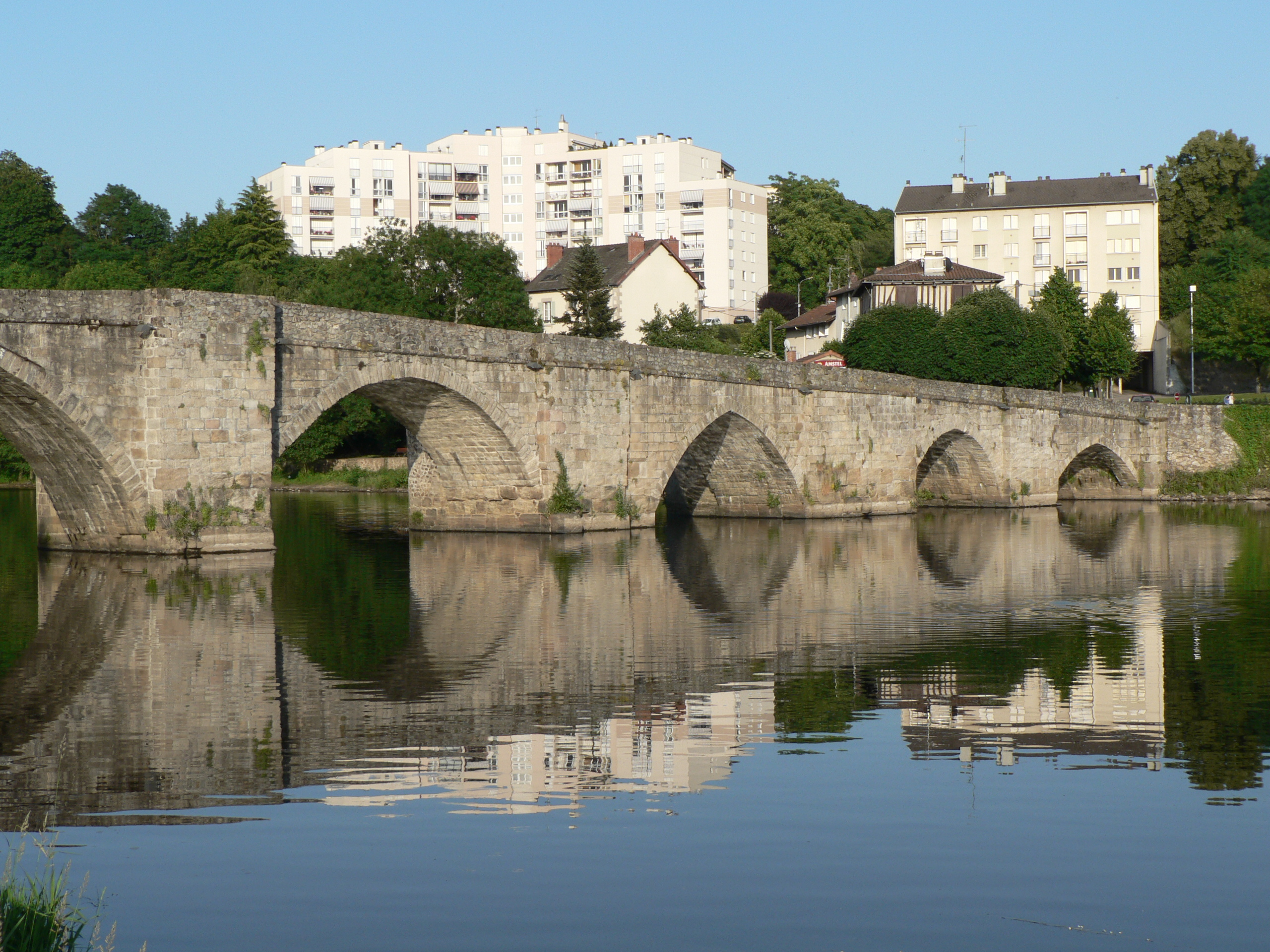
Saint-Martial bridge in Limoges, a medieval bridge with pointed arches.

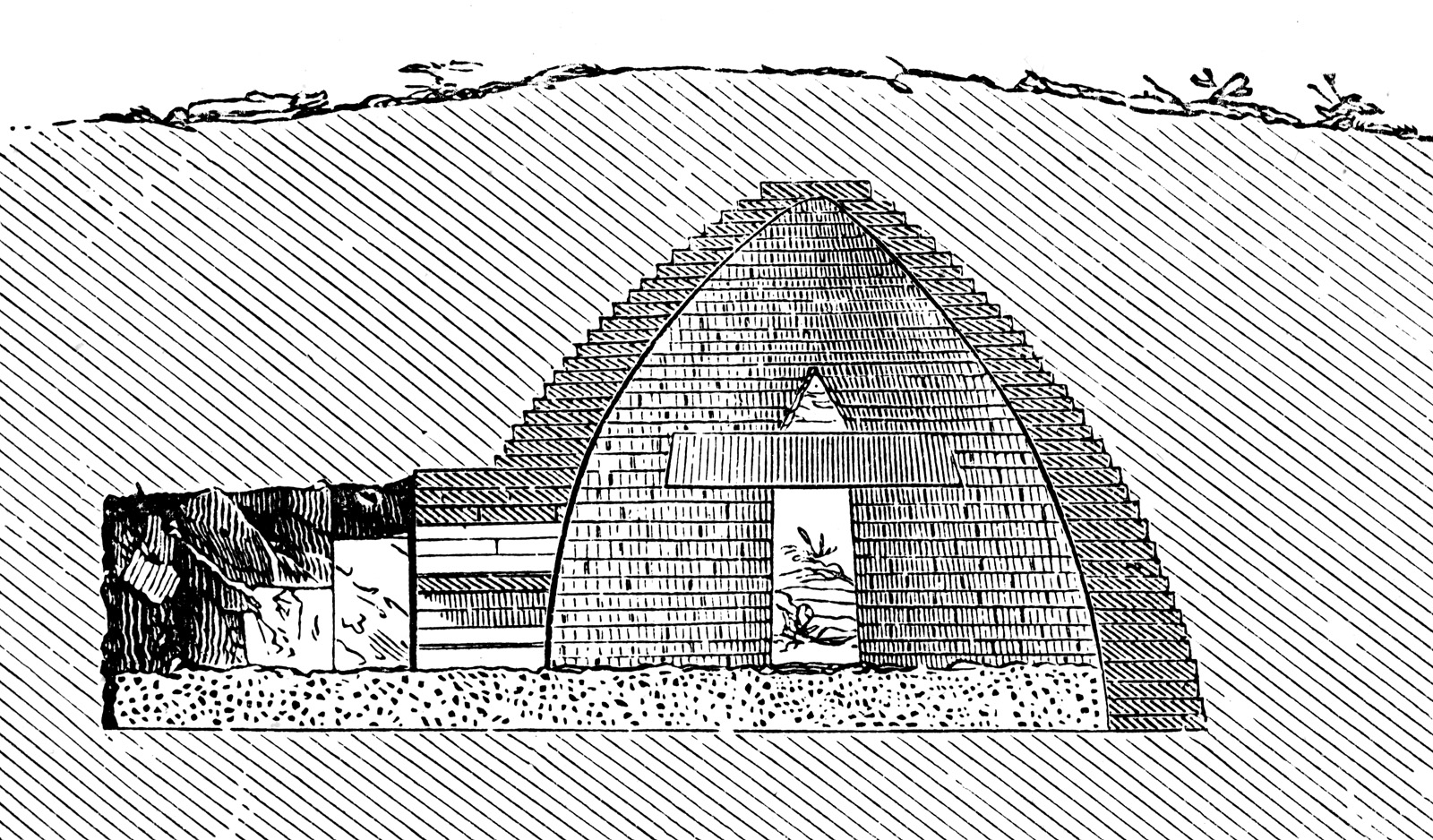
Treasury of Atreus – tomb section.

== History ==
=== The ancient period ===
==== Horizontal stone arches ====
The initial arches were constructed using horizontal stones arranged in an overlapping configuration, a technique referred to as "corbelling." In Abydos, within the palace of Ozymandias, whose reign dates back approximately 2,500 years BCE, a vault of this type was discovered. A similar construction can be observed in Thebes, within the temple of Amun-Ra. Nevertheless, this type's most notable ancient vault is arguably the Treasury of Atreus, an imposing tholos tomb in Mycenae, Greece, constructed circa 1250 BCE. The structure is a semi-subterranean chamber with a circular plan and an ogival section roof. With an interior height of 13.5 meters and a diameter of 14.5 meters, it was the largest and widest dome in the world for over a millennium, until the construction of the Baths of Mercury at Baiae and the Pantheon in Rome.

==== Mycenaean bridges ====
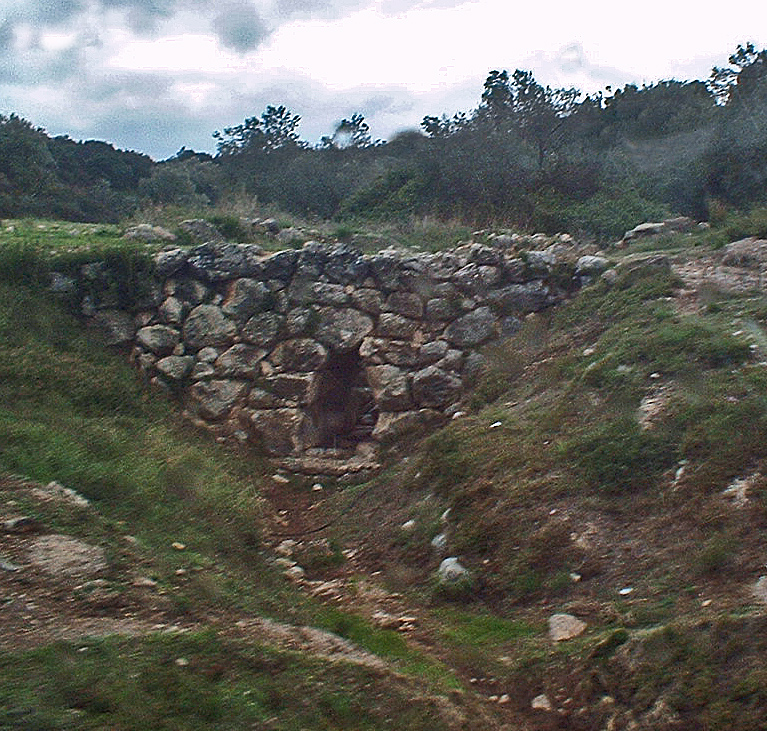
Mycenaean bridge at Kazarma (−1300)

Three bridges remain in Argolis, in the Peloponnese, including the Mycenaean bridge of Kazarma. It was constructed using the corbelling technique, a method characterized by the rough stacking of stones.

These bridges were probably constructed around 1300 BCE, during the Mycenaean period (Bronze Age), specifically during the Helladic IIIb phase (about 1340/1200 BCE). They were erected to facilitate transportation along the route connecting the prominent Mycenaean settlements of Mycenae, Argos, and Tiryns to the port of Palea Epidavros.

==== Converging joint arches ====
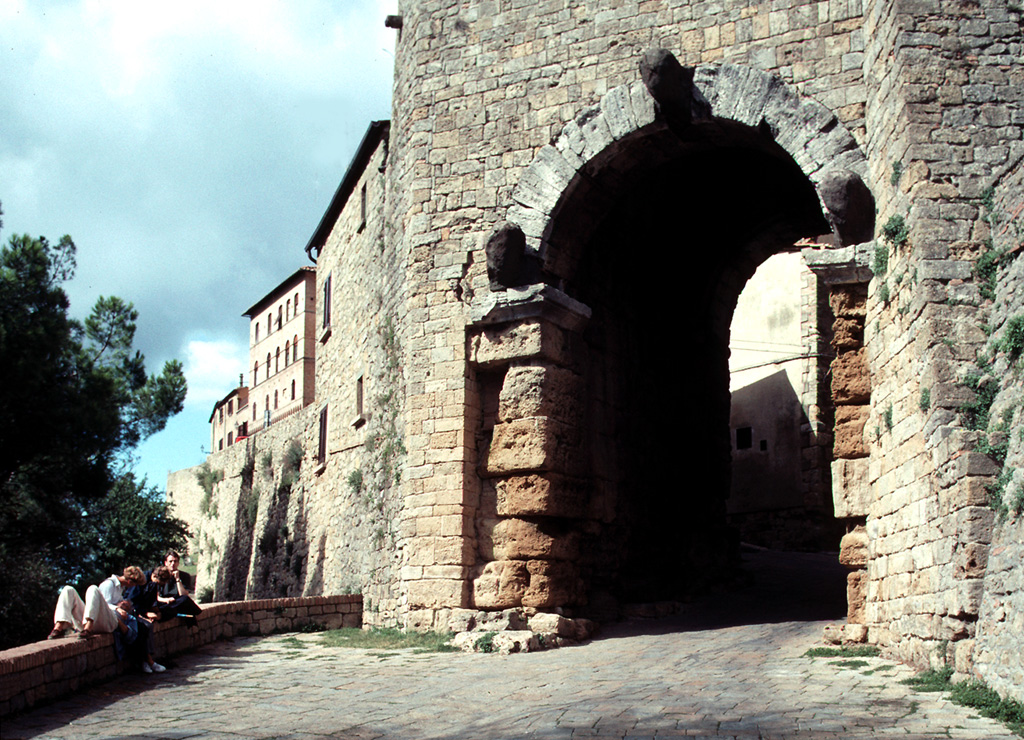
Porta all'Arco in Volterra, Etruscan gateway dating from the 3rd or 2nd century BC.

The use of converging joint arches, which are joints that are perpendicular to the intrados surface, is a characteristic feature of masonry bridges. These arches can already be observed in various monuments of ancient Egypt. In Nubia, one of the pyramids of Meroë contains a true semi-circular arch constructed with regularly arranged voussoirs. At Gebel Barkal, two porticoes leading to pyramids are covered, one by a pointed arch and the other by a semi-circular arch. Both are constructed with voussoirs featuring converging joints. Additionally, an elliptical barrel vault, crafted from bricks, can be observed in the tomb of Amenhotep I. This architectural feature dates back to approximately 1,800 BCE.

In more recent times one may observe the employment of this architectural construction principle of an arch in the Etruscan walls of the city of Volterra, which dates from the 3rd or 2nd century BCE.

=== The Roman period ===
It was the Romans who revived, perfected, and disseminated the arch technique throughout Europe for the construction of bridges. The vast extent of the Roman Empire necessitated the construction of reliable roadways that could be used throughout the year and were constructed with more substantial materials than those used for simple wooden bridges.

==== In Italy ====
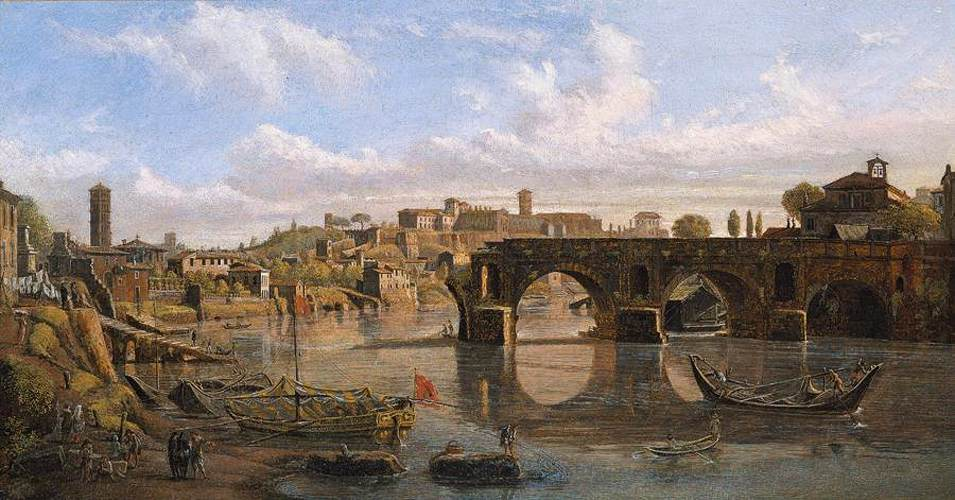
Caspar van Wittel's 1690 depiction of the Æmilius Bridge and the Aventine Hill.

It is widely accepted that the oldest known vaulted Roman structure is the Cloaca Maxima, a sewer constructed under the rule of Tarquinius Priscus around 600 BCE.

Roman bridges are characterized by their robust construction and the use of semi-circular arches, which are arches with a circular arc that rest on thick piers with a width approximately half the span of the arch.

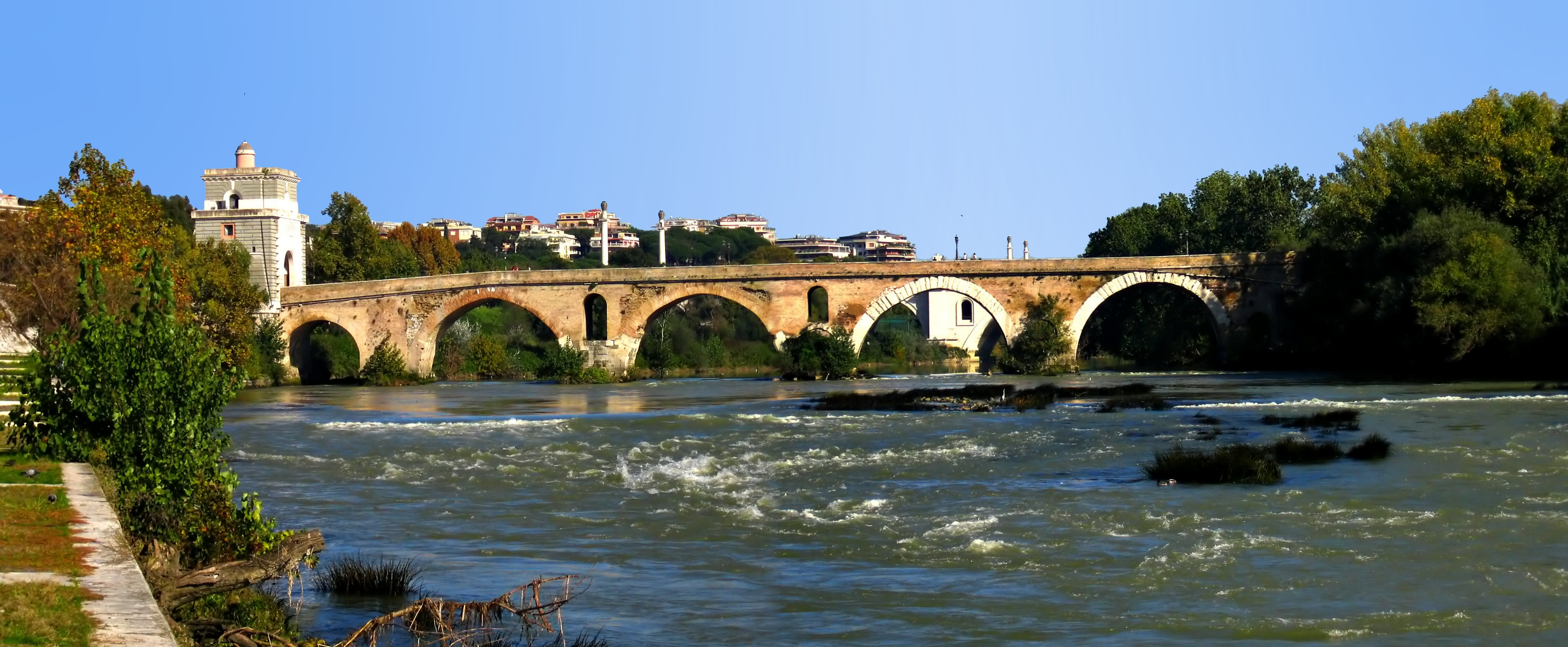
The Milvius bridge over the Tiber in Rome.

The Aemilius Bridge, now designated Ponte Rotto, is the oldest extant stone bridge in Rome. The bridge was constructed by Marcus Aemilius Lepidus in 179 BC and underwent numerous restorations, the most recent of which was conducted by Pope Gregory XIII in 1575. It features semi-circular arches with an opening of 24.40 meters and prominent archivolts, supported by thick piers measuring 8 meters in width. Between these piers, niches rise to the tympanum, flanked by columns with capitals. Currently, only a single arch remains intact.

One of the most ancient structures in Roman roadways is the Milvian Bridge, constructed over the Tiber by the consul Marcus Aemilius Scaurus in 115 BCE. Situated approximately three kilometers from Rome, where the Via Flaminia and the Via Cassia converge to traverse the river, the Milvian Bridge served as the obligatory gateway for those arriving from the north. Given its advantageous location, the Milvian Bridge became a focal point for numerous conflicts. In 312 CE, it was here that Emperor Constantine emerged triumphant over his rival Maxentius in the renowned Battle of the Milvian Bridge.

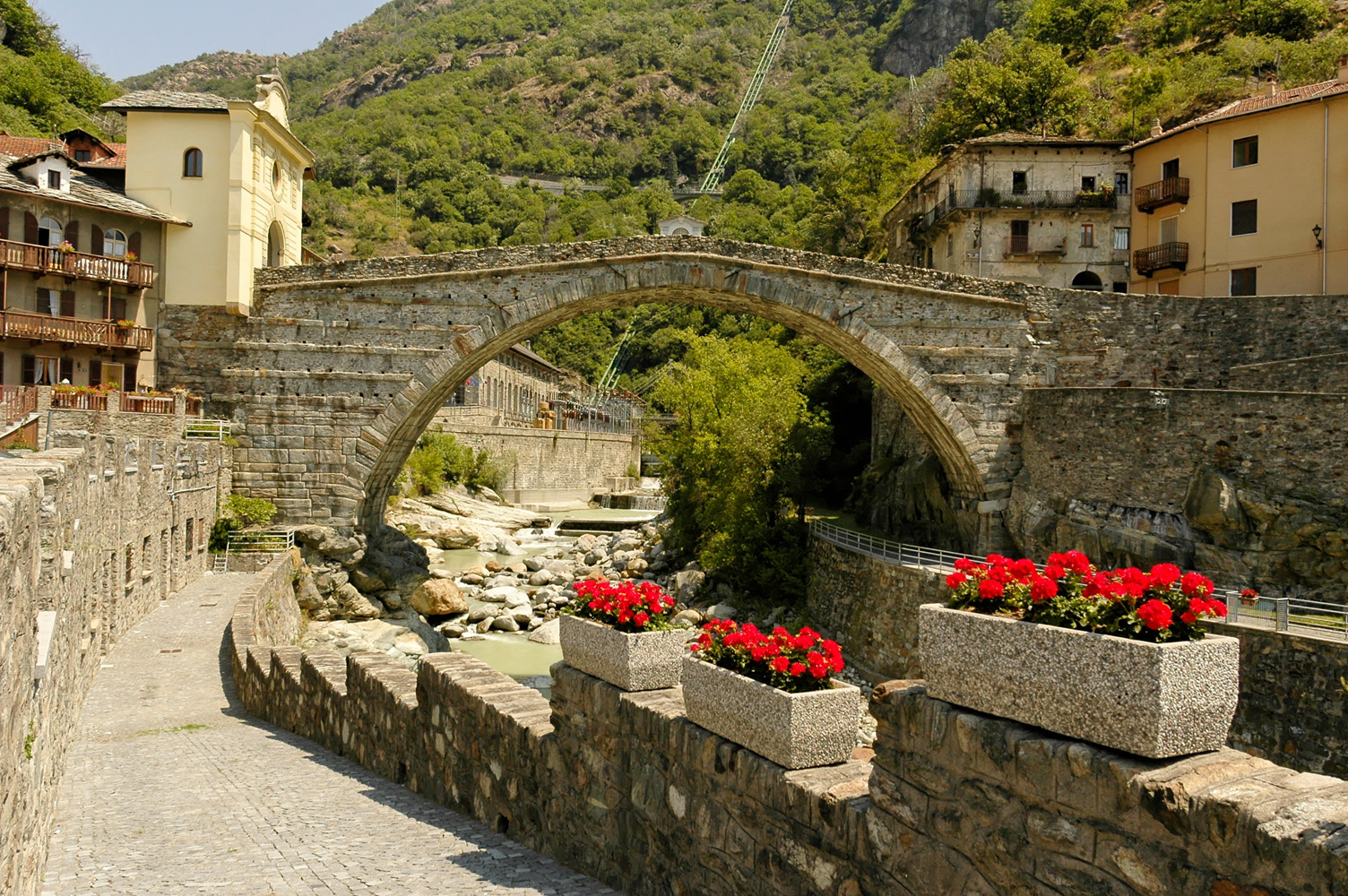
Pont-Saint-Martin Bridge.

A considerable number of bridges were constructed in the Italian provinces, each exhibiting distinctive characteristics. Among these bridges is the Pont-Saint-Martin bridge, constructed over the Lys between 70 and 40 BCE at the entrance to the Aosta Valley. The single arch of the bridge has a span of 31.4 meters and a rise of 11.42 meters, which was unusually flat for the time. The structure features two different masonry techniques: the lower part is made of gneiss blocks, dry-laid, while the upper part is a superposition of layers made of gneiss flakes and lime, interspersed with bands of stone. (Note: Prade 1990, p. 305)

The Fabricius Bridge, constructed in 62 BCE by the road commissioner Lucius Fabricius, is the sole surviving ancient Roman bridge in Rome that has remained in its original state. It spans the Tiber River, connecting Tiber Island to the Campus Martius shore, situated close to the Theater of Marcellus and the Forum Boarium. (Note: Prade 1990, p. 306)

Another ancient Roman bridge is the Saint Angelo Bridge, which connects the two banks of the Tiber opposite the Castel Sant'Angelo. Construction of the bridge commenced in 134 CE under the reign of Emperor Hadrian, who subsequently bestowed upon it the name Pons Aelius. (Note: Prade 1990, p. 307)

==== In the West, outside Italy ====
Sketch of the Limyra bridge in Turkey.

Spain and Portugal are home to some impressive Roman bridges, the majority of which were constructed during the Augustan period. (Note: Prade 1990, p. 193) The Roman bridge of Mérida in Extremadura, comprising 60 arches that traverse the Guadiana River, has a length of 792 meters. (Note: Prade 1990, p. 194) The Alcántara Bridge, constructed over the Tagus between 103 and 104 CE, features six semi-circular arches with openings ranging from 30.8 to 43.6 meters. These arches are supported by piers that are approximately 9 meters thick. Some of the piers are situated in the river itself and rise to a height of approximately 40 meters above their foundations. The bridge's aesthetic appeal is derived from its imposing dimensions, the simplicity of its structural forms, and its solid appearance. (Note: Prade 1990, p. 198)

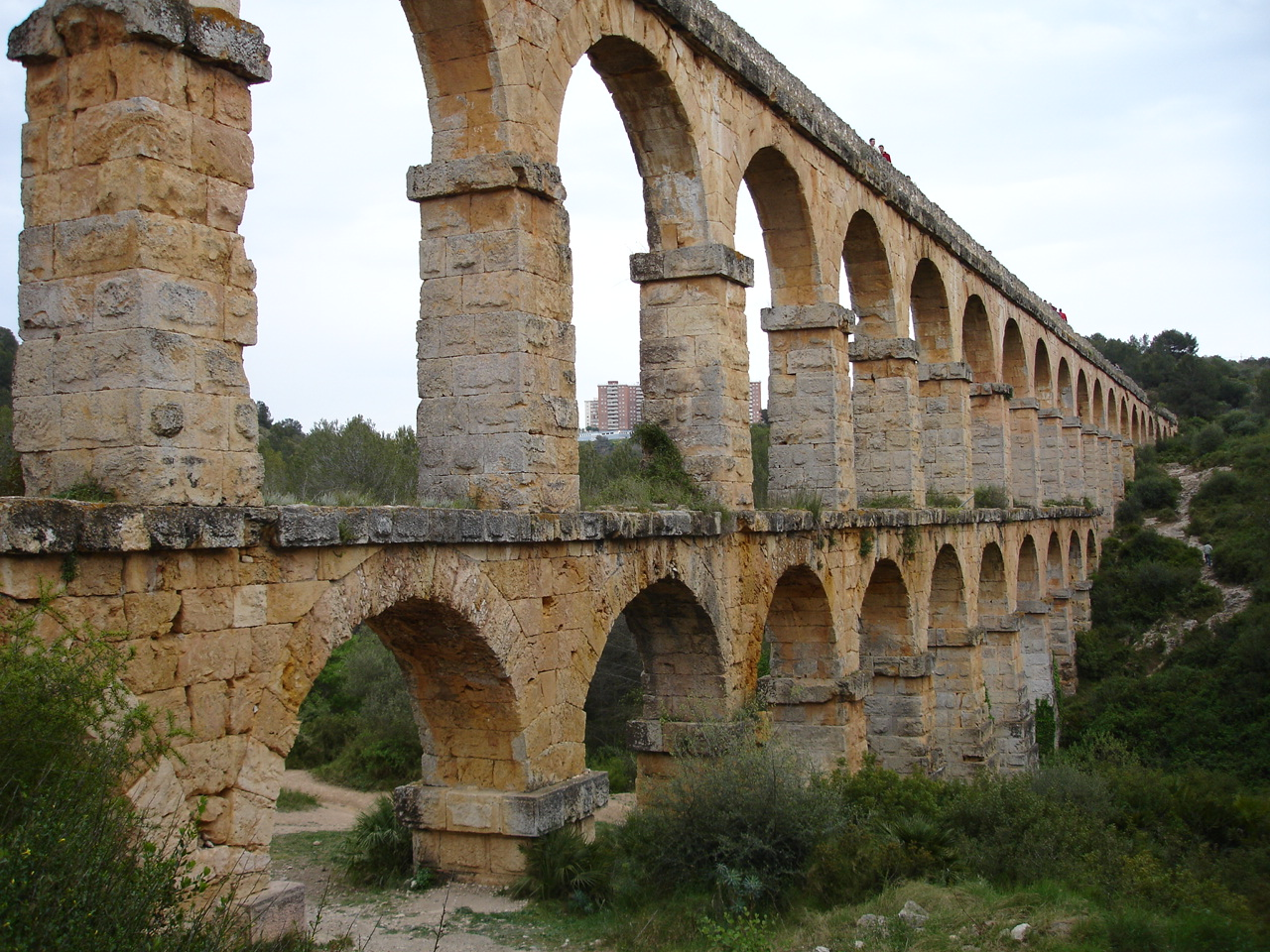
Tarragona aqueduct in Spain.

Two noteworthy aqueduct bridges from this period are the Segovia Aqueduct, constructed between 98 and 117 CE under the direction of Trajan, and the Aqueduct of Tarragona. The Segovia Aqueduct is 813 meters in length and features 128 arches, (Note: Prade 1990, p. 196) while the Aqueduct of Tarragona spans the Francolí Valley and is 217 meters in length.

In the 3rd century, segmental arch bridges, or flat arch bridges, emerged. One of the earliest examples of this type of bridge is the Limyra Bridge, situated near Limyra in present-day Turkey. It is 360 meters in length and comprises 26 segmental arches and two semi-circular arches.

In France, the Pont du Gard is a Roman aqueduct bridge comprising three levels, with a maximum height of 47.40 meters at its highest point. It is situated in the commune of Vers-Pont-du-Gard, in the Gard department. It was probably constructed during the first half of the 1st century, serving to maintain the continuity of the Roman aqueduct that transported water from Uzès to Nîmes, a distance of 50 kilometers. (Note: Prade 1990, p. 179)

==== In the East ====
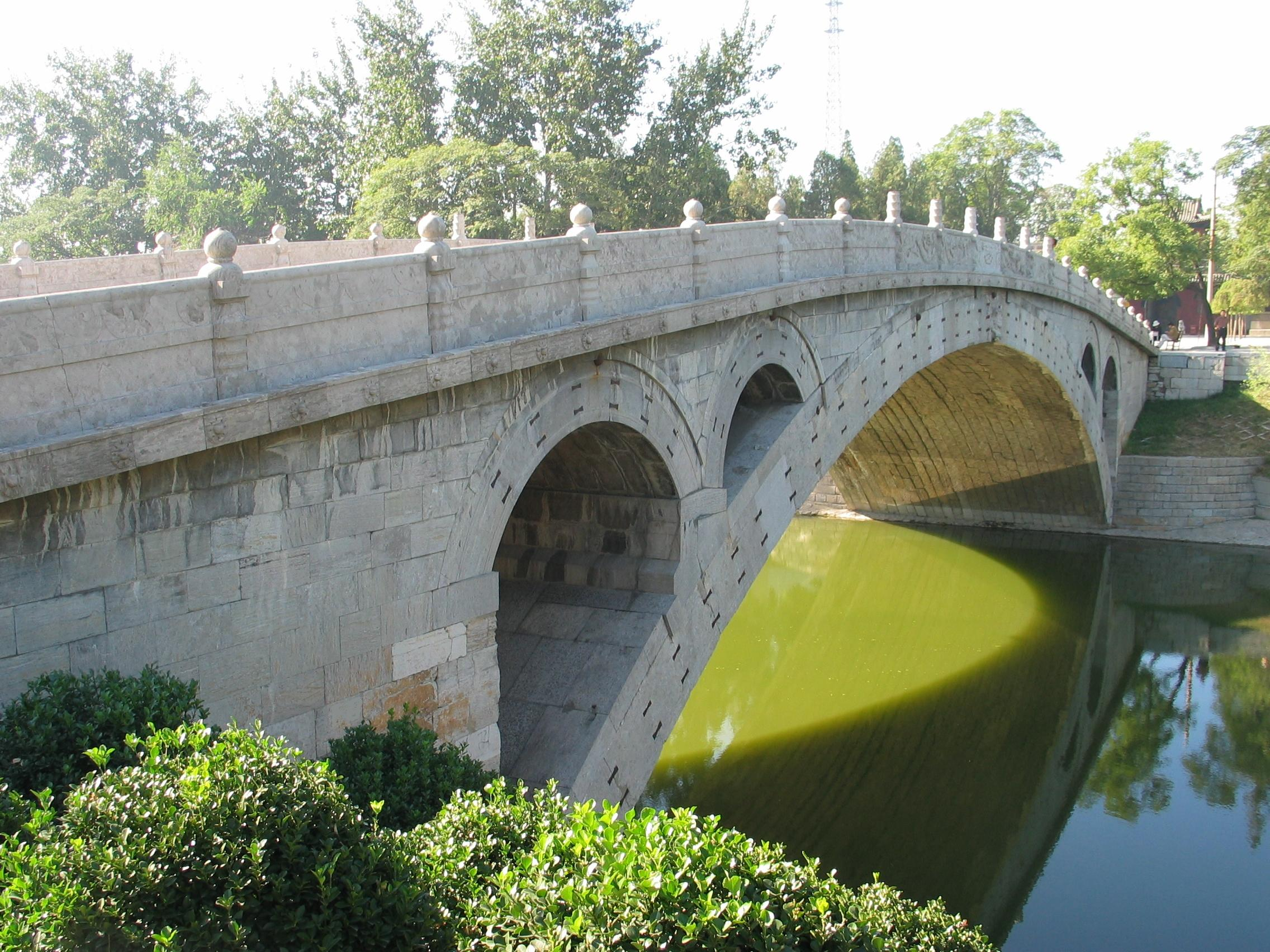
The Zhaozhou bridge, built around 605.

It is almost certain that the Chinese independently invented the arch, either before or after the Greeks, and that they constructed vaulted bridges at an early date, possibly even before the Romans. (Note: Prade 1990a, p. 217) According to Chinese archaeologists, the oldest bridge is the Lurenqiao Bridge, constructed around 282 BCE near the ancient palace of Luoyang (Henan province).

The Zhaozhou Bridge, which bears a resemblance to 19th-century Western bridges, was constructed around 605 CE. It is the oldest segmental arch bridge with an open spandrel in the world and the oldest bridge in China still in use. It is situated in the Zhao District of the prefecture-level city of Shijiazhuang in Hebei. The span of its arch measures 37.4 meters.

Another noteworthy ancient bridge is the Baodai Bridge, constructed over the Grand Canal in Suzhou by Wang Zhongshu, governor of Suzhou during the Tang dynasty (618–907 CE). It is 317 meters in length and comprises 53 arches, making it the Chinese bridge with the greatest number of arches.

=== The Medieval period ===
==== In the West ====
Following the decline of the Roman Empire, a period of approximately five centuries, or half of the millennium, was characterized by the dominance of the Middle Ages. During this era, which saw the rise of the Church and the development of feudalism, there was a paucity of significant artistic and architectural works. The construction of bridges, in particular, was largely confined to wooden structures.

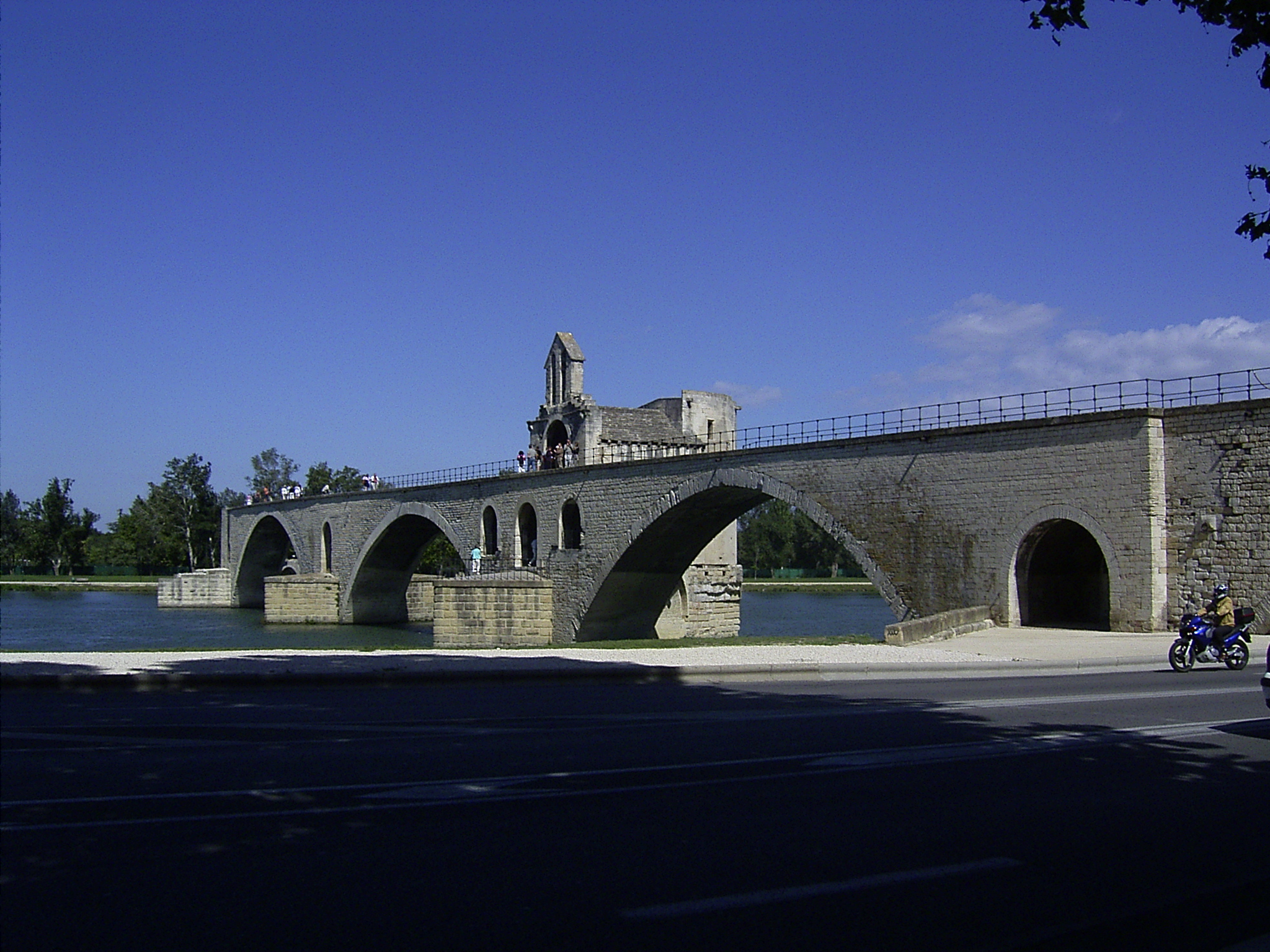
Avignon bridge over the Rhône, with pointed arches.

From the 11th century onwards, a plethora of bridges of varying shapes were constructed. These structures frequently comprised arches of varying degrees of unevenness, with vaults in slightly flattened curves, semicircular arches, or pointed arches, the latter of which diminished pressure on the structure. They were supported by thick piers with protruding ends, at least upstream. The distances between walls were narrow, and the passages were marked by steep ramps and slopes.

In France several noteworthy medieval bridges can be found, including the Pont Saint-Bénézet in Avignon on the Rhône (1177–1187), the historic bridge in Carcassonne on the Aude (1180). Additionally, the Petit-Pont in Paris on the Seine (1186), the Pont Valentré in Cahors on the Lot (1231), and the Pont Saint-Martial in Limoges on the Vienne (1215) are noteworthy examples.

The Middle Ages saw the construction of numerous wooden bridges, many of which were topped with structures that served as shops, thereby creating what are known as inhabited bridges. One of the most renowned examples is the Ponte Vecchio on the Arno River in Florence, Italy. Originally constructed from wood, it was subsequently rebuilt in stone in 1345 by either Taddeo Gaddi or Neri di Fioravante, depending on the source. However, it was not until the 16th century that the renowned gallery above the shops was constructed. (Note: Prade 1990, p. 312)

==== In the East ====
The Marco Polo Bridge is likely the earliest Chinese bridge known in the West, as documented by the Venetian traveler Marco Polo during his 13th-century journey to China. It is situated 15 km outside of Beijing and was constructed in 1192. The bridge is 8 meters wide and 205 meters long, comprising 11 arches of varying sizes, with the largest spanning 21.60 meters. (Note: Prade 1990a, p. 218)

The Chinese arch bridge reached its apogee in Fujian, where it was constructed with extremely thin arches. The Xiao Bridge, constructed in 1470, has a free height of 7.2 meters with an arch thickness of only 20 centimeters, which is half the thickness of a typical arch. It remains in use today, supporting contemporary traffic. Another noteworthy bridge from this period is the Gao-po Bridge, situated in Yongding and constructed in 1477. It has a span of 20 meters and an arch just 60 cm thick and was built without any bonding mortar.

In Cambodia, the Phra Phutthos bridge was constructed at the end of the 12th century during the reign of Jayavarman VII. It features over 20 slender arches and is 75 meters long, making it the longest stone corbel arch bridge in the world.

=== From the Renaissance to the end of the 17th century ===
==== In the West ====
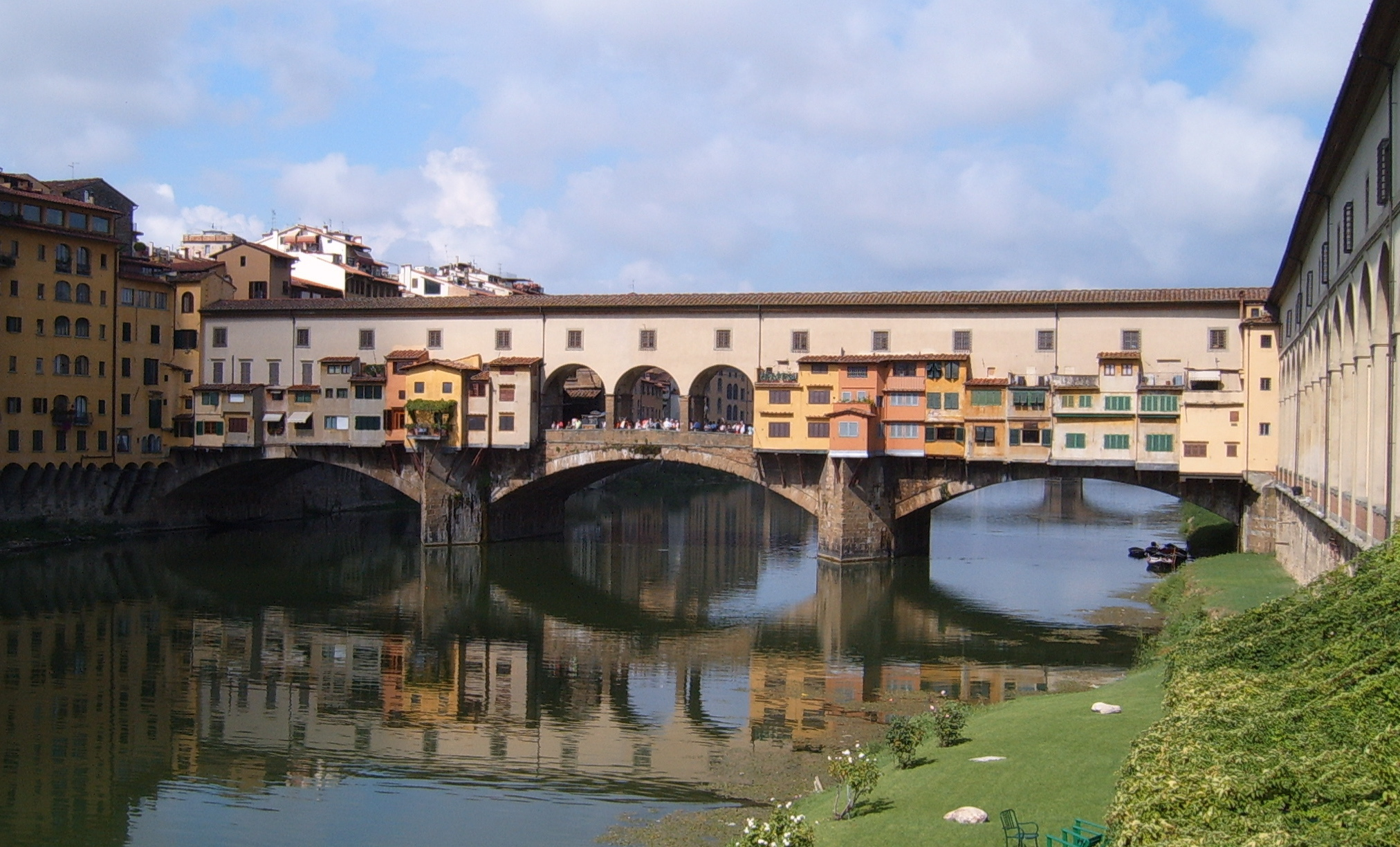
Ponte Vecchio between Oltrarno and Lungarno.

In the West, between the 15th and 16th centuries, the architects of the renowned bridges in Florence, Venice, and other Italian cities drew inspiration from the regular forms of the past. However, their inclination to perceive themselves primarily as artists, rather than builders, occasionally resulted in the excessive incorporation of superstructures and decorations. Two of the most illustrative examples are the Ponte Vecchio in Florence and the Rialto Bridge on the Grand Canal in Venice.

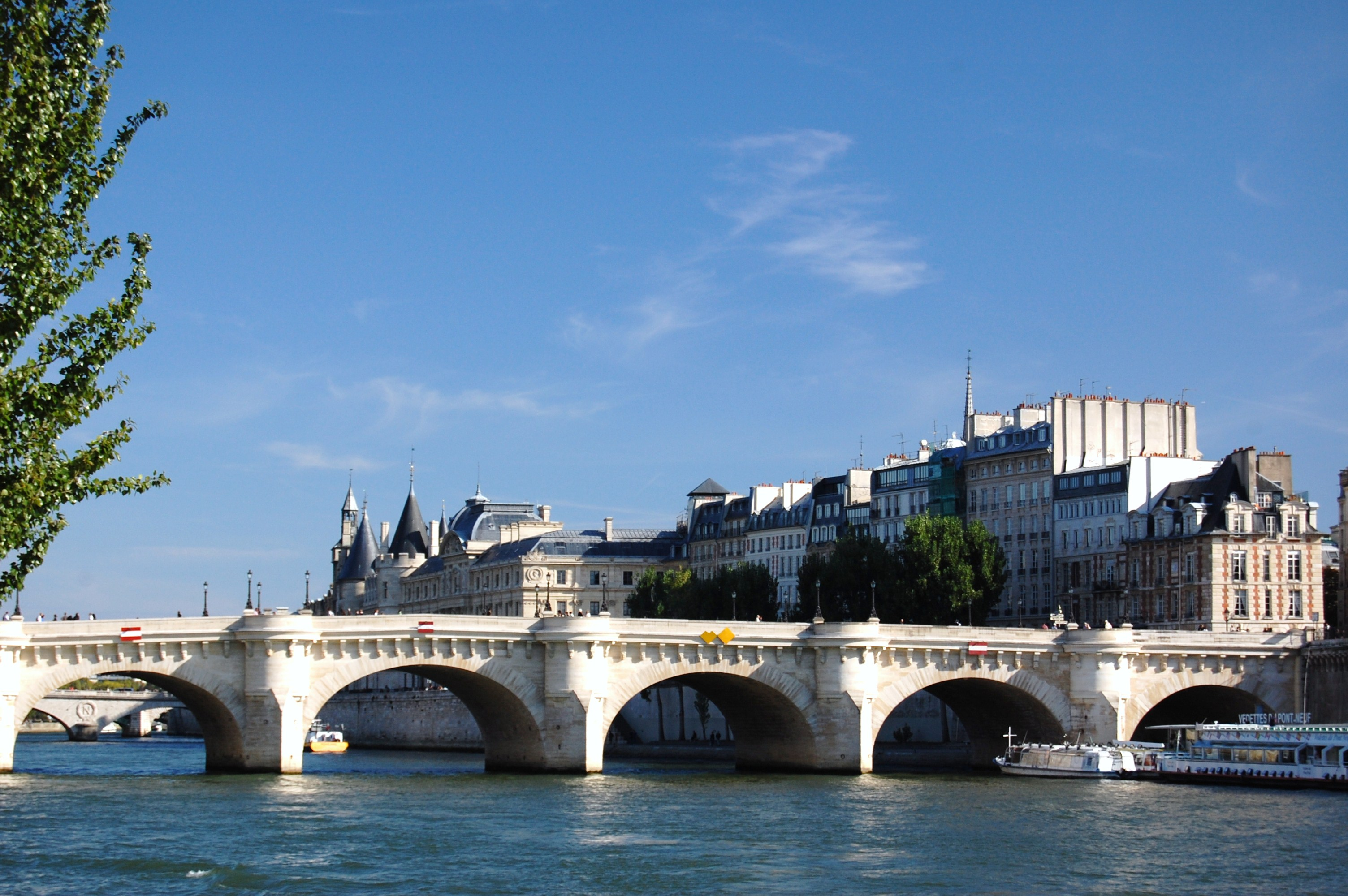
Pont Neuf: the oldest bridge in Paris.

Bridges became a pivotal component in the implementation of extensive urban planning initiatives. In France, the first renowned architects emerged, including Androuet du Cerceau, who designed the Pont Neuf in Paris. Despite the commencement of construction in 1578, the project was not concluded until 1604, largely due to the ongoing conflicts of the Wars of Religion. The bridge facilitated passage between the Louvre Palace and the Abbey of Saint-Germain-des-Prés, which was situated adjacent to the monument erected in honor of Henri IV on the downstream point of the Île de la Cité. It is the oldest bridge that is still in use in Paris. During this period, the basket-handle arch, which is a curve with three or more centers, was introduced, although it never completely replaced the semicircular curve.

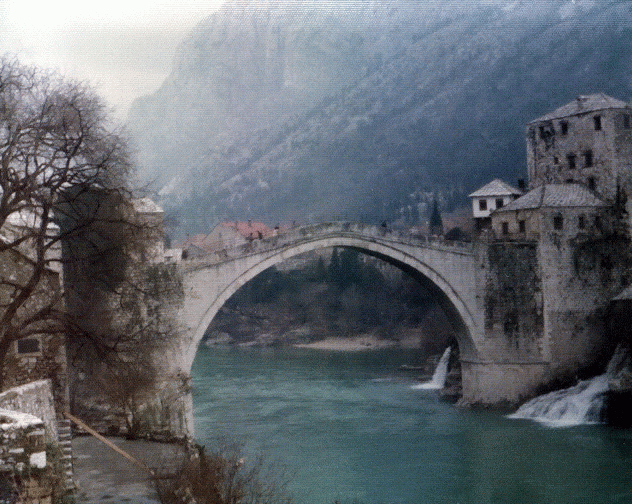
Stari Most in the 1970s.

In Central Europe, the Stari Most in Mostar was constructed in 1565 by the architect Mimar Hajrudin, a disciple of the Ottoman architect Sinan. The bridge connects the two parts of the city of Mostar, spanning the Neretva River. It consists of a single humpbacked arch with a 27-meter span, 4 meters in width, and 30 meters in length. The bridge was constructed using advanced architectural techniques and materials, enabling it to withstand centuries of conflict, except for the most recent one.

==== In the East ====
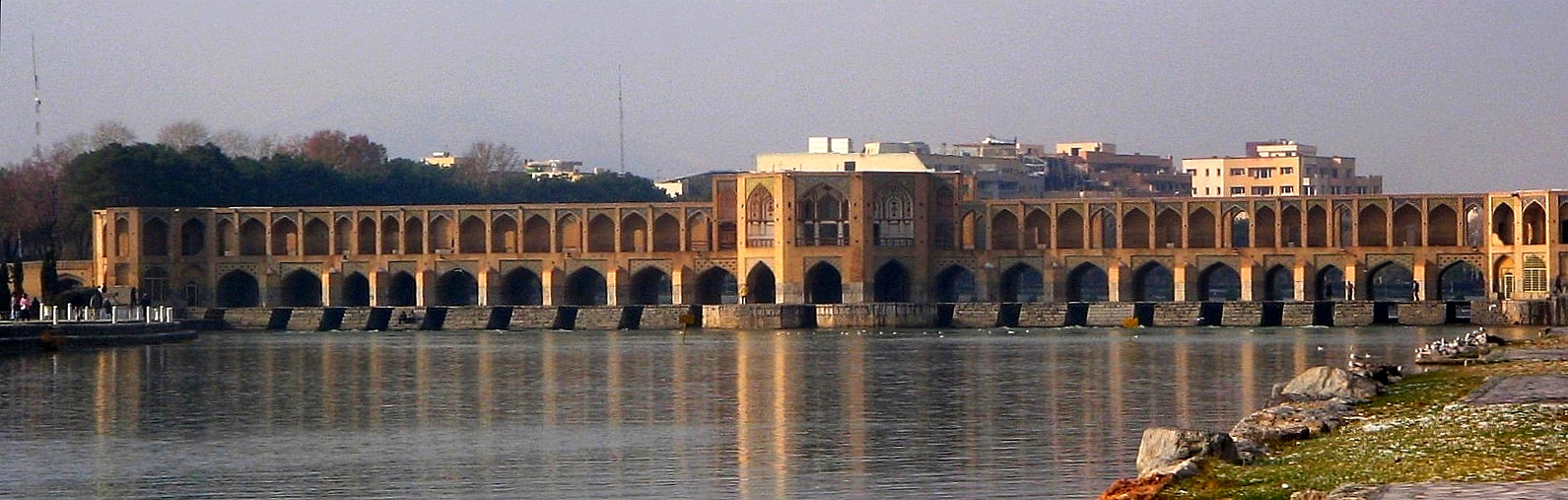
Khaju Bridge in Isfahan.

The Khaju Bridge in Isfahan, Iran, constructed circa 1667, is a noteworthy structure comprising 18 pointed arches. It supports a 26-meter-wide roadway with shaded corridors and is flanked by pavilions and guard towers. The bridge exemplifies a harmonious integration of architectural design and engineering principles, showcasing a functional elegance. Additionally, it served as a dam.

=== 18th century ===
==== The problem of masonry vault stability ====
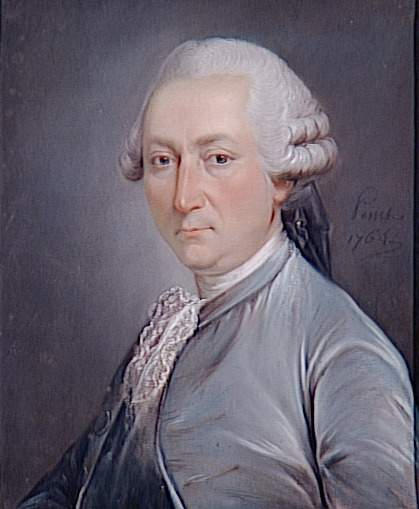
In 1777, Jean-Rodolphe Perronet was the first to calculate the thickness of vaults at the key and in feet.

Until the 17th century, bridges were constructed using established techniques not based on any theoretical approach. Common formulas were derived from observation and practice, with thicknesses at specific points, such as the crown, haunches, piers, or abutments, being determined based on the span of the bridge.

In 1695 and again in 1712, Philippe de La Hire endeavored to conduct the inaugural theoretical calculation of vaults. His methodology entailed a posteriori verification of the stability of the designed vault and the resilience of the materials under load. Despite the absence of tangible practical outcomes, he elucidated two concepts that would prove instrumental a century later:

- The curve of pressures: This is the envelope of the resultant forces acting on any joint of the vault.
- Rupture by blocks: The vault is assumed to break into three independent blocks that separate by sliding, with friction assumed to be negligible. These hypotheses, although incorrect, allowed for an approximation of abutment calculations.

In 1777, Jean-Rodolphe Perronet, the inaugural director of the National School of Bridges and Roads and a distinguished builder, established the initial guidelines for calculating the thickness of vaults and piers. Couplet introduced the concept of pressure center lines and the idea of block rupture by rotation. Coulomb's work, published in 1773, introduced a sliding failure mechanism along a joint and revisited the block rotation mechanism 43 years later. However, these theories would only find concrete applications in the 19th century.

==== Development in the West ====
While medieval bridges had previously been sufficient, the narrow, often-repaired structures with cramped roadways were no longer adequate for the demands of growing commercial exchanges. Consequently, there was a surge in bridge construction in Europe during the 18th century, particularly in France.

During this period, there was a notable evolution in the design of bridges. In the first half of the century, bridges were characterized by steeply arched structures with decreasing arches from the center towards the banks, as exemplified by the Jacques-Gabriel Bridge in Blois. After 1750, there was a shift towards less steep slopes and the use of arches of equal length, as observed in the Wilson Bridge in Tours.

The central region of France (Seine and Loire basins) was particularly favored. It saw the construction of, among others, the Royal Bridge in Paris, which, although built from 1685 to 1687 by Jules Hardouin-Mansart, foreshadows, through its structure, the great bridges of the following century; the Pont de Blois, built from 1716 to 1724 by Jacques Gabriel and Robert Pitrou; the Orléans Bridge, from 1751 to 1760 by Jean Hupeau and Robert Soyer; the Pont de Moulins, from 1756 to 1770 by Louis de Règemorte; the Pont de Saumur, from 1756 to 1768 by Jean-Baptiste de Voglie; the Pont de Neuilly, from 1766 to 1769; and the Pont de la Concorde in Paris, from 1787 to 1791, masterpieces by Perronet.

In Spain, the Toledo Bridge, constructed between 1720 and 1732, is also a monumental work adorned with numerous Baroque sculptures, which contribute to its status as a notable architectural landmark. (Note: Prade 1990, p. 205)

==== In the East ====
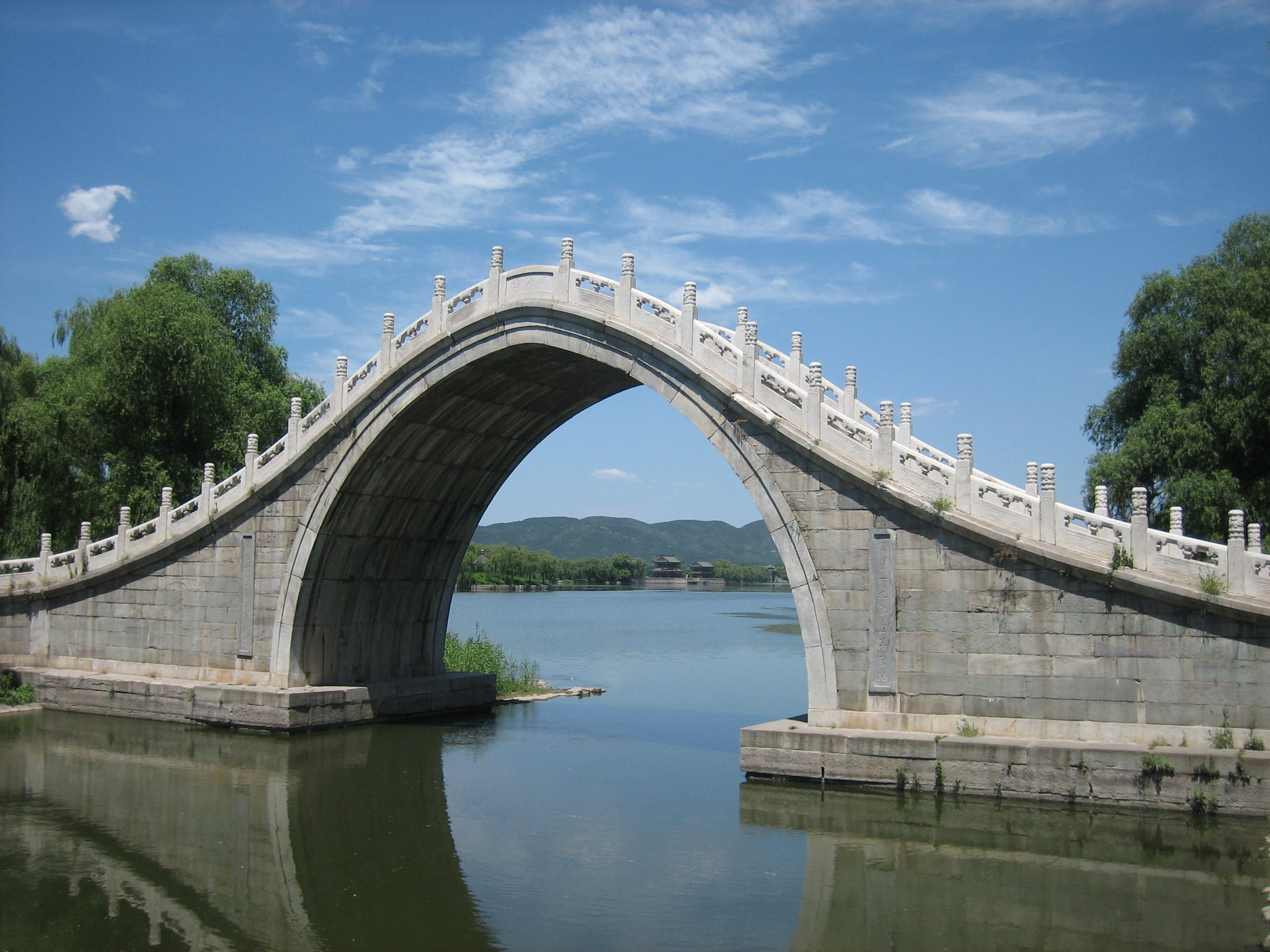
Jade Belt Bridge, a moon bridge.

The extant literature on bridges constructed in the East during the 18th century is, with few exceptions, almost absent. The most celebrated bridges of this era are, without question, those situated within Beijing's Summer Palace. This palace, which dates back to 1155, comprises a disparate array of structures dispersed across a 240-hectare lake, Kunming Lake, accessible via numerous masonry bridges. Among these, two stand out. (Note: Prade 1990a, p. 220)

The Jade Belt Bridge is the most renowned of the six bridges situated on the western shore of Kunming Lake. It was constructed between 1751 and 1764 during the reign of Emperor Qianlong and was built in the distinctive style of the East, which is also evident in Japan with the construction of moon bridges. (Note: Prade 1990a, p. 221)

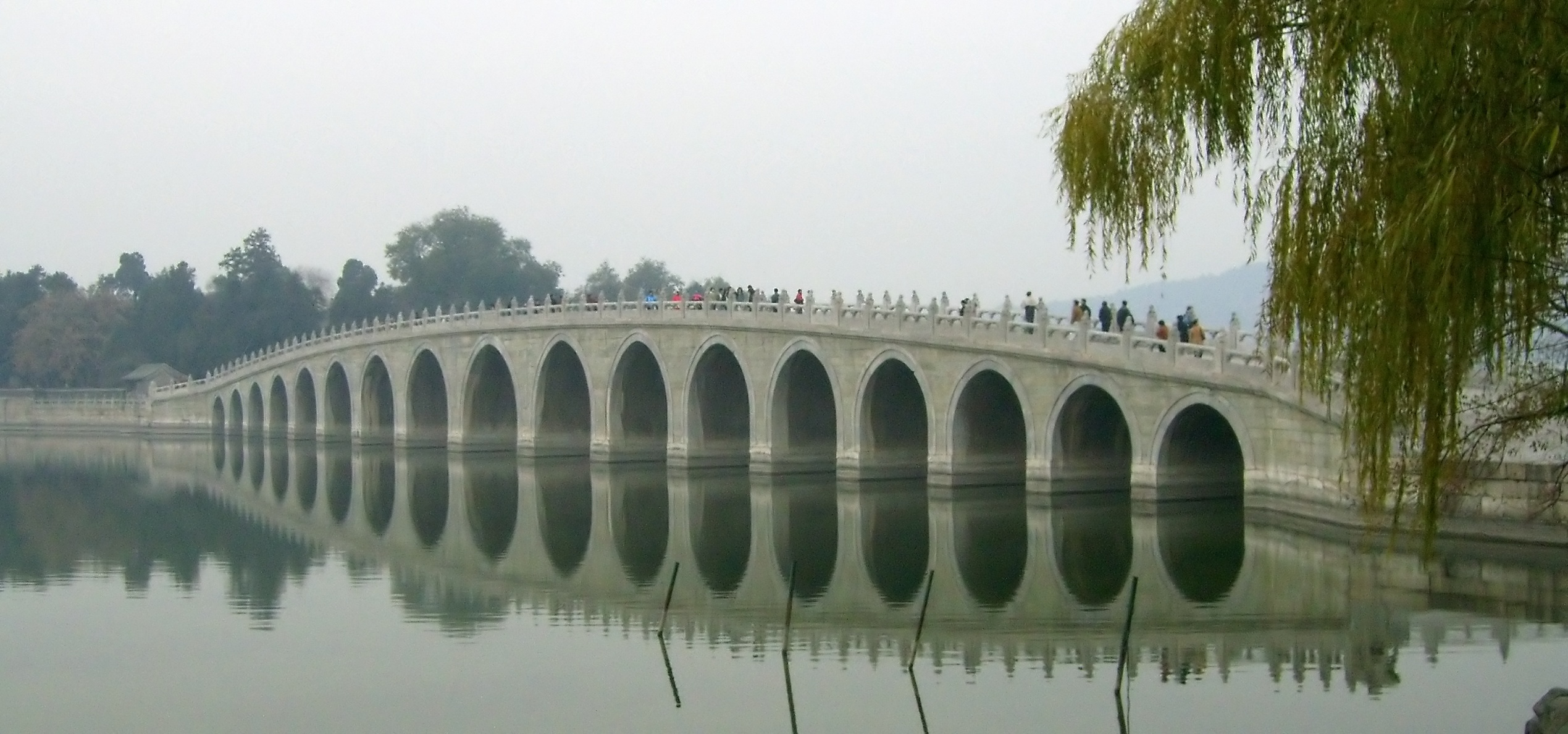
Bridge with seventeen arches.

The Seventeen-Arch Bridge, constructed during the reign of Emperor Qianlong, connects Nanhu Island to the eastern shore of the lake. With a length of 150 meters and a width of 8 meters, it is the longest bridge in the Summer Palace.

=== 19th century ===
==== Improvement of theoretical knowledge ====
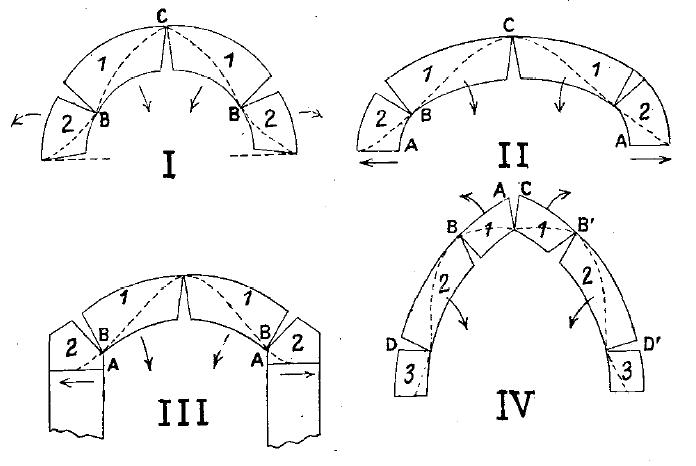
Four-block breakage of vaults: semi-circular, elliptical or basket-handle vaults (I) – very low vaults (II) – arched vaults (III) – ogival or raised vaults (IV), after Jules Pillet (1895)

At the beginning of the 19th century, architects and engineers had amassed considerable practical experience in the construction of stone and wooden bridges. In 1810, Louis-Charles Boistard demonstrated, following a series of experiments, that the failure of vaults was caused by the rotation of four blocks. In his lectures at the School of Bridges and Roads (1825), Navier introduced the concept of material elasticity and defined the "central third rule", which establishes a limit within which the pressure center line of the vault must remain.

These results allowed Édouard Mery to publish in 1840 a method for verifying vaults that were used throughout the 19th century and are still occasionally used today. "Mery's diagram" is based on the principle that "the intrados and extrados form two limits which the pressure curve must never exceed, and when this happens, equilibrium is impossible". This method would be described in Philippe Croisette-Desnoyers' course on "bridge construction" in 1885 and in what remains the magnum opus that marked the end of masonry bridge construction, Paul Séjourné's Grandes Voûtes, published in 1913.

In 1867, Durand-Claye improved this method, but his proposal was less successful because it required laborious calculations.

==== Advancements in materials and techniques ====
In the field of materials, progress was made in binders for producing mortars for sealing the voussoirs of vaults. In 1817, the Frenchman Louis Vicat discovered the principle of hydraulicity in lime, related to the proportion of clay and the firing temperature, and published his work without a patent. In 1824, the Briton Joseph Aspdin patented a quick-setting hydraulic lime, which he commercially called Portland cement. However, the breakthrough came in 1840 with the discovery of the principles of hydraulicity in slow-setting cements (now known as Portland cements) by Louis Vicat. As a result, mortars used to seal voussoirs experienced significant improvements in strength.

As far as construction techniques were concerned, Paul Séjourné revived the construction of vaults with successive rolls, a method used by the Romans and in the Middle Ages, but which had fallen into disuse, as well as the use of radiant centering and then inverted centering with steel cable ties. This allowed him to save 20 to 70% of the wood used and reduce construction time. In addition, inspired by the past, he emphasized the vault by systematically using archivolts, thus enhancing the elegance of its form.

In 1870, Jules Dupuit was the first to propose the articulation of the vaults, which allowed the materials to work better as the forces were better understood.

==== The great railway viaducts ====
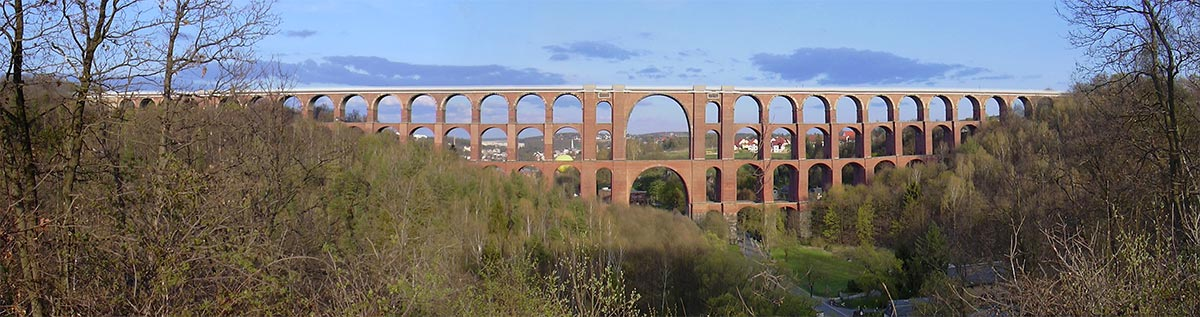
The Göltzschtal viaduct, the world's largest masonry viaduct

The development of railroads in the 19th century led to the appearance of large masonry viaducts. The layout of the railroads could not follow the contours of the land due to the low gradients allowed, less than 10 mm per meter at the beginning, and the large radius curves required for vehicle stability. The steepness of the gradients was limited by the adhesion of the locomotives, their low power, and inadequate braking systems.

In France, one of the first large viaducts was the Val-Fleury viaduct, built in 1840 on the Paris-Versailles line. Numerous other viaducts followed, such as the Nîmes Viaduct (Note: Prade 1988, p. 171) (1,569 meters long, one of the longest in France), the Barentin Viaduct (1844) (Note: Prade 1988, pp. 172–173) in Seine-Maritime, and the Saint-Chamas Viaduct (1848) (Note: Prade 1988, pp. 178–179) in the Bouches-du-Rhône, a curious structure of interlocking semicircular arches.

The same trend occurred in Europe, although less frequently than in France. (Note: Prade 1988, p. 106) In West Germany, the Bietigheim Viaduct, built between 1851 and 1853 on the Bruchsal-Ulm line, was a 262-meter-long viaduct with 18 arches and a span of 13.18 meters. In eastern Germany, the Göltzschtal Viaduct, spanning the Göltz River on the Regensburg-Leipzig line, is the largest masonry bridge ever built. Built between 1846 and 1851, it is 579.26 meters long and 85 meters high at its highest point, with four levels of vaults. (Note: Prade 1988, p. 122)

==== Masonry bridges with skewed vaults ====
The requirements of railroad layouts concerning the obstacles to be crossed led engineers to construct skewed bridges, i.e. bridges whose axis is inclined to the abutments, rather than bridges with straight crossings. The first skewed bridges were built on the Paris-Saint-Germain-en-Laye railroad.

=== 20th century ===
==== In the West ====
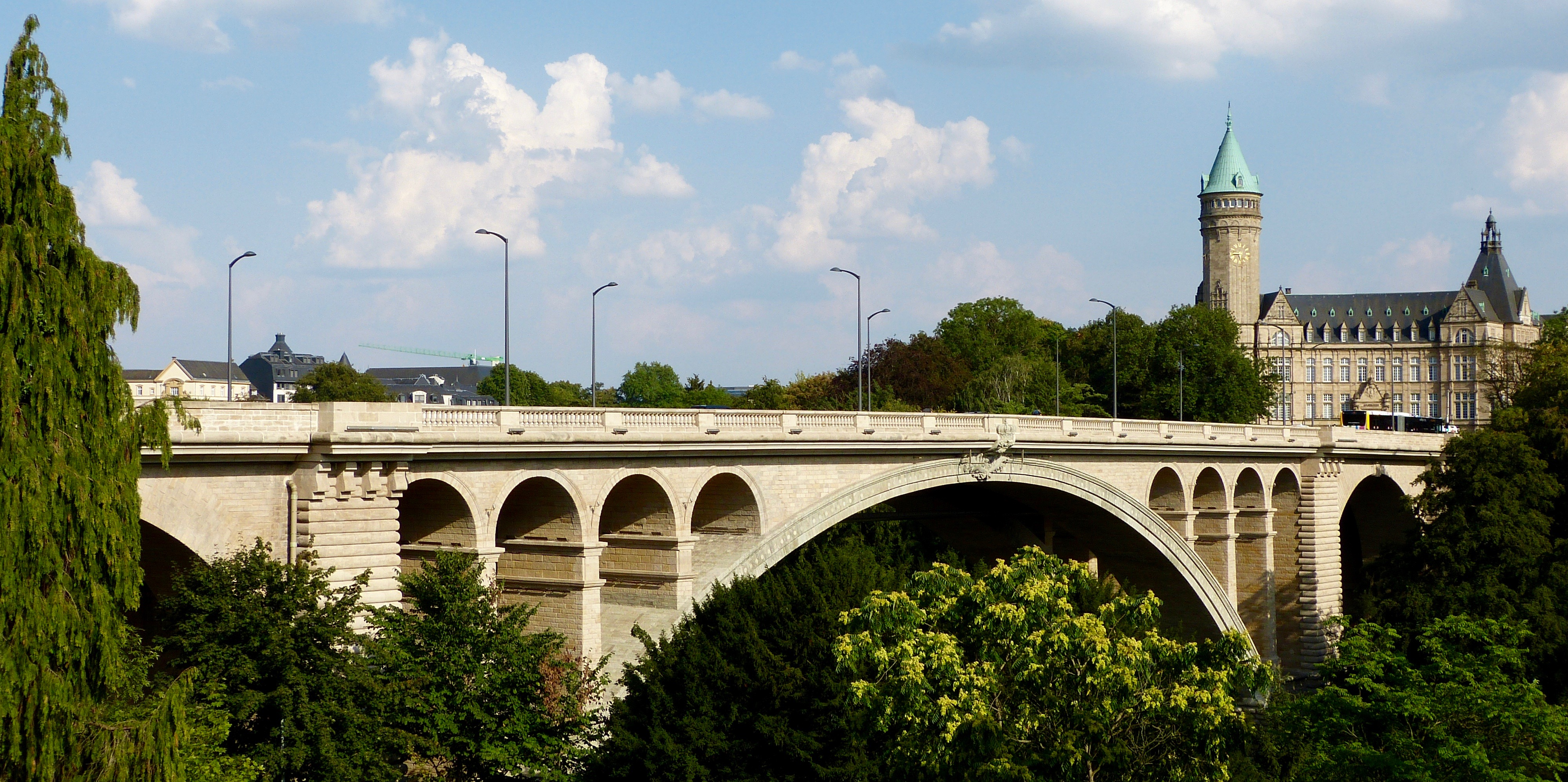
Adolphe Bridge in Luxembourg, by Paul Séjourné, the first with a double arch

A major innovation came in the design of the vaults. The increase in pressure thanks to modern mortars and the reduction in thickness had reached their limits to allow greater spans. Paul Séjourné then had the idea of doubling the vault with two parallel arches. Although this principle of doubling had been used in the past for small vaults such as the Pont du Gard or the Pont Saint-Bénézet, it was Paul Séjourné who fully understood its importance in terms of material efficiency and cost-effectiveness. He was the first to combine it with a reinforced concrete deck in one of the most magnificent works of the 20th century: the Adolphe Bridge in Luxembourg (1899–1903). The 84-meter span of this structure exceeded the largest span at the time of its inauguration by 17 meters. This principle was repeated several times in different countries, especially in America and France with the delicate Pont des Catalans in Toulouse (1904–1907).

It was surpassed in 1905 by the Pont de la Paix in Plauen over the Weisse River, which had a span of 90 meters. This structure was the last great masonry bridge built in the West. By doubling the size of the arch, Paul Séjourné paved the way for the construction of large reinforced concrete arch bridges. The arrival of new construction techniques using steel, such as suspension bridges, prestressed concrete bridges, or cable-stayed bridges, abruptly marked the end of masonry bridge construction in the Western world.

==== In the East ====
While in the West the technique was finally abandoned in favor of standard reinforced concrete bridges for small spans and other types for large spans, in China numerous masonry bridges were still built in the 20th century, especially in the 1960s and 1970s. For example, 1,152 bridges of this type were built in Fujian during these two decades, accounting for 60% of all bridges built during this period.

At the same time, long-span records were being broken. In 1965, the Hongdu Bridge in Guangxi broke the 100-meter barrier. In 1972, the Fengdu Jiuxigou Bridge in Sichuan reached a span of 116 meters. In 1990, the Fenghuang Bridge in Funan Province had a span of 120 meters. Finally, the absolute span record for a masonry bridge was set in July 2000 by the Danhe Bridge on the Jin-Jiao Highway in Shanxi, China, with a span of 146 meters.

== Structure of a masonry bridge ==
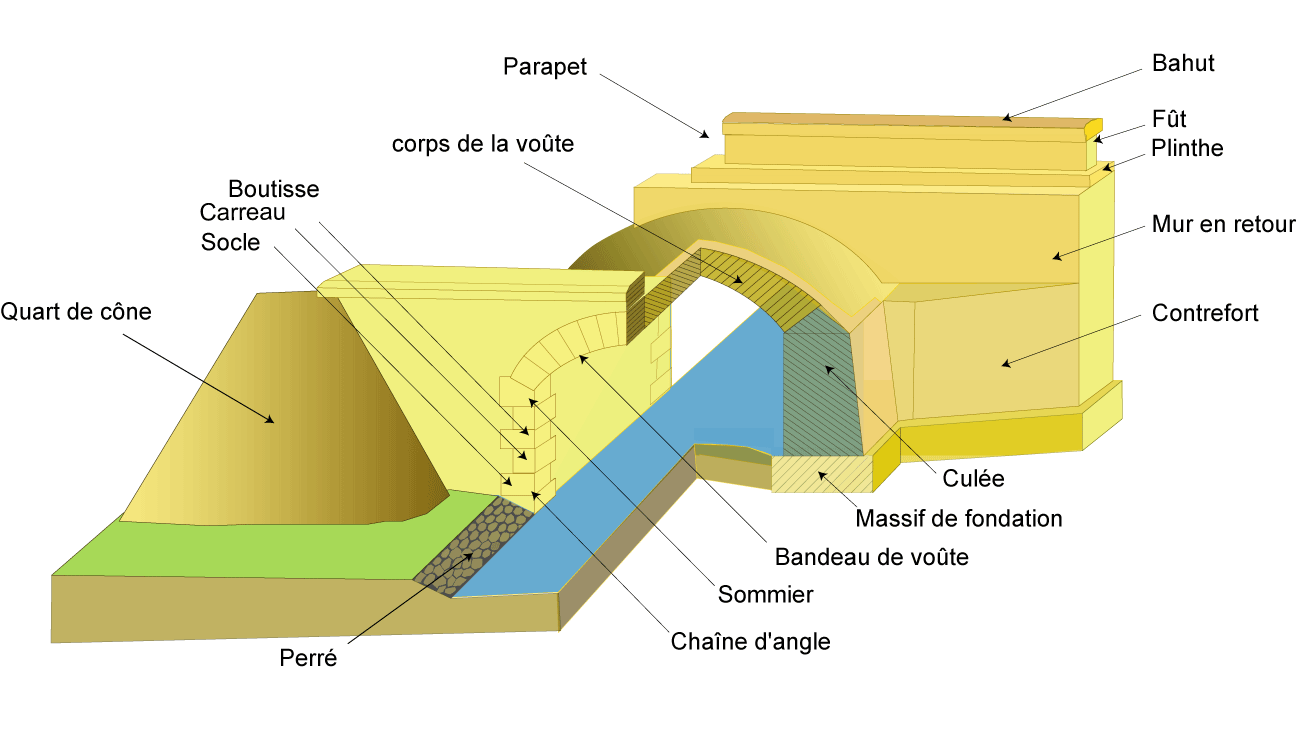
Exploded view of a masonry bridge

Masonry, being a material that does not perform well under tension, means that masonry bridges always take the form of a vault, the only form that satisfies this condition. A bridge consists of one or more arches resting on supports capable of resisting, without significant displacement, the mechanical action of the arch, known as shear. These supports generally consist of thick masonry walls at the ends, called abutments, and piers in the river.

=== Vault ===
The vault always has a vertical plane of transverse symmetry and almost always a vertical plane of longitudinal symmetry. Its variable thickness increases uniformly from the center, called the keystone, to the ends, called the springers.

==== Geometric characteristics ====
The vault is enclosed between two curved surfaces: the outer surface, called the extrados, and the inner surface, called the intrados or lining. When the projection of a vault is shown on a vertical plane, it is bounded by two lines: the extrados line and the intrados line. The latter is usually a geometric curve, such as a circular arc or a parabola.

The curve starts from the vertical lines that define the abutments. The points at which the intrados line intersects these verticals are called springs. The distance between the abutments is called the span. The line connecting the springs is called the spring line or chord. It is almost always horizontal. The vertical distance separating the intrados line from the springing line, measured at its midpoint, is called the rise.

==== Arch shape ====
| Types of structures | Diagram | Photo | Commentary |
|---|---|---|---|
| Semicircular arch | | Old bridge of Gien | The semicircular arch consists of a complete semicircle and is the most common type of arch. It accounts for about 67% of the masonry railroad bridges in the French network. These vaults can be raised (as in the old Gien bridge), slightly extended beyond the semicircle, or reduced. The Romans used almost exclusively the semicircular arch. |
| Pointed arch | | Saint-Martial Bridge (Limoges) | Also known as a broken arch, the pointed arch is formed by two circular arcs meeting at the keystone. This shape is ancient but was widely used in the Middle Ages because it reduces horizontal forces, making it easier to construct multi-span bridges. |
| Segmental arch | | Pont des Invalides | These vaults are designed using an arc of a circle smaller than a semicircle. The lowering of vaults developed from the 16th century, but it was in the 18th century, under the influence of Jean-Rodolphe Perronet, that the vaults of masonry bridges became much flatter and the piers thinner to allow better water flow. |
| Basket-handle arch | | Pont de Tolbiac | Very close to the ellipse, the basket-handle vault consists of an odd number of successive circular arcs of varying radii near the keystone. Designers often preferred this type of vault because it was easier to design than the elliptical. It also had the advantage of allowing a greater volume of water to pass through. |

==== Type of band ====
The band marks the transverse end of the vault. It receives the tympanic wall, which supports the filling of the structure. The part between the two bands, which forms the intrados of the vault, is called the lining. The type of band is mainly an architectural choice. It can be made of rubble, ashlar, or brick, with the visible face generally flat, although some structures have moldings when specific ornamentation is desired. Some types of bands offer advantages over others. A corbelled band, for example, facilitates the construction of the tympanum by providing ledges on the extrados so that each tympanum element doesn't have to be chamfered. There are also cow horn bands whose main function is to improve water drainage. Bands are more or less characteristic of a particular period.

| Extradosed roll | Double roll | Blocked | Non-extradosed double roll | Corbelled style |
|---|---|---|---|---|
| 1st – 19th century | 2nd – 19th century | 6th – 18th century | 11th – 17th century | 17th – 18th century |
| Pont Saint-Michel | Göltzsch Viaduct | Roman bridge, Estoublon | Lesdiguières Bridge | George V Bridge |

=== Foundation mass ===
The abutments and the return walls or wing walls (buttresses, quarter cones) rest on foundation masses that help to support or distribute the loads applied to the structure.

=== Parapet ===
The parapet consists of three parts:

- The base: the parapet support
- The shaft: the main body of the parapet
- The plinth: the foundation slab

=== Pier ===
If the bridge has multiple spans, the adjacent vaults rest on a common support called a pier. Like abutments, piers rest on foundations.

== Classification ==
Vaulted bridges can be distinguished by several criteria: the shape of the vault, the type of vault construction, and the type of cutwater or tailwater. Thus, the vault can be semicircular (perfect semicircle), segmental (arc segment), pointed, basket-handle, or elliptical. The band of the vault can be extradosed with radiating stones, double roll, blocked, non-extradosed double roll, corbelled style, with a corbelled slab. The starlings can be triangular, almond-shaped, rectangular, or circular.

== Notable masonry bridges ==
The largest masonry bridge in the United States is the James J. Hill Bridge over the Mississippi River, built in 1883 by railroad magnate James J. Hill, who wanted to impress his fellow citizens by building a structure that would honor him. It is 752.5 meters long and has 23 limestone arches with a full arch span of 23.49 meters. It is the only stone bridge over the Mississippi River. (Note: Prade 1990a, p. 113)

== See also ==
- Bridge
- Bridge failures

== Bibliography ==
A great many books have been written on the subject of masonry bridges, either in their entirety or in part. The list below, in chronological order of publication, includes the most significant and those that served as a source for the article.

=== History ===
- Duplomb, Charles (1911). Histoire générale des ponts de Paris (in French). Paris: Impr. Mersch.
- Maré, Éric (1954). The bridges of Britain. London: B.T. Batsford.
- Wurster, Eine Brücke bei Limyra in Lykien; Ganzert, Joachim (1978). The bridges of Britain. Berlin: German Archaeological Institute. pp. 288–307. ISSN 0003-8105.
- Yisheng, Mao (1980). Les ponts de Chine (in French). Beijing: Éditions en langues étrangères.
- Grattesat, Guy (1982). Ponts de France (in French). Paris: Presses des Ponts et Chaussées. ISBN 2-85978-030-0.
- Prade, Marcel (1986). Les Ponts, Monuments historiques (in French). Poitiers: Brissaud. ISBN 2-902170-54-8.
- Prade, Marcel (1988). Ponts et Viaducs au XIXe siècle (in French). Poitiers: Brissaud. ISBN 2-902170-59-9.
- Prade, Marcel (1990a). Les grands ponts du Monde (in French). Poitiers: Brissaud. ISBN 2-902170-68-8.
- Prade, Marcel (1990). Ponts remarquables d'Europe : ouvrage illustré de 1000 photogr., dessins, et reprod (in French). Poitiers: Brissaud. ISBN 2-902170-65-3.
- Marrey, Bernard (1995). Les Ponts modernes : XXe siècle (in French). Paris: Picard. ISBN 2-7084-0484-9.
- Collectif (2001). Troisième conférence internationale sur les ponts en arc (in French). Paris: Presses des Ponts et Chaussées. ISBN 978-2-85978-347-1. Archived from the original on January 20, 2025.
- Sassi Perino, Angia; Faraggiana, Giorgio (2004). Les Ponts (in French). Paris: Éditions Gründ. ISBN 978-2-7000-2640-5.
- Giraud, Marc; Bejui, Pascal (2010). Paul Séjourné, génie des grands viaducs (in French). La Régordane. ISBN 978-2-906984-89-9.

=== Conception and production ===
==== 17th century ====
- de La Hire, Philippe (1695). Traité de Mécanique (in French). Paris. Archived from the original on August 3, 2023.

==== 18th century ====
- de La Hire, Philippe (1712). Sur la construction des voûtes dans les édifices (in French). Paris: Mémoires de l'Académie Royale des Sciences 69. Archived from the original on September 18, 2024.
- Parent, Antoine (1713). Essais et Recherches de Mathématiques et de Physique (in French). Paris.
- Gautier, Henri (1716). Traité des ponts (in French). Paris. Archived from the original on July 3, 2024.
- Gautier, Henri (1716). Dissertation sur l'épaisseur des culées de ponts (in French). Paris. Archived from the original on August 3, 2023.
- de Tartereaux, Pierre Couplet (1731). "Sur les voûtes". Histoire de l'Académie royale des sciences, année 1729. Avec les mémoires de mathématique & de physique tirez des registres de cette Académie (in French). Paris: Imprimerie royale. pp. 75–81. Archived from the original on September 19, 2024.
- Forest de Bélidor, Bernard (1729). La Science des Ingénieurs dans la conduite des travaux de fortification et d'architecture civile (in French). Paris. Archived from the original on September 18, 2024.
- Couplet de Tartereaux, Pierre (1730). De la poussée des voûtes. Histoire de l'Académie Royale des Sciences, 117, Paris (in French). Paris: Académie Royale des Sciences. Archived from the original on July 18, 2021.
- Danyzy, Augustin (1732). "Méthode générale pour déterminer la résistance qu'il faut opposer à la poussée des voûtes". Histoire de la Société des Sciences établie à Montpellier (in French). pp. 40–56.
- Frézier, Amédée François (1737). La théorie et la pratique de la coupe de pierres et des bois pour la construction des voûtes et autres parties des bâtiments civils et militaires, ou traité de stéréotomie à l'usage de l'architecture (in French). Vol. 3. Strasbourg & Paris. Archived from the original on August 3, 2023.
- Coulomb, Charles Augustin (1773). Mémoires de mathématique et de physique, présentés à l'Académie Royale des Sciences par divers Savants et lus dans ses Assemblées (in French). Vol. 7. Paris. pp. 343–8. Archived from the original on July 18, 2021.
- Perronet, Jean-Rodolphe (1777). Mémoire sur le cintrement et le décintrement des ponts; et sur les différens mouvemens que prennent les voûtes pendant leur construction, dans Histoire de l'Académie royale des sciences. Année 1773. Avec les Mémoires de mathématique & de physique tirez des registres de cette Académie (in French). Paris: Imprimerie royale. pp. 33–50. Archived from the original on September 19, 2024.

==== 19th century ====
- Bérard, Joseph Balthasar (1810). Statique des voûtes (in French). Paris: Courcier. Archived from the original on September 18, 2024.
- Rondelet, Jean-Baptiste (1802–1817). Traité théorique et pratique de l'art de bâtir (in French). Paris: Jean-Baptiste Rondelet.
- Pillet, Jules (1895). Traité de stabilité des constructions (PDF) (in French). Paris: Baudry et Cie. Archived from the original on April 3, 2023.
- Lesage, Pierre-Charles (1810). Recueil de divers mémoires extraits de la Bibliothèque impériale des Ponts et chaussées à l'usage de MM. les Ingénieurs (in French). Paris.
- Lamé; Clapeyron (1823). Mémoire sur la stabilité de voûtes (in French). Paris: Annales des Mines. Archived from the original on September 8, 2024.
- Bruyère, Louis (1823–1828). Études relatives à l'art des constructions (in French). Paris: Bance.
- Navier, Claude-Louis-Marie-Henri (1833). Résumé des leçons données à l'Ecole des Ponts et Chaussées, sur l'application de la mécanique à l'établissement des constructions et des machines (in French) (2nd ed.). Paris: Carilian-Goeury. Archived from the original on August 1, 2023.
- Lefort, Pierre Alexandre Francis (1839). Études relatives à la construction des ponts biais, dans Annales des ponts et chaussées. Mémoires et documents relatifs à l'art des constructions et au service de l'ingénieur (in French). pp. 281–315. Archived from the original on September 19, 2024.
- Lefort, Pierre Alexandre Francis (1854). Sur la théorie de la construction des voûtes biaises cylindiques, dans Annales des ponts et chaussées. Mémoires et documents relatifs à l'art des constructions et au service de l'ingénieur (in French). pp. 87–93. Archived from the original on September 19, 2024.
- Méry, Édouard. Mémoire sur l'équilibre des voûtes en berceau (in French). pp. 50–70. Archived from the original on September 3, 2025.
- Cordier, Joseph (1841–1842). Mémoire sur les travaux publics (in French). Paris: Carilian-Gceury & V. Dalmont.
- Gauthey, Emiland (1843). Traité de la construction des ponts (in French). Liège (Belgium): Leduc.
- Boucher, Aristide (1848). Note sur la construction des voûtes biaises au moyen d'une série d'arcs droits accolés les uns aux autres, dans Annales des ponts et chaussées. Mémoires et documents relatifs à l'art des constructions et au service de l'ingénieur (in French). pp. 234–243. Archived from the original on September 19, 2024.
- Fontenay, Tony (1852). Construction des viaducs, ponts-aqueducs, ponts et ponceaux en maçonnerie (in French). Paris: Carilian-Goeury & Victor Dalmont.
- Poncelet, J.V (1852). Examen critique et historique des principales théories ou solutions concernant l'équilibre des voûtes (in French). Vol. XXXV. Paris: Comptes-rendus de l'Académie des sciences. 35, 494, 531, 577.
- Maillard de La Gournerie, Jules (1851). Considérations géométriques sur les arches biaises, dans Annales des ponts et chaussées. Mémoires et documents relatifs à l'art des constructions et au service de l'ingénieur (in French). pp. 82–115. Archived from the original on September 19, 2024.
- Graeff, Auguste (1852). Mémoire sur l'appareil et la construction des ponts biais, dans Annales des ponts et chaussées. Mémoires et documents relatifs à l'art des constructions et au service de l'ingénieur (in French). pp. 1–144. Archived from the original on September 19, 2024.
- Maillard de La Gournerie, Jules (1853). Note sur les arches biaises à l'occasion du mémoire de M. Graeff, dans Annales des ponts et chaussées. Mémoires et documents relatifs à l'art des constructions et au service de l'ingénieur (in French). pp. 281–288. Archived from the original on September 19, 2024.
- Graeff, Auguste (1854). "Observations sur les questions soulevées par la note de M. de la Gournerie". Annales des ponts et chaussées. Mémoires et documents relatifs à l'art des constructions et au service de l'ingénieur (in French). pp. 32–40. Archived from the original on September 19, 2024.
- Carvallo, Jules (1853). Étude sur la stabilité des voûtes (in French). Paris: Carilian-Goeury. Archived from the original on September 19, 2024.
- Morandière, Romain (1855). Note pour le tracé des voûtes biaises sur les cintres, dans Annales des ponts et chaussées. Mémoires et documents relatifs à l'art des constructions et au service de l'ingénieur (in French). pp. 186–191. Archived from the original on September 19, 2024.
- Leblanc, Charles (1856). Mémoire sur la stabilité des ponts biais en maçonnerie, dans Annales des ponts et chaussées. Mémoires et documents relatifs à l'art des constructions et au service de l'ingénieur (in French). pp. 54–88. Archived from the original on September 19, 2024.
- Leblanc, Charles (1869). Mémoire sur le calcul de la pression par unité de surface, dans le cas où la résultante des pressions n'est pas normale au joint, dans Annales des ponts et chaussées. Mémoires et documents relatifs à l'art des constructions et au service de l'ingénieur (in French). pp. 458–500. Archived from the original on September 19, 2024.
- Lucas, Félix (1861). Mémoire sur un nouvel appareil pour la construction des ponts biais, dans Annales des ponts et chaussées. Mémoires et documents relatifs à l'art des constructions et au service de l'ingénieur (in French). pp. 125–144. Archived from the original on September 19, 2024.
- Scheffler, Herman (1864). Traité de la stabilité des constructions (in French). Paris: Dunod. Archived from the original on August 3, 2023.
- Partiot, Léon (1864). Note sur le pont biais construit sur la Vézère, aux Eyzies, dans Annales des ponts et chaussées. Mémoires et documents relatifs à l'art des constructions et au service de l'ingénieur (in French). pp. 214–224. Archived from the original on September 19, 2024.
- Durand-Claye, Alfred (1867). Stabilité des voutes en maçonnerie (in French). Paris: Annales des Ponts et Chaussées. pp. 63–96. Archived from the original on September 12, 2024.
- Nördling, Wilhelm (1869). Note sur les ponts biais et les ponts courbes, dans Annales des ponts et chaussées. Mémoires et documents relatifs à l'art des constructions et au service de l'ingénieur (in French). pp. 433–444. Archived from the original on September 19, 2024.
- Dupuit, Jules (1870). Traité de l'équilibre des voûtes et de la construction des ponts en maçonnerie (in French). Dunod éditeur. pp. Paris. Archived from the original on August 1, 2023.
- Jourjon, Charles (1872). "Tracé des panneaux de douelle des voussoirs des voûtes biaises à section circulaire, lorsqu'elles sont appareillées comme les voûtes droites". Annales des ponts et chaussées. Mémoires et documents relatifs à l'art des constructions et au service de l'ingénieur (in French). pp. 413–414. Archived from the original on September 19, 2024.
- Durand-Claye, Alfred; Jourjon, Charles (1872). "Tracé des panneaux de douelle des voûtes biaises à section circulaire, lorsqu'elles sont appareillées comme les voûtes droites". Annales des ponts et chaussées. Mémoires et documents relatifs à l'art des constructions et au service de l'ingénieur (in French). pp. 85–90. Archived from the original on September 19, 2024.
- Morandière, Romain (1874). Traité de la construction des ponts et viaducs (in French). Paris: Dunod.
- Cètre, M (1874). Appareil hélicoïdal des voûtes biaises à section droite circulaire, dans Annales des ponts et chaussées. Mémoires et documents relatifs à l'art des constructions et au service de l'ingénieur (in French). p. 433. Archived from the original on September 19, 2024.
- Gros, Marcel (1877). "Note sur le tracé direct, en vraie grandeur, des panneaux des voussoirs d'un voûte biaise à section droite circulaire". Annales des ponts et chaussées. Mémoires et documents relatifs à l'art des constructions et au service de l'ingénieur (in French). pp. 533–546. Archived from the original on September 19, 2024.
- Gros, Marcel (1878). "Note sur les ponts biais et courbes (suite)". Annales des ponts et chaussées. Mémoires et documents relatifs à l'art des constructions et au service de l'ingénieur (in French). pp. 547–549. Archived from the original on September 19, 2024.
- Gros, Marcel (1876). "Tracé des panneaux de douelle et de lit des voussoirs d'une voûte biaise à section droite circulaire, lorsque la tête est en talus et que la voûte est appareillée comme une voûte droite". Annales des ponts et chaussées. Mémoires et documents relatifs à l'art des constructions et au service de l'ingénieur (in French). pp. 219–224. Archived from the original on September 19, 2024.
- Picard, Alfred (1879). "Voûtes biaises. Simplification pratique de l'appareil orthogonal convergent. Application au pont souterrain de Kœurs". Annales des ponts et chaussées. Mémoires et documents relatifs à l'art des constructions et au service de l'ingénieur (in French). pp. 339–370. Archived from the original on September 19, 2024.
- Durand-Claye, Alfred (1880). Stabilité des voûtes et des arcs (in French). Paris: Annales des ponts et chaussées. pp. 416–440.
- Sampité, Arthur (1882). "Appareil orthogonal dans les voûtes biaises dont la section droite est une ellipse surbaissée". Annales des ponts et chaussées. Mémoires et documents relatifs à l'art des constructions et au service de l'ingénieur (in French). pp. 578–599. Archived from the original on September 19, 2024.
- Fortet, D (1883). "Calcul et tracé des panneaux de voûtes biaise". Annales des ponts et chaussées. Mémoires et documents relatifs à l'art des constructions et au service de l'ingénieur (in French). pp. 26–33. Archived from the original on September 19, 2024.
- Croizette Desnoyers, Philippe (1885). Cours de construction des ponts (in French). Paris: Vve Dunod.
- Degrand, Eugène; Resal, Jean (1887). Ponts en maçonnerie (in French). Vol. 2: Construction. Paris: Baudry et Cie.
- Villarceau, Yvon (1853). Sur l'établissement des arches de pont, envisagé au point de vue de la plus grande stabilité. Mémoire accompagné de tables pour faciliter les applications numériques (in French). Paris: Imprimerie impériale. Archived from the original on May 21, 2023.
- Villarceau, Yvon (1889). "Supplément au mémoire sur l'établissement des arches de pont". Mémoires de l'Académie des sciences de l'Institut de France (in French). Paris: Gauthier-Villars. pp. 1–133. Archived from the original on September 19, 2024.
- Blot, G (1896). "Note sur l'appareil hélicoïdal des voûtes biaises par la méthode Theuil". Annales des ponts et chaussées. Mémoires et documents relatifs à l'art des constructions et au service de l'ingénieur (in French). pp. 663–680. Archived from the original on September 19, 2024.

==== 20th century ====
- de Dartein, Fernand (1912). Études sur les ponts en pierre remarquables par leur décoration antérieurs au XIXe siècle (in French). Paris: Librairie polytechnique Beranger.
- Séjourné, Paul (1913–1916). Grandes voûtes (in French). Bourges: Impr. Vve Tard.
- Jouret, Auguste (1946). Paul Séjourné (in French). Lyon: Impr. réunies.
- Encyclopédie pratique du Bâtiment et des Travaux Publics : Tome I (in French). Paris: Librairie Aristide Quillet. 1952.
- Encyclopédie pratique du Bâtiment et des Travaux Publics : Tome II (in French). Paris: Librairie Aristide Quillet. 1952.
- Encyclopédie pratique du Bâtiment et des Travaux Publics : Tome III (in French). Paris: Librairie Aristide Quillet. 1952.
- Valette, Roger (1958). La construction des ponts (in French). Paris: Éditions Dunod.
- Radenkovic, Dragos (1962). Théorie des charges limites. Séminaire de Plasticité (in French). J. MANDEL Ed. P.S.T. Min. Air, no 116. pp. 129–142.
- Beckett, Derrick (1969). Bridges (in French). London: Paul Hamlyn.
- Coussy, O; Salençon, J (1979). Analyse de la stabilité des ouvrages en terre par le calcul à la rupture. Annales des Ponts et Chaussées, 4etrimestre, 1979 : pp. ?-35 (in French).
- Rivière, P (1980). Évaluation de la stabilité des ponts maçonnerie (in French). Angers: Laboratoire régional d'Angers. CETE de l'Ouest.
- SETRA (1982). Les Ponts en maçonnerie (in French). Bagneux, ministère des Transports, Direction des routes.
- Grattesat, Guy (1984). Conception des ponts (in French). Eyrolles.
- Bernard-Gély, Anne; Calgaro, Jean-Armand (1994). Conception des ponts (in French). Paris: Presses des Ponts et Chaussées. ISBN 2-85978-215-X. Archived from the original on September 1, 2025.
- Salençon, Jean (2002). De l'élasto-plasticité au calcul à la rupture (in French). Paris: Éditions de l'École polytechnique. ISBN 978-2-7302-0915-1. Archived from the original on September 18, 2024.
- Delbecq, Jean-Michel (1982). Ponts en maçonnerie. Historique et Constitution. Évaluation de la stabilité. Guide pour l'utilisation du programme VOÛTE (PDF) (in French). Ministère des Transports. Direction des routes. Archived from the original on March 21, 2024.
- Fragnet, M (1992). Ponts en maçonnerie. Protection contre l'action des eaux. Guide technique (PDF) (in French). Sétra. Archived from the original on September 5, 2025.
- Élargissement des ponts en maçonnerie. Guide technique (PDF) (in French). Sétra. 2001.
- Domède, Nathalie (2006). Méthode de requalification des ponts en maçonnerie (in French). XXIVe Rencontres Universitaires de Génie Civil.
- Guide technique (2007). Cours d'eau et ponts (in French). Bagneux: SETRA. ISBN 978-2-11-094626-3.
