= Drop arch =

Drop arch may refer to:

- Basket-handle arch, a depressed form of the round arch
- Blunt arch, a depressed form of the pointed arch
