= Basket-handle arch =

Plane curve drawn by an odd number of circular arcs

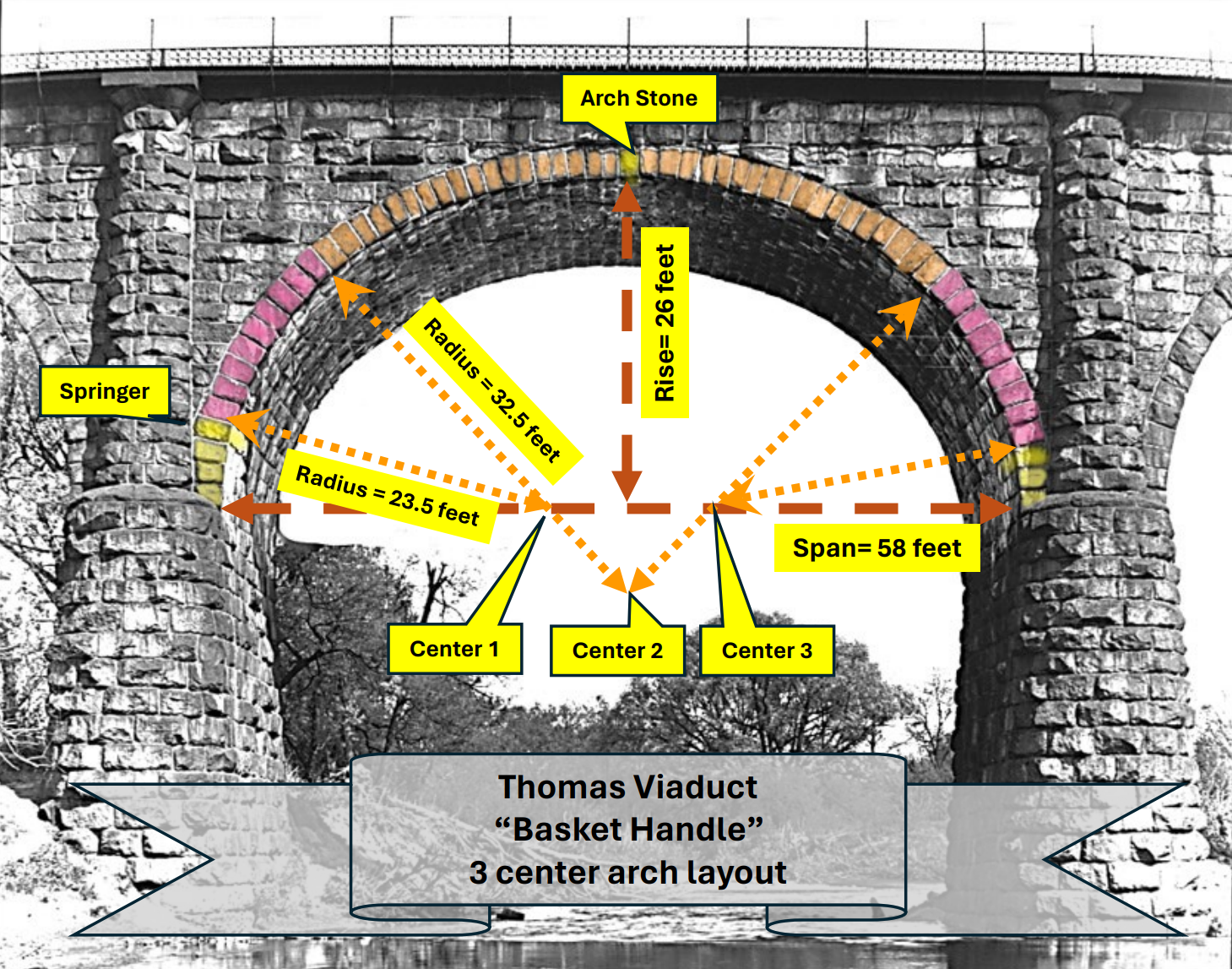
Thomas Viaduct of the Baltimore and Ohio railroad as an example of a basket handle arch.

A basket-handle arch (also depressed arch or chop arch) is characterized by an intrados profile formed by a sequence of circular arcs, each tangent to its neighbors, resulting in a smooth transition between arcs. The shape of a basket-handle arch resembles but is different from that of a semi-ellipse, with the latter featuring a continuous curvature that varies from the extremities of the long axis to the apex of the short axis.

The simplest form, a three-centered arch, consists of three arc segments with distinct centers, while a five-centered arch is also commonly used. This type of arch is prevalent in architectural applications, particularly in bridge construction. Arches following curves with more than three centers are also used.

== History ==
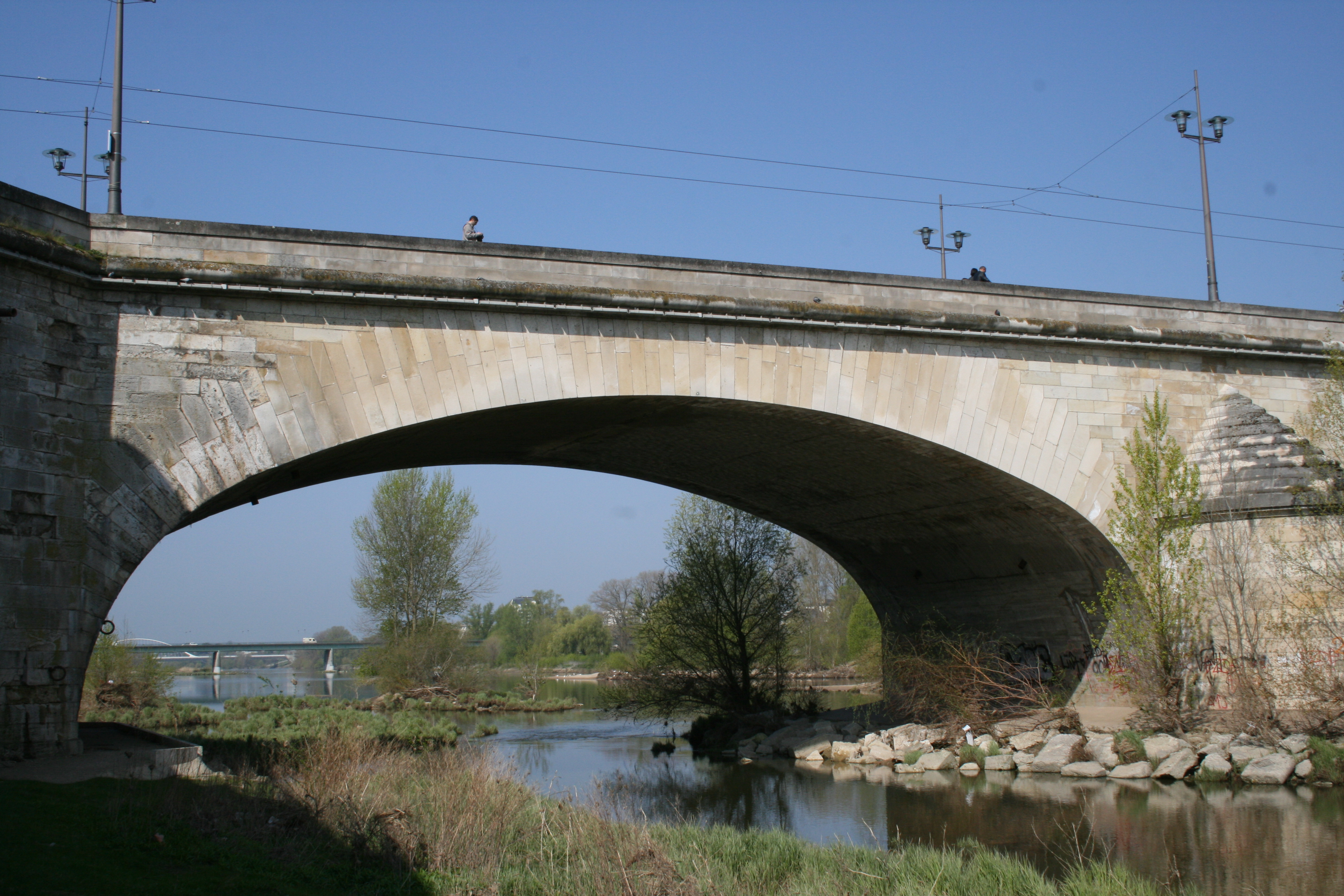
George V bridge in Orléans - Three-center basket-handle arch

Since Roman times, bridges vaults have been built with semicircular arches, forming a complete half-circumference. From the early Middle Ages onward, builders used the segmental arch, an incomplete half-circumference, to create vaults that were less than half the height of their opening.

The pointed arch, which emphasizes height by rising above half the opening, did not see use in bridge construction until the Middle Ages.

The basket-handle arch appeared at the beginning of the Renaissance, offering aesthetic advantages over segmental vaults, notably through its end arches being vertical and tangent to the supports.

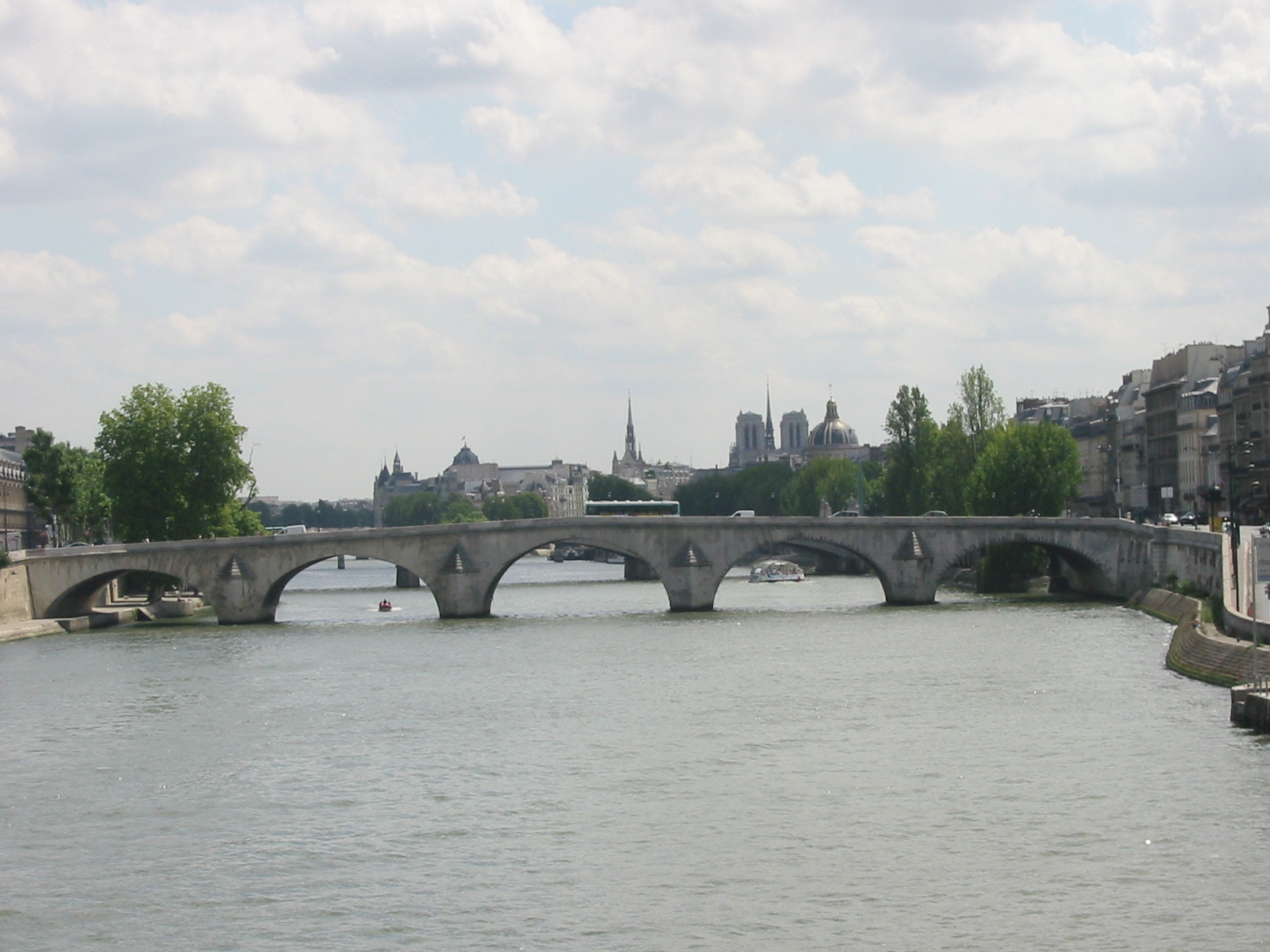
Pont Royal in Paris - Three-center basket-handle arch

The earliest applications of basket-handle arches in France appear in the Pont-Neuf in Toulouse, built in the 16th century, and the Pont Royal in the following century.

By the 18th century, the use of basket-handle arches became prevalent, particularly with three centers, as exemplified by the bridges at Vizille, Lavaur, Gignac, Blois (1716–1724), Orléans (1750–1760), Moulins (1756–1764), and Saumur (1756–1770).

Notable architect Jean-Rodolphe Perronet designed bridges with eleven centers during the latter half of the 18th century, including those at Mantes (1757–1765), Nogent (1766–1769), and Neuilly (1766–1774). The Tours bridge (1764–1777) also featured eleven centers. Other arches were generally reduced to one-third or slightly more, except for Neuilly, which was reduced to one-fourth.

In the 19th century, basket-handle arches were utilized in France's first major railroad bridges, including the Cinq-Mars bridge (1846–1847), Port-de-Piles bridge (1846–1848), Morandière bridges: Montlouis (1843–1845), and Plessis-les-Tours (1855–1857).

In England, while the Gloucester Bridge (1826–1827) and the London Bridge (1824–1831) were elliptical, the Waterloo Bridge in London (1816–1818) retained the basket-handle arch form.

Builders continued to construct basket-handle arches into the late 19th and early 20th centuries. Notable examples include the Edmonson Avenue Bridge in Baltimore (1908–1909) with three centers, the Annibal Bridge (1868–1870) and Devil's Bridge (1870–1872) with five centers, the Emperor Francis Bridge in Prague (1898–1901) with seven centers, and the Signac Bridge (1871–1872) with nineteen centers.

In the United States, the Thomas Viaduct, featuring a basket-handle arch, was built between 1833 and 1835. It is now owned and operated by CSX Transportation and remains one of the oldest railroad bridges still in service.

== Comparison between basket handle arch and ellipse ==
=== Aesthetics ===
Ancient architects placed considerable importance on the methods used to define the outline of the basket-handle arch. The flexibility inherent in these processes allowed for a wide variety of configurations, leading many architects to favor this type of curve over the ellipse, whose contour is rigidly determined by geometric principles.

In the case of an ellipse, the opening of a vault and the height at the center—corresponding to the major and minor axes—result in fixed points along the intrados curve, leaving no room for architectural modification. Conversely, the multi-center curve offers greater design freedom, allowing architects to adjust the curve's base and apex according to their preferences, depending on the arrangement of the centers. This adaptability made the basket-handle arch an attractive option for those seeking aesthetic flexibility.

=== Advantages and disadvantages ===
The advantages of this layout approach were significant: establishing full-scale grooves was perceived as easier and more precise, allowing immediate on-site layout of the normals and segment joints.

The number of voussoir shapes was constrained by the number of distinct radii used, whereas for elliptical arches, this number was typically half the number of voussoirs plus one.

However, the layout's discontinuity led to unsightly voussoirs that could not always be removed during restoration work.

== Tracing curves with three centers ==
=== The ancient oval ===
Trace of a three-center cove using the method of Heron of Alexandria (without construction circles)

Although the basket-handle arch was not utilized for bridge vaults in ancient times, it found application in the construction of other types of vaults. Heron of Alexandria, who authored mathematical treatises more than a century before the Common Era, outlined a straightforward method for tracing this arch.

In Heron's method, if AB represents the width of the intended vault and the height (or rise) is undetermined, a half-circumference is described on AB. A vertical line OC is drawn through point C on this arc, and a tangent mn is constructed at point C. Lengths Cm and Cn are taken to be equal to half the radius of the arc. By connecting points mO and nO, points D and E are established. An isosceles triangle DOE is then traced, with its base equal to the height of the arch. Next, the line segment DA is divided into four equal parts, and parallels to DO are drawn through these division points (a, b, c). The intersections of these parallels with the horizontal axis AB and the extended vertical axis CO yield the necessary centers for tracing various curves with three centers along AB, often referred to as the ancient oval.

Trace of a three-center cove using the method of Heron of Alexandria (with construction circles)

As the basket-handle arch became more prevalent in bridge construction, numerous procedures for tracing it emerged, leading to an increase in the number of centers used. The objective was to create perfectly continuous curves with an aesthetically pleasing contour. Given the indeterminate nature of the problem, certain conditions were often imposed arbitrarily to achieve the desired result.

For instance, it was sometimes accepted that the arcs of circles composing the curve must correspond to equal angles at the center, while at other times, these arcs were required to be of equal length. Additionally, either the amplitude of the angles or the lengths of the successive radii were allowed to vary according to specific proportions.

A consistent ratio between the lowering of the arch and the number of centers used to trace the intrados curve was also established. This lowering is measured by the ratio of the rise (b) to the width of the arch (2a), expressed as b/2a. Acceptable ratios may include one-third, one-quarter, or one-fifth; However, if the ratio falls below one-fifth, a circular arc is generally preferred over the basket-handle arch or ellipse. For steeper slopes, it is advisable to employ at least five centers, with some designs utilizing up to eleven centers, as seen in the curve of the Neuilly Bridge, or even up to nineteen for the Signac Bridge. As one of the centers must always be positioned on the vertical axis, the remaining centers are symmetrically arranged, resulting in an odd total number of centers.

=== The Huygens method ===
Trace of a three-center cove using the Huygens method

For constructing curves with three centers, Huyghens outlines a method that involves tracing arcs of varying radii corresponding to equal angles, specifically angles of 60 degrees.

To begin, let AB represent the opening and OE signify the arrow of the vault. From the center point O, an arc AMF is drawn using radius OA. The arc AM is then taken to be one-sixth of the circumference, meaning its chord equals the radius OA. The chords AM and MF are drawn, followed by a line Em through point E, which is the endpoint of the minor axis, parallel to MF.

The intersection of chords AM and Em determines point m, the boundary of the first arc. By drawing the line mP parallel to MO, points n and P are established as the two centers required for the construction. The third center n is positioned at a distance n'O from the axis OE, equal to nO.

Analysis of the figure reveals that the three arcs—Am, mEm', and m'B—comprise the curve and correspond to equal angles at the centers Anm, mPm', and m'n'B, all measuring 60 degrees.

=== The Bossut method ===
Trace of a three-center cove using the Bossut method.

Charles Bossut proposed a more efficient method for tracing a three-center curve, which simplifies the process.

In this method, AB represents the opening and OE denotes the arrow of the vault, serving as the long and short axes of the curve. To begin, the line segment AE is drawn. From point E, a segment EF' is taken, equal to the difference between OA and OE. A perpendicular line is then drawn from the midpoint m of AF'. The points n and P, where this perpendicular intersects the major axis and the extension of the minor axis, serve as the two centers required for the construction.

When using the same opening and rise, the curve produced by this method exhibits minimal deviation from those generated by previous techniques.

== Curves with more than three centers ==
For curves with more than three centers, the methods indicated by Bérard, Jean-Rodolphe Perronet, Émiland Gauthey, and others consisted, as for the Neuilly bridge, in proceeding by trial and error.

Tracing a first approximate curve according to arbitrary data, whose elements were then rectified, using more or less certain formulas, so that they passed exactly through the extremities of the major and minor axes.

=== The Michal method ===
Trace of a seven-center cove using the Michal method.

In a paper published in 1831, mathematician Michal addressed the problem of curve construction with a scientific approach. He developed tables containing the necessary data to draw curves with 5, 7, and 9 centers, achieving precise results without the need for trial and error.

Michal's calculation method is applicable to curves with any number of centers. He noted that the conditions required to resolve the problem can be somewhat arbitrary. To address this, he proposed that the curves be constructed using either arcs of a circle that subtend equal angles or arcs of equal length. However, to fully determine the radii of these arcs, he also posited that the radii should correspond to the radii of curvature of an ellipse centered at the midpoint of each arc, where the opening serves as the major axis and the ascent functions as the minor axis.

As the number of centers increases, the resulting curve approximates the shape of an ellipse with the same opening and slope.

The following table illustrates the construction of a basket-handle arch, characterized by equal angles subtended by the various arcs that comprise it. The proportional values for the initial radii are calculated using half the opening as the unit of measurement. Additionally, the overhang is defined as the ratio of the arrow (the vertical distance from the highest point of the arch to the line connecting its endpoints) to the total opening.

5 centers		7 centers			9 centers			
Drop	1st radius	Drop	1st radius	2nd radius	Drop	1st radius	2nd radius	3nd radius
0,36	0,556	0,33	0,455	0,63	0,25	0,259	0,341	0,597
0,35	0,53	0,32	0,431	0,604	0,24	0,24	0,318	0,556
0,34	0,504	0,31	0,406	0,578	0,23	0,222	0,296	0,535
0,33	0,477	0,3	0,383	0,551	0,22	0,203	0,276	0,504
0,32	0,45	0,29	0,359	0,525	0,21	0,185	0,251	0,474
0,31	0,423	0,28	0,346	0,498	0,2	0,166	0,228	0,443
0,3	0,396	0,27	0,312	0,472				
		0,26	0,289	0,445				
		0,25	0,265	0,419				

The table provided allows for the straightforward construction of a basket-handle arch with any specified opening using five, seven, or nine centers, eliminating the need for extensive calculations. The only stipulation is that the drop must match one of the values proposed by Michal.

For instance, to draw a curve with seven centers, a 12-meter opening, and a 3-meter slope corresponding to a drop of one-quarter (or 0.25), the first and second radii can be calculated as follows: 6×0.265 and 6×0.419, resulting in values of 1.594 meters and 2.514 meters, respectively.

To inscribe the curve within a rectangle labeled ABCD, one would start by describing a semicircle on line segment AB, which serves as the diameter, and divide it into seven equal parts. Chords Aa, ab, bc, and cd are then traced, with chord cd representing a half-division.

On the AB axis, from point A, a length of 1.590 meters is measured to establish the first center, labeled m_{1}. A parallel line with radius O_{a} is drawn through this point, intersecting chord Aa at point n, marking the endpoint of the first arc. From point n, a length of nm_{2} equal to 2.514 meters is measured to identify the second center, m_{2}. A parallel line with radius O_{b} is drawn from point m_{2}, while a parallel line to chord ab is drawn from point n. The intersection of these two parallels at point n′ defines the endpoint of the second arc.

Continuing this process, a parallel is drawn through point n′ to chord bc, and from point E, a parallel is drawn to chord cd. The intersection of these two lines at point n′′ is used to draw a parallel to radius O_{c}. The points m_{3} and m_{4}, where this line intersects the extensions of radius n′m_{2} and the vertical axis, become the third and fourth centers. The final three centers, m_{5}, m_{6}, and m_{7,} are positioned symmetrically relative to the first three centers m_{1}, m_{2}, and m_{3}.

As illustrated in the figure, the arcs An, nn′, n′n′′, etc., subtend equal angles at their centers, specifically 51° 34' 17" 14'. Moreover, constructing a semi-ellipse with AB as the major axis and OE as the minor axis reveals that the arcs of the semi-ellipse, contained within the same angles as the circular arcs, possess a radius of curvature equal to that of the arcs themselves.

This method demonstrates the ease with which curves can be constructed with five, seven, or nine centers.

=== The Lerouge method ===
Following Mr. Michal's contributions, the subject was further explored by Mr. Lerouge, the chief engineer of the Ponts et Chaussées. Lerouge developed tables for constructing curves with three, five, seven, and even up to fifteen centers.

His approach diverges from Michal's methodology by stipulating that the successive radii must increase according to an arithmetic progression. This requirement means that the angles formed between the radii do not necessarily need to be equal, allowing for greater flexibility in the design of the curves.
