= Jean Hupeau =

French architect and engineer (1710–1763)

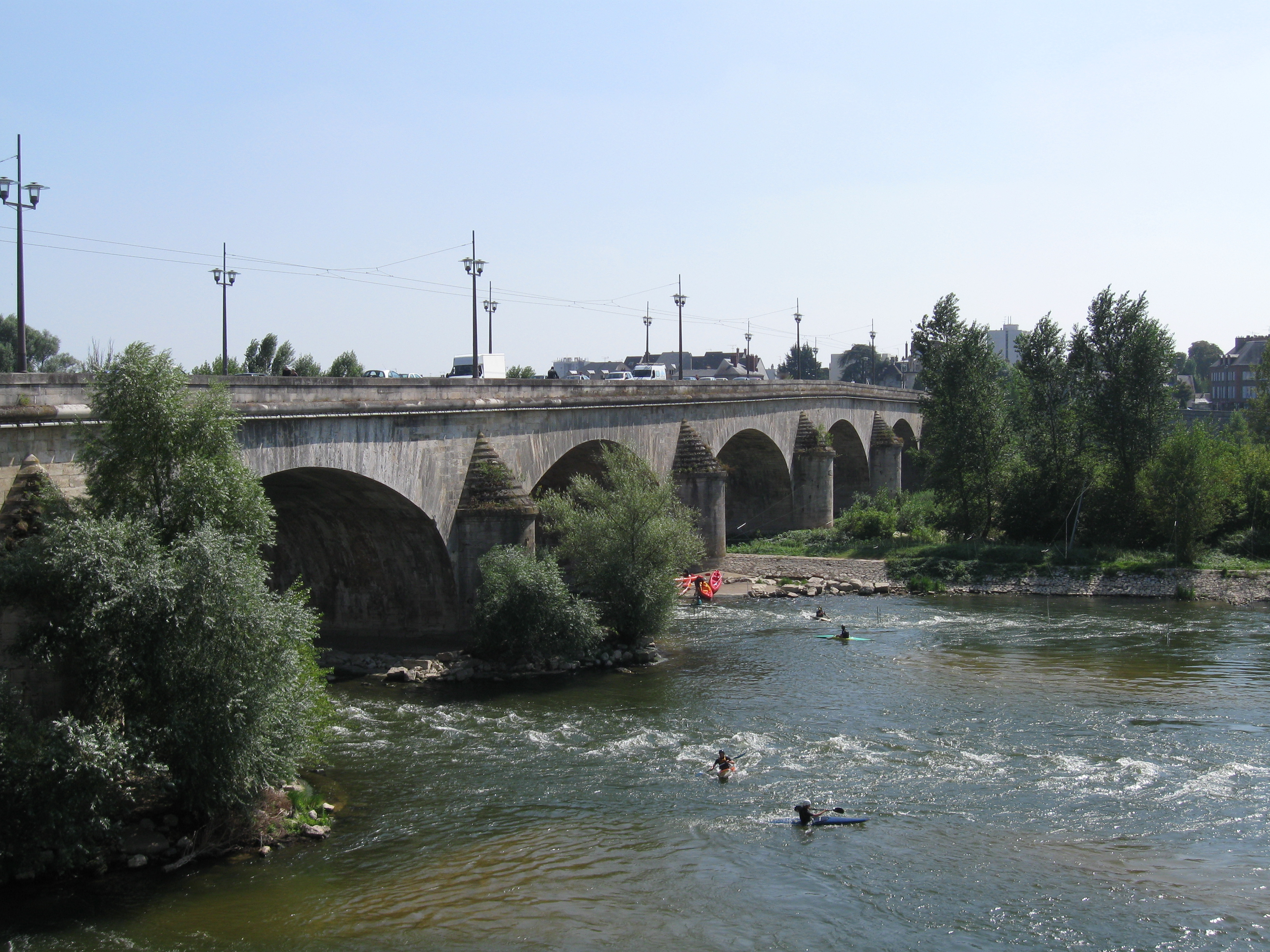
Pont Royal or ponte George V in Orléans

Jean Hupeau (1710 - Paris, 10 March 1763) was a French architect and engineer best known for building the George V Bridge in Orleans.

== Biography ==
In 1731 he was appointed engineer of the généralité of Riom and then of that of Soissons. On May 8, 1742, he was appointed inspector of bridges and roads, and in 1754, first engineer to replace Germain Boffrand.

His art was recognized and on January 10, 1757, he was elected to the Académie royale d'architecture. He died on March 10, 1763, after a long illness and was replaced by Jean-Rodolphe Perronet as a case of the Corps des Ponts et Chaussées.

== Works ==
In 1750, he drew up the project for the Orléans Bridge. The bridge was not built in the Rue de Recouvrance, but upstream 49 meters allowing to trace, in perfect alignment, the Rue Royale with Avenue Dauphine. The traffic design is harmonious and you can see the work of an urban planner.

For this project he succeeded Robert Pitrou, also an inspector general, who had already designed the same bridge. He questioned the previous project and proposed a more economical design: a bridge with 9 arches instead of 11 and a length of 165 meters instead of 189.

He was an architect who perfectly adapted the work to its destination and site. He had a sense of visual pleasure, a pleasure born largely of habit that led him to harmoniously combine the best projects he had already seen. For the ramps he chose the minimum value, as Louis de Règemorte had done at Moulins. The final result is of great nobility and simplicity, which led him to remove, during the execution of the works, the obelisk foreseen in the project. The pavilions and facades of the Rue Royale, also by his hand, are in the same classical style.

A few years later he directed the construction of the bridges of Joigny and Cravant on the Yonne River and those of Montereau and Mantes on the Seine.

Finally, he designed the Trilport bridge over the Marne, a project of a bridge with three low arches with spans of 26 meters, and whose piers formed an angle of 72 degrees with the axis of the bridge. Hupeau's design was adopted in preference to a design by Perronet, and the work was directed by Chézy.

Since the delivery of the George V bridge in Orleans was to be made one year after the start of the work, the difficulties encountered lead to a postponement of this deadline by two years. Thus the builder Jean Hupeau, who died on March 10, 1763, in Paris, left the completion of his main work to his successor.

== Bibliography ==
- François-Pierre-H Tarbé de Saint-Hardouin (1884). Notices biographiques sur les ingénieurs des ponts et chaussées depuis la création du corps, en 1716, jusqu'à nos jours - Jean Hupeau. Parigi: Librairie Polytechnique.
- AA.VV. (October 1993). Grand livre du Pont Royal. Orléans: Edition de la Société des Amis des Musées d'Orléans. ISBN 2-9503926-3-6.
- Henry Lemonnier, W. Viennot, Procès-verbaux de l'Académie Royale d'Architecture, 1671-1793, Tome X Table générale, p.|128, Librairie Armand Colin, Paris, 1926 "(online)". Paris J. Schemit. 1911.
