= George V Bridge, Orléans =

George V Bridge, Orléans Pont George-V
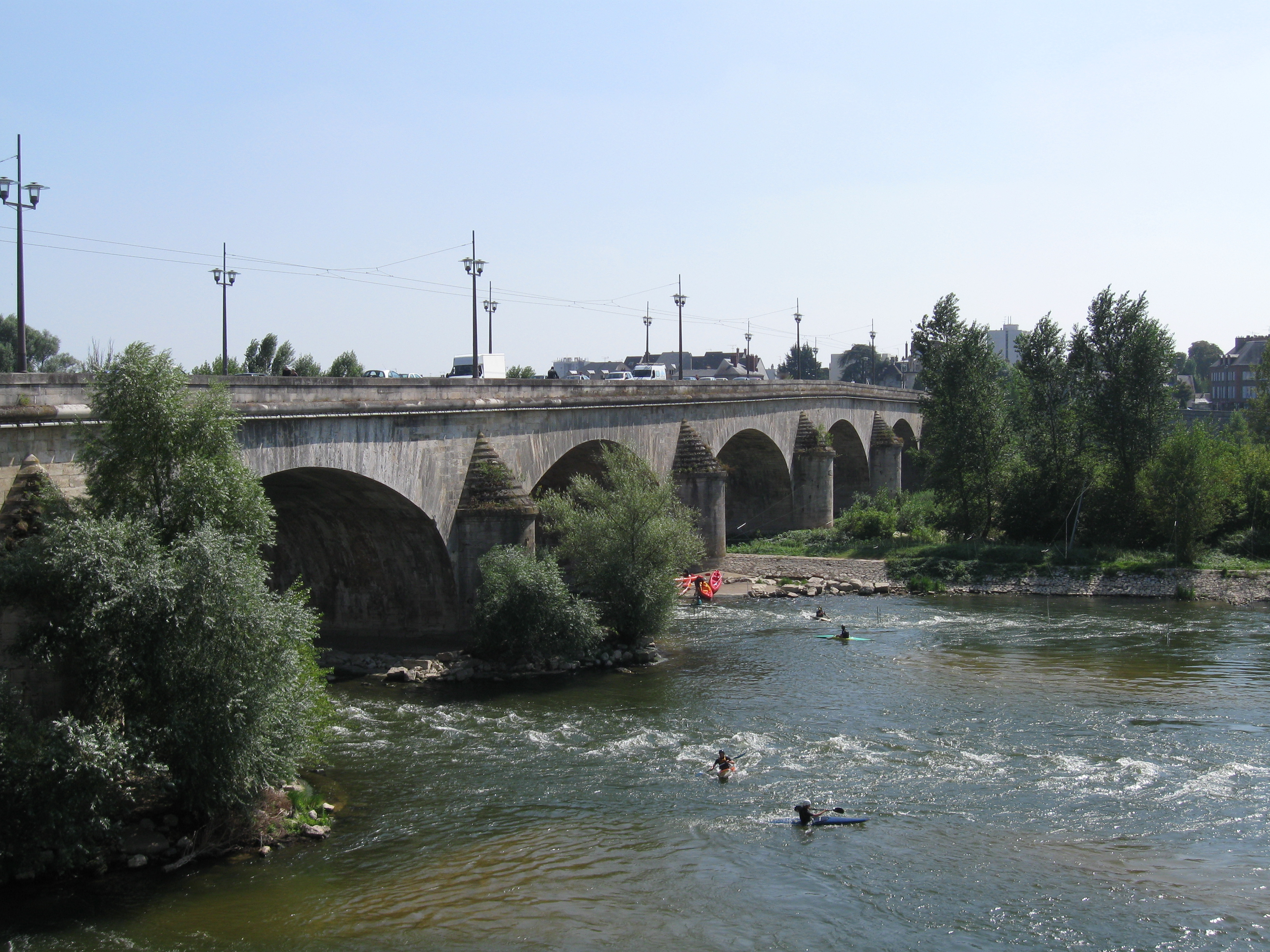
- Coordinates: 47°53′48″N 1°54′15″E
- Carries: Motor vehicles, tram
- Crosses: Loire
- Locale: Orléans

Characteristics
- Design: Arch Bridge
- Material: Stone
- Total length: 325m
- Width: 15.20m
- Longest span: 32.5m

History
- Architect: Jean Hupeau
- Designer: Jean Cadet Limay
- Engineering design by: John Pint John Rondel, Robert Soyer
- Construction start: 1751
- Construction end: 1763

Location
- Interactive map of George V Bridge, Orléans

The George V Bridge is a road and tram bridge that crosses the Loire in Orléans, France. It is an arched masonry bridge spanning a distance of 325 m. Designed by Jean Hupeau, it was built between 1751 and 1760, at the request of Daniel-Charles Trudaine, administrator and civil engineer. It was renamed in honour of King George V at the beginning of the World War I out of respect of Britain's role.

Today, it carries Line A of the Orléans tramway as well as road traffic, and is noted for a statue of Joan of Arc by sculptor Edme-François-Étienne Gois at its southern end.
