= Orléans AOC =

Orléans
- Wine region
- Type: AOC
- Year established: 2006
- Country: France
- Sub-regions: Loiret
- Climate region: mediterranean
- Soil conditions: clay-silicate and gravel-silicate
- Size of planted vineyards: 88 ha
- Grapes produced: Pinot noir, Pinot Meunier and Pinot gris for red and rosé wines. Chardonnay and Pinot gris for white wines.
- Official designation(s): AOC

Orléans (French pronunciation: [ɔʁleɑ̃]) is an Appellation d'origine contrôlée (AOC) for wine in the Loire Valley wine region of France situated around the city of Orléans.

== History ==
=== Contemporary history ===
This wine has held AOC status since September 2006. Prior to this date it held VDQS status, and the VDQS was renamed from Vins de l'Orléanais to Orléans in 2002. In the course of the 20th century, the Orléans wine-growing area went through a serious decline. Its accession to AOC status has come about thanks to the unstinting efforts of its producers over the last 20 years.

== Geographical Location ==
The area lies in the Loiret department in the communes of Saint-Jean-de-la-Ruelle, Saint-Pryvé-Saint-Mesmin, Baule, Beaugency, Chécy, Cléry-Saint-André, Mardié, Mareau-aux-Prés, Meung-sur-Loire, Mézières-lez-Cléry, Olivet, Orléans, Saint-Ay, Saint-Hilaire-Saint-Mesmin and Saint-Jean-de-Braye.

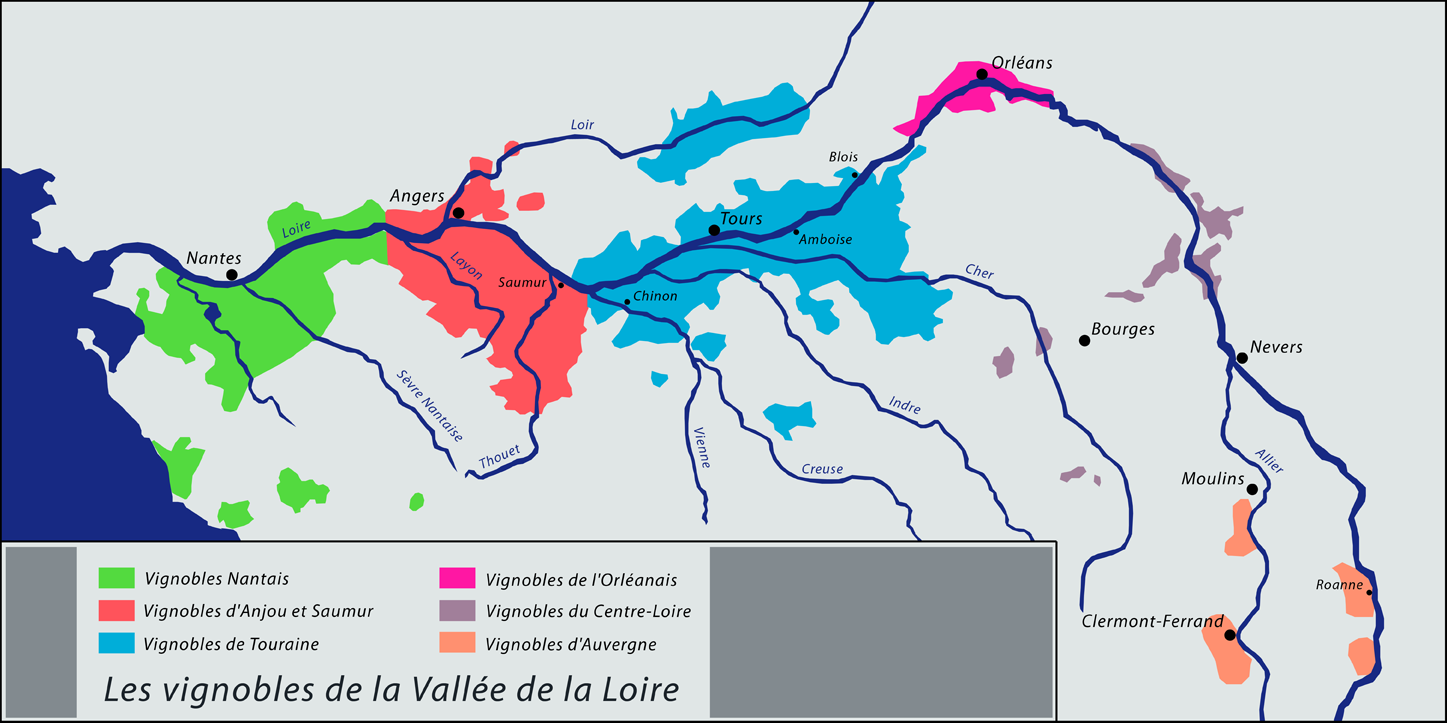
Wine-growing areas of the Loire Valley

=== Geology ===
Siliceous clay and siliceous gravel soils.

=== Climate ===
The climate is semi-oceanic with continental influences.

Orléans

Temperatures - Readings taken at Orléans-Bricy 1961–1990
Month:	Jan	Feb	Mar	Apr	May	June	July	Aug	Sept	Oct	Nov	Dec	Year:
Average minimum temperatures (°C)	0.3	0.8	2.2	4.3	7.8	10.7	12.6	12.3	10.3	7.3	3.3	1.1	6.1
Average Temperatures (°C)	3.1.	4.2	6.6	9.3	12.9	16.2	18.5	18.2	15.8	11.7	6.6	3.8	10.6
Average Maximum Temperatures (°C)	5.9	7.6	10.9	14.3	18.1	21.6	24.4	24.0	21.2	16.2	9.9	6.5	15.1

Precipitation, relative humidity and sunshine - Readings taken at Orléans-Bircy 1961–1990
Month:	Jan	Feb	Mar	Apr	May	June	July	Aug	Sept	Oct	Nov	Dec	Year:
Cumulative monthly precipitation (mm)	55.2	49.7	51.8	47.9	65.8	47.5	52.4	45.3	49.3	57.9	60.1	54.3	637.2
Relative Humidity (%)	89	85	79	74	76	74	72	72	77	84	89	90	80
Total sunshine (hours)	58.5	85.2	134.7	176.6	206.7	230.4	252.2	225	180.3	129.5	74.6	50.7	1804.5

== Wine-growing area ==
=== Profile ===
The total surface area under cultivation is 88 hectares (220 acres).

=== Grape varieties ===
Pinot noir and Pinot Meunier are the varieties used to make red wine. White wines are made from Chardonnay grapes, which must constitute at least 60% of the total grapes used and can be blended with Pinot gris. In reality, however, only Chardonnay tend to be used. Rosé wines are made from two Pinot varieties, Pinot Meunier and Pinot noir.

=== Types of wines and gastronomy ===
The wines are generally straightforward, honest and fruity. They are made to be drunk within a relatively short time, between 2 and 5 years after bottling.

== Bibliography ==
- Michel Mastrojanni: Les Vins de France (guide vert solar). Éditions Solar, Paris 1992 – 1994 – 1998.
