= Cravant =

Cravant may refer to:

- Cravant, Loiret, France
- Cravant, Yonne, France
  - Battle of Cravant (1423)
- Cravant-les-Côteaux, Indre-et-Loire, France
