= Promodis =

Logo

Promodis (name derived from PROcess, MOdern, DIStribution) is the first European network for distribution of agricultural machinery and spare parts. It is based in Saint-Cyr-en-Val in France.

== Background ==
Promodis is a cooperative created by a group of FIAT dealers on 12 October 1984 and owned by almost 130 independent distributors (more than 410 points of sale of which 300 self-service store), 24 in Spain (40 points of sale), 2 in Benelux (3 points of sale), 1 in Switzerland (2 points of sale), 10 in Poland (13 points of sale) and the others in France. In addition to their tractor products, the brand sells machinery (AVANT, MC HALE, KUHN, KRONE, MX, etc.) and spare parts and consumables in the self-service store. As in the car industry, the brand also proposes quick troubleshooting service (windows, air conditioning, sprayer control, hydraulic hose repair, etc.).

The network employs 3,400 people on which 2,100 mechanics. The total turnover of the company and its subsidiaries (Agriest, Centradis, Dimagro, etc.) was 332 M€ in 2013.

The group and the points of sale of its members represent an annual turnover of almost 2 billions € in 2013.

== History ==
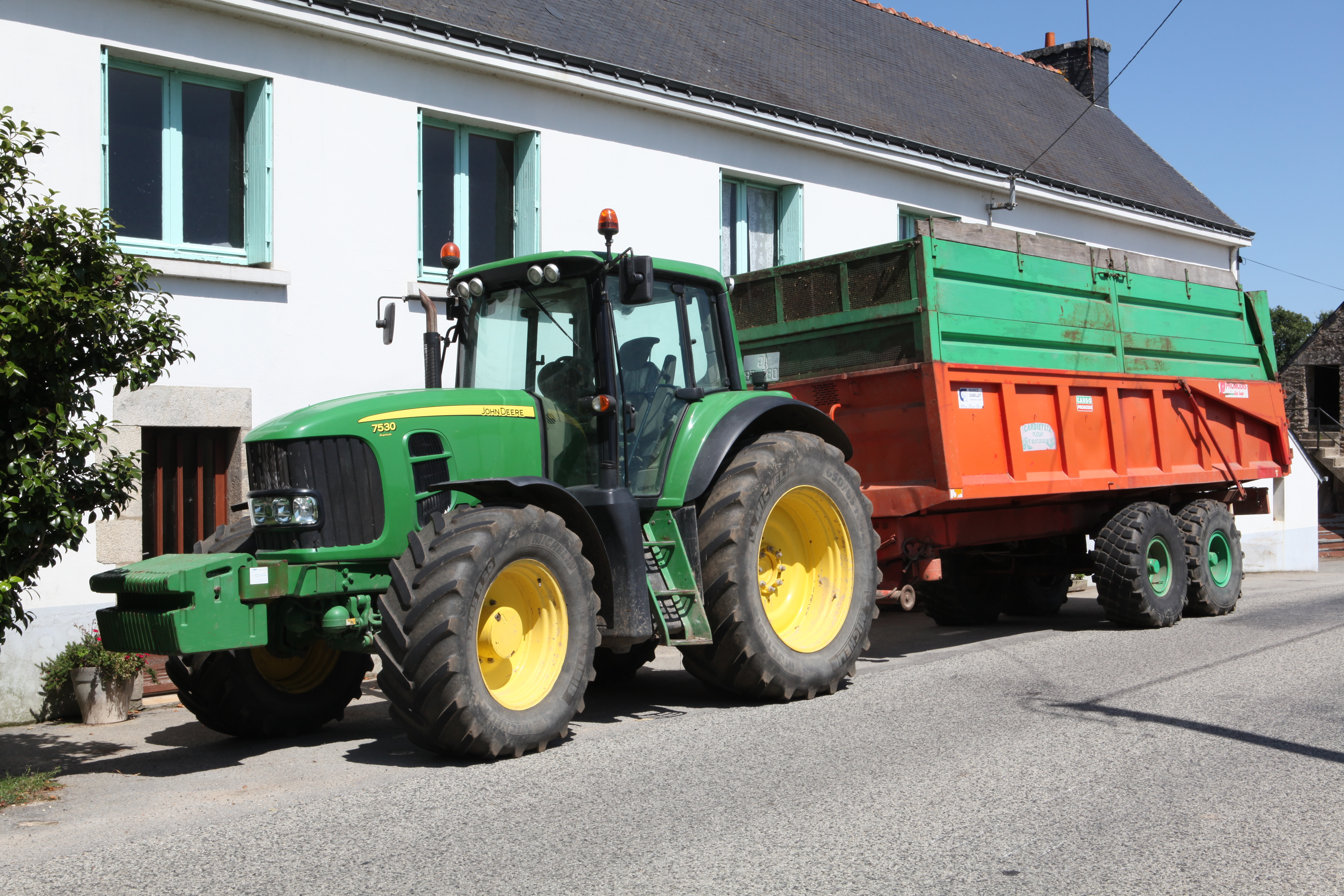
Promodis trailer, IJmuiden

In 1984, several FIAT dealers decided to create a wholesale cooperative to improve their purchase prices.

In 2000, PROMODIS, via its wholesaler CENTRADIS, acquired the wholesaler and manufacturer of agricultural spare parts AGRIEST in the Haute-Saône of Eastern France.

In 2006, the network already had 115 members in France, Spain, and Luxembourg, for a total of 300 "points of sale" employing 1,900 people, for "an economic weight of 915 million euros". The network was also developed in Poland in 2004.

In 2007, the network was composed of "132 members of which 107 in France, 21 in Spain and a presence in Belgium, Lithuania and Poland".

In 2009, the network had 410 points of sale in France with 2,000 employees and a turnover of about 1 billion euros. The company also expanded to Spain, Poland, Luxembourg, Switzerland and Lithuania.

The corporation has launched an operation in May 2012 to reorganize and modernize its points of sale in addition to the presentation of the new internet site.
