= Dry, Loiret =

Dry
- Commune
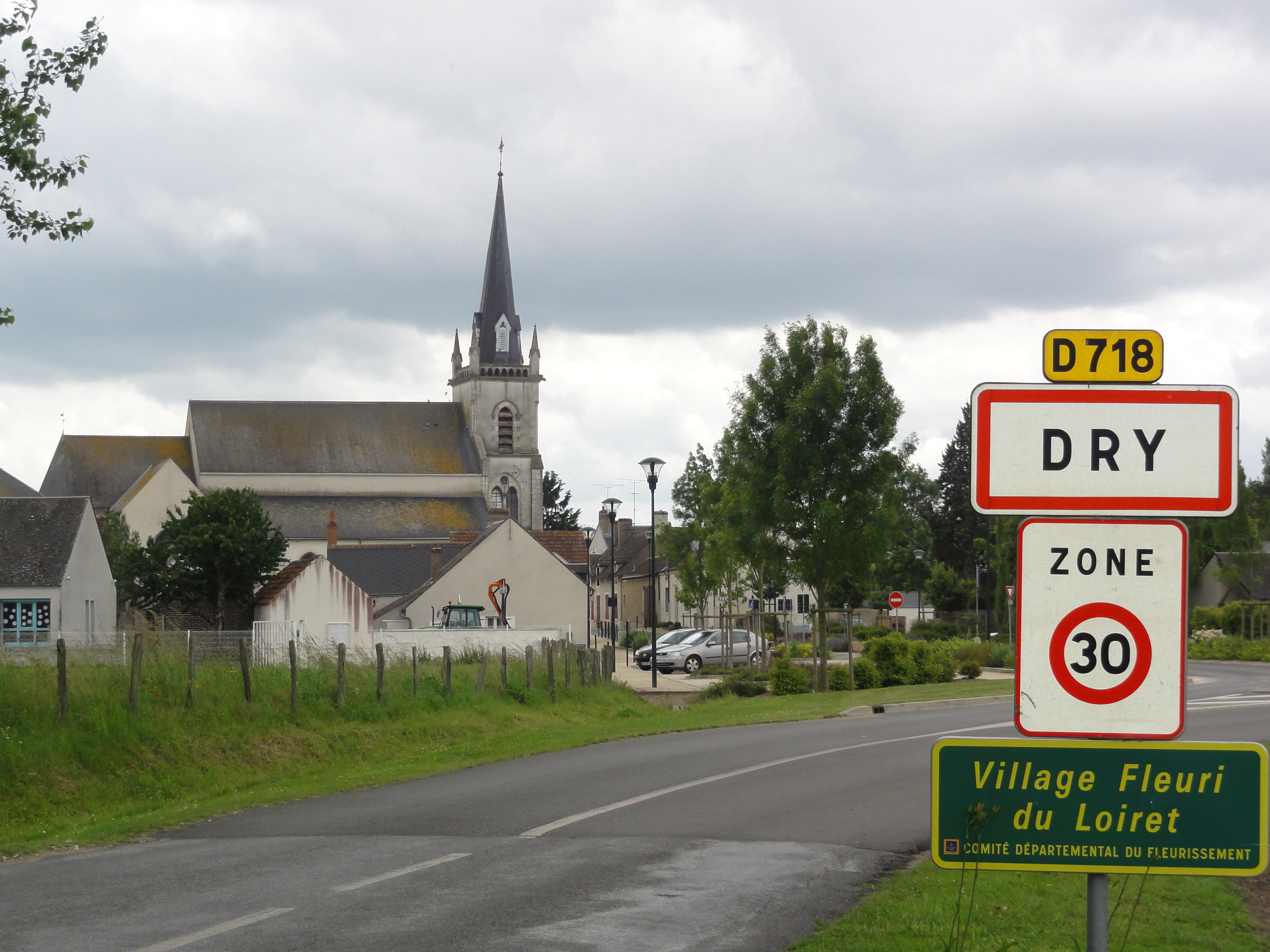
- The church and the road into Dry
- Location of Dry
- Location within France Location within Centre-Val de Loire
- Coordinates: 47°47′51″N 1°42′52″E
- Country: France
- Region: Centre-Val de Loire
- Department: Loiret
- Arrondissement: Orléans
- Canton: Beaugency
- Intercommunality: Terres du Val de Loire

Government
  - Mayor (2020–2026): Jean-Marie Cornière
- Area^{1}: 22.64 km^{2} (8.74 sq mi)
- Highest elevation: 105 m (344 ft)
- Lowest elevation: 82 m (269 ft)
- Population (2023): 1,408
  - Density: 62.19/km^{2} (161.1/sq mi)
- Demonym: Dryssois
- Time zone: UTC+01:00 (CET)
  - Summer (DST): UTC+02:00 (CEST)
- INSEE/Postal code: 45130 /45370
- ^{1} French Land Register data, which excludes lakes, ponds, glaciers > 1 km^{2} (0.386 sq mi or 247 acres) and river estuaries.

Dry (French pronunciation: [dʁi]) is a commune in the Loiret department in north-central France.

== See also ==
- Communes of the Loiret department
