= Baccon =

- Commune
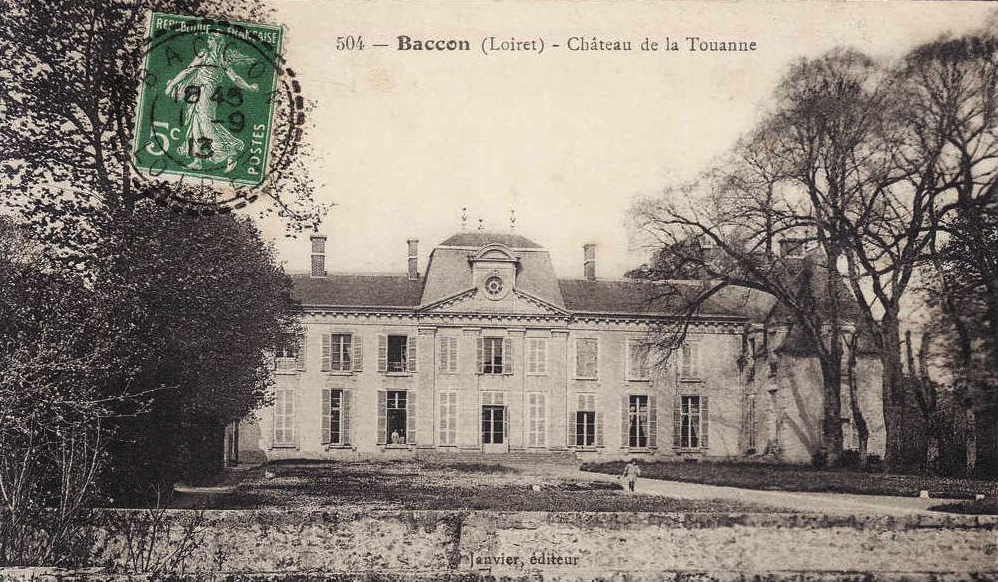
- An old postcard view of the Château de la Touanne, in Baccon
- Location of Baccon
- Location within France Location within Centre-Val de Loire
- Coordinates: 47°53′31″N 1°37′46″E
- Country: France
- Region: Centre-Val de Loire
- Department: Loiret
- Arrondissement: Orléans
- Canton: Beaugency
- Intercommunality: Terres du Val de Loire

Government
  - Mayor (2020–2026): Anita Benier
- Area^{1}: 33.02 km^{2} (12.75 sq mi)
- Highest elevation: 131 m (430 ft)
- Lowest elevation: 99 m (325 ft)
- Population (2023): 654
  - Density: 19.8/km^{2} (51.3/sq mi)
- Time zone: UTC+01:00 (CET)
  - Summer (DST): UTC+02:00 (CEST)
- INSEE/Postal code: 45019 /45130
- ^{1} French Land Register data, which excludes lakes, ponds, glaciers > 1 km^{2} (0.386 sq mi or 247 acres) and river estuaries.

Baccon (French pronunciation: [bakɔ̃]) is a commune in the Loiret department in north-central France.

== Population ==
Historical population
Year	Pop.	±% p.a.
1968	431	—
1975	433	+0.07%
1982	517	+2.57%
1990	568	+1.18%
1999	629	+1.14%
2007	656	+0.53%
2012	723	+1.96%
2017	690	−0.93%
2023	654	−0.89%
Source: INSEE

== Heritage ==
The Chappe telegraph is one of the most famous building in Baccon. It is located near the Saint-Quentin church, in the center of the town and was constructed in 1823.

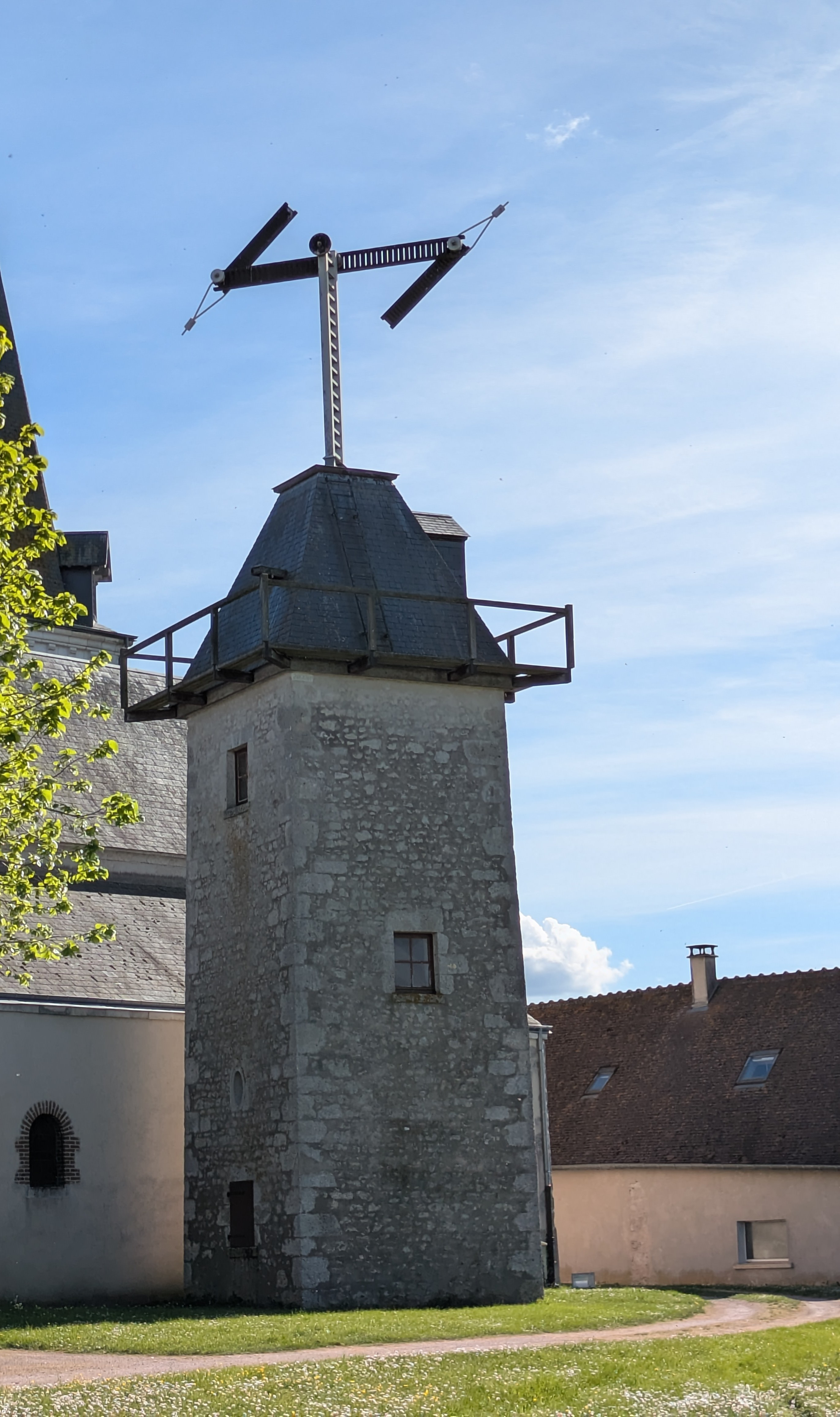
The Chappe Tower located in Baccon (Loiret, France)

== See also ==
- Communes of the Loiret department
