= Pinot Meunier =

Variety of grape

- Grape (Vitis)
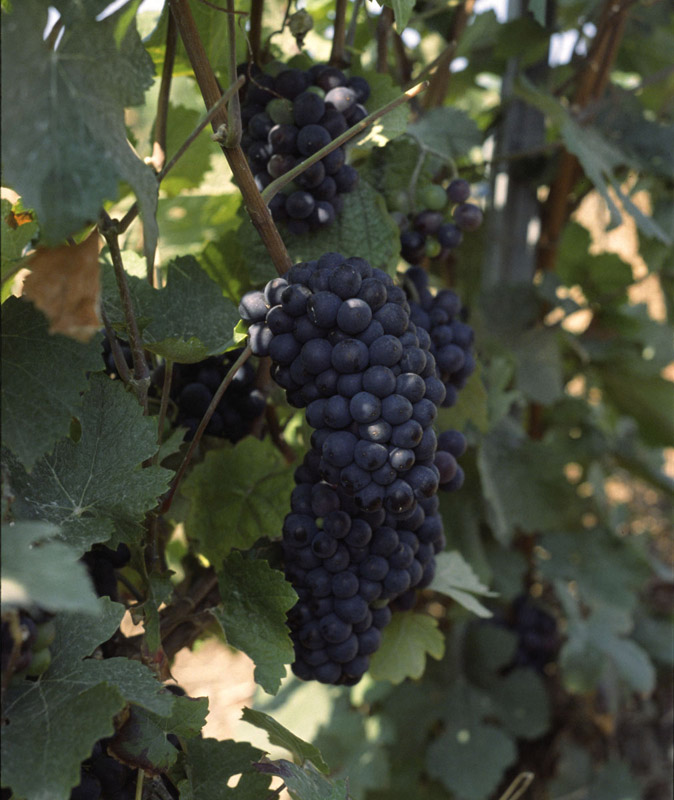
- Pinot Meunier grapes in Champagne
- Color of berry skin: Noir
- Species: Vitis vinifera
- Also called: Meunier, Schwarzriesling, Müllerrebe, Miller's Burgundy
- Origin: France
- Notable regions: Champagne (France), Württemberg (Germany), Oregon (USA), Okanagan Valley (British Columbia, Canada), Carneros AVA (USA)
- Notable wines: Champagne, Soaring Eagles (Lang Estates) Okanagan Valley
- VIVC number: 9278

Pinot Meunier (English: /ˌpiːnoʊ mənˈjeɪ/, French: [pino mønje]), also known as Meunier or Schwarzriesling (German: [ˈʃvaʁt͡sˌʁiːslɪŋ]), is a variety of red wine grape most noted for being one of the three main varieties used in the production of Champagne (the other two are the red variety Pinot noir and the white Chardonnay). Until recently, producers in Champagne generally did not acknowledge Pinot Meunier, preferring to emphasise the use of the other noble varieties, but now Pinot Meunier is gaining recognition for the body and richness it contributes to Champagne. Pinot Meunier is approximately one-third of all the grapes planted in Champagne. It is a chimeric mutation of Pinot: its inner cell layers are composed of a Pinot genotype which is close to Pinot noir or Pinot gris; the outer, epidermal, layer is, however, made up of a mutant, distinctive, genotype. Pinot Meunier was first mentioned in the 16th century, and gets its name and synonyms (French Meunier and German Müller—both meaning miller) from flour-like dusty white down on the underside of its leaves.

== Ampelography ==
Pinot Meunier can be identified by ampelographers by its indented leaves that appear downy white, like flour has been dusted liberally on the underside, and lightly on the upper side, of the leaf. The name "Meunier" comes from the French word for miller with many of the grapevine's synonyms (see below) also hearkening to this association—such as "Dusty Miller" which is used in England, "Farineaux" and "Noirin Enfariné" used in France as well as "Müllerrebe" and "Müller-Traube" used in Germany. This characteristic derives from large numbers of fine white hairs on the leaves. However, some clones of Pinot Meunier have been found to be completely hairless—a chimeric mutation, in fact—which has led ampelographers to more closely draw a link between Meunier and Pinot noir.

In research, Paul K. Boss and Mark R. Thomas of the CSIRO Plant Industry and Cooperative Research Centre for Viticulture in Glen Osmond, Australia, found that Pinot Meunier has a mutation (VvGAI1) that stops it from responding to gibberellic acid, a plant growth hormone. This leads to different, white-haired, leaf and shoot growth, and also to a slight stunting in growth, explaining why Pinot Meunier plants tend to be a bit smaller than Pinot noir. The mutation exists only in the outermost cell layer of the cultivar, the L1 or 'epidermal' layer, meaning Pinot Meunier is a chimera. Through tissue culture, it is thus possible to separate out plants containing both the mutant (L1) and non-mutant (L2) genotypes, yielding a normal Pinot noir -like genotype and an unusual looking L1-genotype vine with compressed internodes and thickly clustered leaves. The mutants could not produce full-grown tendrils, it seems that gibberellic acid converts grapevine flower buds into tendrils.

== Wine regions ==
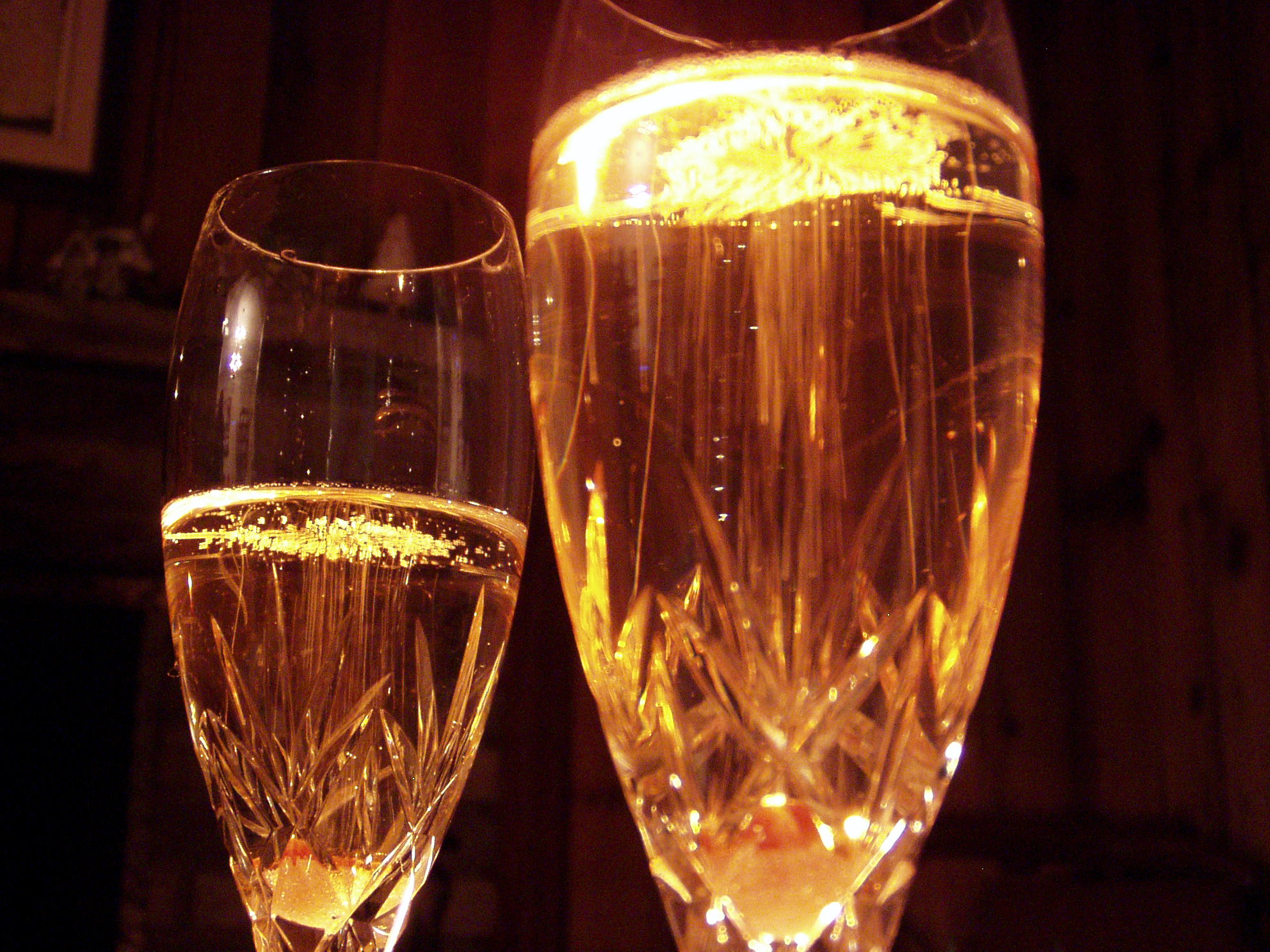
Pinot Meunier is often used in the production of sparkling wine and is one of the three primary grapes allowed in Champagne.

Pinot Meunier is one of the most widely planted grapes in France but it is rather obscure to most wine drinkers and will rarely be seen on a wine label. The grape has been favored by vine growers in northern France due to its ability to bud and ripen more reliably than Pinot noir. The vine's tendency to bud later in the growing season and ripen earlier makes it less susceptible to developing coulure which can greatly reduce a prospective crop. For the last couple of centuries, Pinot Meunier has been the most widely planted Champagne grape, accounting for more than 40% of the region's entire plantings. It is most prevalent in the cooler, north facing vineyards of the Vallee de la Marne and in the Aisne department. It is also widely grown in the Aube region in vineyards where Pinot noir and Chardonnay would not fully ripen.

Compared to Pinot noir, Pinot Meunier produces lighter colored wines with slightly higher acid levels but can maintain similar sugar and alcohol levels. As part of a standard Champagne blend, Pinot Meunier contributes aromatics and fruity flavors to the wine. Champagnes with a substantial proportion of Pinot Meunier tend not to have as much significant aging potential as Champagnes that are composed primarily of Chardonnay or Pinot noir. It is therefore most commonly used for Champagnes that are intended to be consumed young, when the soft, plushy fruit of the Pinot Meunier is at its peak. A notable exception is the Champagne house of Krug which makes liberal use of Pinot Meunier in its long-lived prestige cuvees.

During the 19th century, Pinot Meunier was widely planted throughout northern France, especially in the Paris Basin. It was found across the northern half of country from the Loire Valley to Lorraine. Today, Pinot Meunier is found outside of Champagne in dwindling quantities in the Loire Valley regions of Touraine and Orleans as well as the Cotes de Toul and Moselle regions. In these regions Pinot Meunier is used to make light bodied reds and rosés. These wines most often fall into the vin gris style are characterized by their pale pink color and distinctive smoky notes.

=== Other regions ===
In Germany, Pinot Meunier is used most often to make still red wines under its synonyms Schwarzriesling, Müllerrebe and Müller-Traube. The style of those wines ranges from simple, light, off-dry (halbtrocken) to rich, dry with substantial flavors. More recently, Schwarzriesling is used also to make dry white wines with a fresh, fruity character. Most German plantings of the variety (1,795 hectares (4,440 acres) out of 2,424 hectares (5,990 acres), or 74%, in the year 2006) are found in Württemberg. Here it is used to make a local speciality known as Schillerwein which is characterized by its light pink color, smoky noted and slightly higher acidity than wines made from Spätburgunder (Pinot noir). Some growers in Württemberg have been promoting a particular clone of Pinot Meunier that has developed in the region known as Samtrot. Pinot Meunier is also found in significant quantities in the German wine regions of Baden, Franconia and Palatinate. Despite the variety's connection with Champagne, it only recently become popular to use Schwarzriesling in the production of sparkling wines Sekt, often not blended with its Champagne partners but as pure brut Schwarzriesling "Sekt". Pinot Meunier is also grown in the German-speaking parts of Switzerland and in small quantities in Austria.

In California, American sparkling wine producers wishing to emulate the Champagne method began planting Pinot Meunier in the 1980s. Today most of the state's plantings are located in the Carneros AVA. Bouchaine Vineyards, Mumm Napa and Domaine Chandon are a few wineries in all of the Napa Valley to produce a still Pinot Meunier. In Australia, the grape has had a longer history in Australian wine production than Pinot noir. In the Grampians region of Victoria, Pinot Meunier was known at one time as Miller's Burgundy and used to make still red varietal wine. In the late 20th century plantings were starting to decline until a revival of Champagne-style sparkling wine took hold in the 2000s which sparked renewed interest in Pinot Meunier. The New Zealand wine industry has recently discovered Pinot Meunier for both still & sparkling wine production. As a varietal red wine, Pinot Meunier tends to produce slightly jammy, fruity wines with moderate acidity and low tannins.

== Possible relationships ==
Ferdinand Regner has proposed that Pinot Meunier (Schwarzriesling) is a parent of Pinot noir but this work has not been replicated and would appear to be superseded by the Australian work.

The Wrotham (pronounced "rootum") Pinot is an English selection of Pinot that is sometimes regarded as a synonym of Pinot Meunier. The Wrotham Pinot does look somewhat similar to Meunier, with white hairs on the upper surface of the leaves. But it is particularly resistant to disease, has a higher natural sugar content and ripens two weeks earlier than Meunier. No genetic evidence exists however to prove it is anything other than a distinctively named clone of Pinot Meunier.

== Synonyms ==
Pinot Meunier is known under various synonyms across the globe including-Auvernat Meunier, Blanc Meunier, Blanche Feuille, Carpinet, Cerny Mancujk, Créedinet, Dusty Miller, Farineux noir, Fernaise, Frésillon, Fromenté, Frühe blaue Müllerrebe, Goujeau, Gris Meunier, Meunier, Meunier Gris, Miller Grape, Miller's Burgundy, Molnár Töke, Molnár Töke Kék, Molnárszölö, Morillon Tacone, Morone Farinaccio, Moucnik, Müllerrebe, Muller-Traube, Noirin Enfariné, Noirien de Vuillapans, Pineau Meunier, Pino Meine, Pinot negro, Plant de Brie, Plant Meunier, Plant Munier, Postitschtraube, Rana Modra Mlinaria, Rana Modra Mlinarica, Resseau, Riesling noir, Sarpinet, Trézillon and Wrotham Pinot.

== See also ==
- Pixie Grape, natural dwarf grapevine that is derived from the Pinot Meunier.
