= Canton of Beaugency =

Coordinates: 47.78°N 1.63°E

The canton of Beaugency is an administrative division of the Loiret department, central France. Its borders were modified at the French canton reorganisation which came into effect in March 2015. Its seat is in Beaugency.

It consists of the following communes:

1. Baccon
2. Baule
3. Beaugency
4. Cléry-Saint-André
5. Cravant
6. Dry
7. Jouy-le-Potier
8. Lailly-en-Val
9. Mareau-aux-Prés
10. Messas
11. Mézières-lez-Cléry
12. Tavers
13. Villorceau
