= Michèle Desbordes =

French writer (1940–2006)

Michèle Desbordes (4 August 1940 in Saint-Cyr-en-Val, Loiret – 24 January 2006 in Baule, Loiret) was a French writer. A curator of university libraries, she received several awards for her story La Demande devoted to Leonardo da Vinci.

== Biography ==
After studying literature at the Sorbonne, she became a curator in libraries in Parisian universities, then in Guadeloupe in public readings. In 1994, she was appointed director of the University Library of Orléans. From her home in Baule she wrote poems and novels.

== Works ==
- 1986: Sombres dans la ville où elles se taisent (poetry), Arcane 17
- 1997: L'Habituée, Éditions Verdier
- 1999: La Demande, Verdier
- 2000: Le Commandement, Gallimard
- 2001: Le Lit de la mer, Gallimard
- 2004: La Robe bleue, Verdier, inspired by the story of Camille Claudel
- 2004: Dans le temps qu'il marchait, éditions Laurence Teper
- 2005: Un été de glycine, Verdier
- 2006: L'Emprise, Verdier
- 2006: Artemisia et autres proses, éditions Laurence Teper
- 2008: Les Petites Terres, éditions Verdier

== Distinctions ==
For her work La Demande, 1999.:

- Prix du roman France Télévisions 1999
- Prix du Jury Jean-Giono 1999
- Prix des auditeurs de la RTBF 1999
- Flaiano Literary Prize 2001
