= Pixie Grape =

Variety of grape

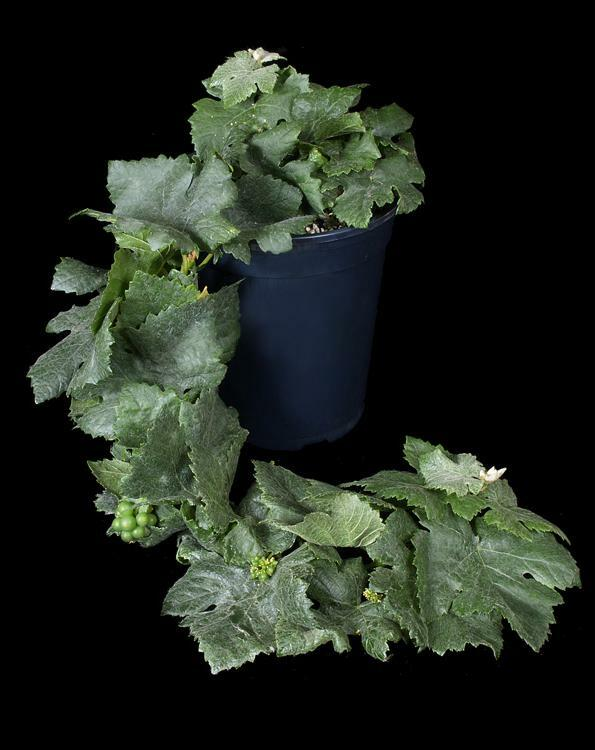
Pinot Meunier

The Pixie Grape is a new type of Vitis vinifera cultivar. The Pixie is a natural dwarf grapevine that is derived from the periclinal L1/L2 chimera Pinot Meunier. These dwarf grapevines tend to have short internodes and prefer to grow flowers instead of tendrils. They grow from 1 foot to 2 feet in height and produce clusters with a size on average of 4 inches. It is simple to cultivate in greenhouses and grows year round. Its purpose was to create an easy tool with which to conduct grapevine research. The grape was developed by grape rootstock breeder Dr. Peter Cousins of the USDA and David Tricoli of the Plant Transformation Facility, University of California Davis.

== Description ==
=== Flowering ===
The Pixie is a unique grape in that its size is the most important part of its genotype and phenotype. It usually only grows up to about 2 feet in height and does not usually span out in horizontal growth. Internodes on a Pixie are about 25% the length of the Pinot Meunier chimeras length. Flowering is constant on a vine that is still alive and it is not uncommon to view all types of flowering from buds all the way up to ripe fruit just on one vine. Pixies do not grow tendrils however, instead they grow inflorescences (group or cluster of flowers).

=== Fruit ===
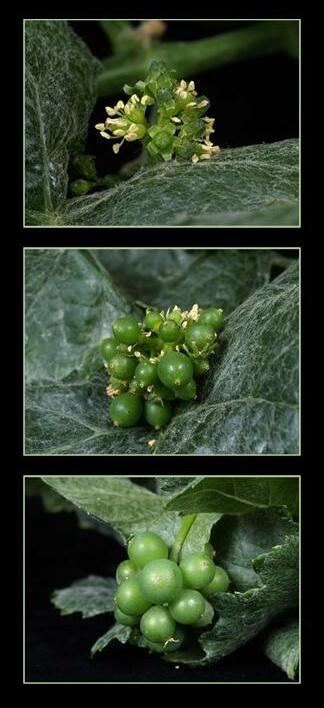
Pixie Grape berries.

Fruit can be obtained all year round from the Pixie. The Pixie's fruit is a black fruited grape with seeds in it. Cluster length usually maxes out at 10 cm in length and the vines that are not regularly thinned tend to grow a lot of fruit and in turn slow growth and reduce the number of flowers produced. Seeds can be obtained and there have been known results of seedlings growing and showing flowers. However, due to a reduced sensitivity to gibberellins a Gibberellic Acid treatment is necessary when undergoing seed germination.

== Propagation ==
The Propagation process started with the Pinot Meunier chimera. Unopened flower buds were taken and the anthers were isolated on a medium to create embryogenic callus cultures. Then they were grown into plants where they tissue cultured acclimated to soil and then moved to a greenhouse. Grown under all day artificial light. Once grown pollen was obtained where it was cultured on vines from the vineyard. Seeds were then treated with 1.5% hydrogen peroxide for 24 hrs, 1000 ppm GA3 for one day, after that was three months of moist stratification, then treated with 5000 ppm GA3 for one day before being placed in an incubator at 29.3 °C. These seeds were then treated normally grown and grew into mature plants.

== Uses ==
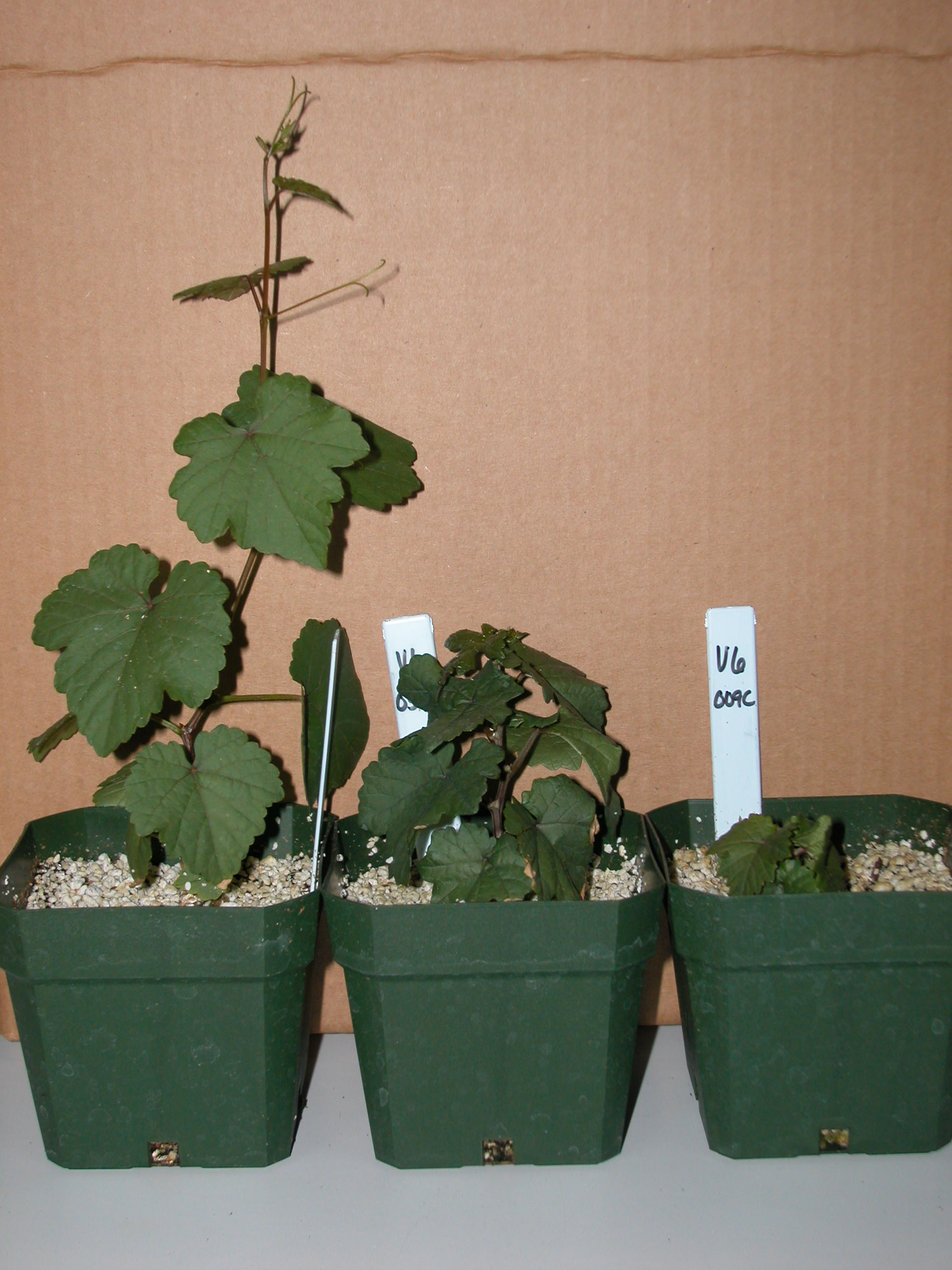
Potted Pixie Grapes

The primary use of the Pixie is for research. The intent of scientists when propagating and obtaining this dwarf was to provide a grapevine that was suited to expedite viticulture and other areas of grapevine research. These grapevines are vastly reduced in size so they can easily be grown in a pot in the greenhouse. This allows for year-round growth and flowering which in turn provides researchers to study flowering continuously throughout the year. It is also believed that the Pixies may be used to speed up backcrossing or pseudobackcrossing. Teaching and studying grape growth, development and morphology at any times of the year is made possible by being able to obtain grapes of any age at any time of the year no matter the weather outside because it is grown in a protected environment. Interactions with diseases can also be studied more in depth and also berry development. Not having to cope with a 2–3-month window in the summer to obtain your data, you can now have access to it year around. With this plant you can study any topic from genetics to pathology to physiology all year round and obtain a plethora of more information.
