= Villorceau =

- Commune
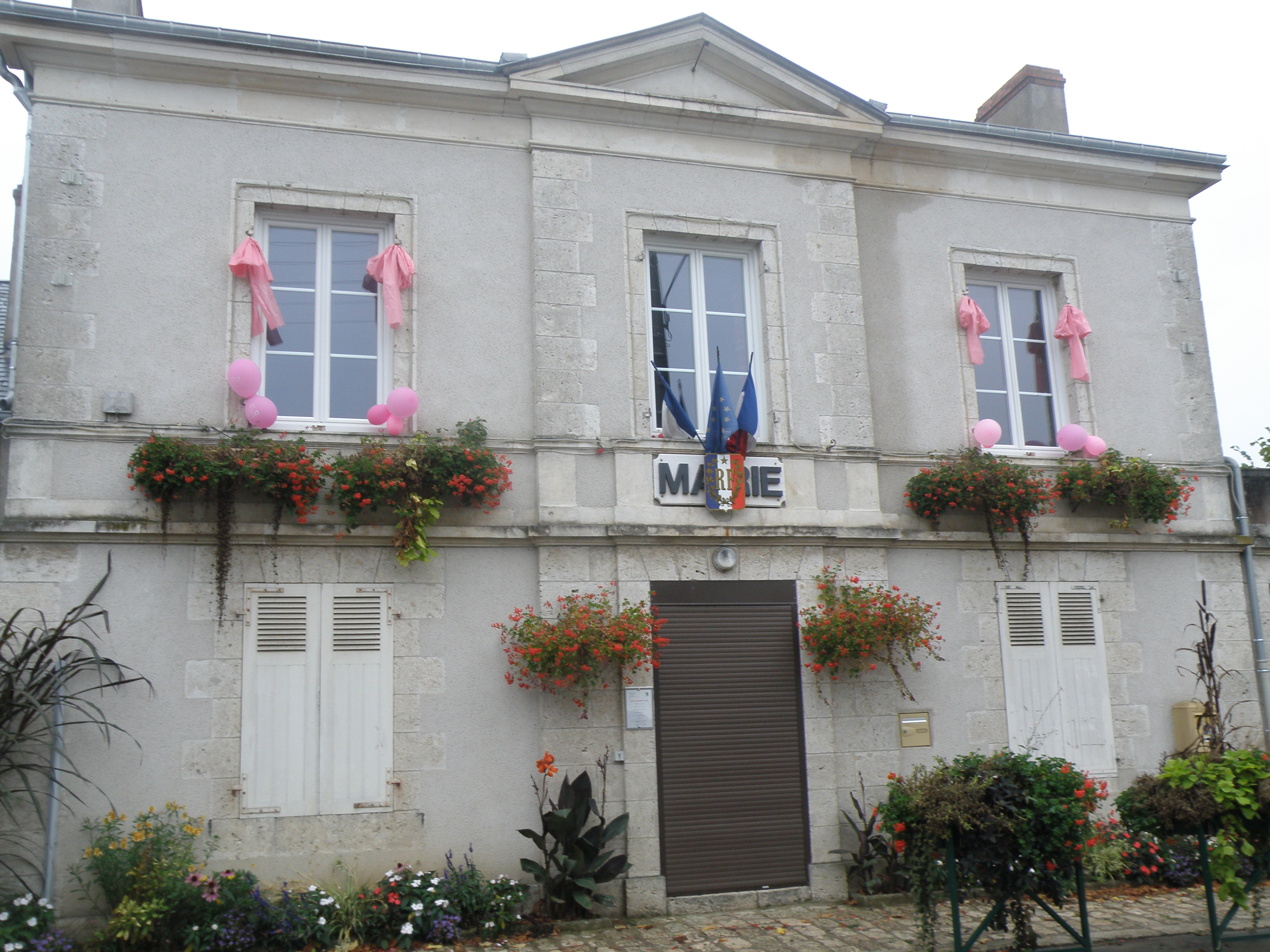
- The town hall in Villorceau
- Location of Villorceau
- Location within France Location within Centre-Val de Loire
- Coordinates: 47°48′01″N 1°35′52″E
- Country: France
- Region: Centre-Val de Loire
- Department: Loiret
- Arrondissement: Orléans
- Canton: Beaugency

Government
  - Mayor (2020–2026): Daniel Thouvenin
- Area^{1}: 9.5 km^{2} (3.7 sq mi)
- Highest elevation: 121 m (397 ft)
- Lowest elevation: 104 m (341 ft)
- Population (2023): 1,084
  - Density: 110/km^{2} (300/sq mi)
- Time zone: UTC+01:00 (CET)
  - Summer (DST): UTC+02:00 (CEST)
- INSEE/Postal code: 45344 /45190
- ^{1} French Land Register data, which excludes lakes, ponds, glaciers > 1 km^{2} (0.386 sq mi or 247 acres) and river estuaries.

Villorceau (French pronunciation: [vilɔʁso]) is a commune in the Loiret department in north-central France.

== Demographics ==
Historical population
Year	Pop.	±% p.a.
1962	311	—
1968	346	+1.79%
1975	380	+1.35%
1982	754	+10.28%
1990	839	+1.34%
1999	907	+0.87%
2007	1,053	+1.88%
2012	1,160	+1.95%
2017	1,132	−0.49%
2023	1,084	−0.72%
Source: Cassini and INSEE

== See also ==
- Communes of the Loiret department
