= Lailly-en-Val =

- Commune
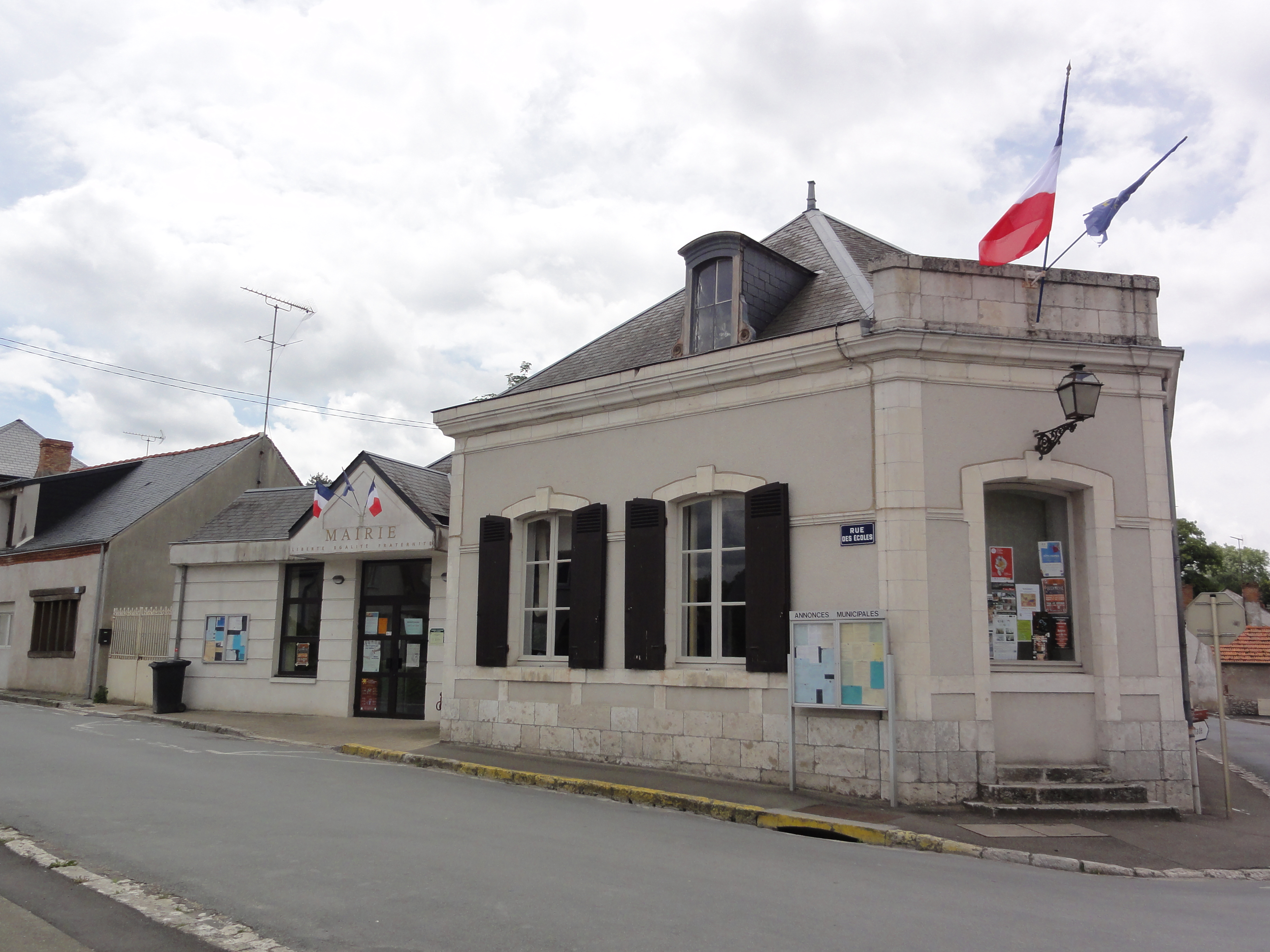
- The town hall in Lailly-en-Val
- Location of Lailly-en-Val
- Location within France Location within Centre-Val de Loire
- Coordinates: 47°46′14″N 1°41′14″E
- Country: France
- Region: Centre-Val de Loire
- Department: Loiret
- Arrondissement: Orléans
- Canton: Beaugency

Government
  - Mayor (2020–2026): Philippe Gaudry
- Area^{1}: 45.61 km^{2} (17.61 sq mi)
- Highest elevation: 115 m (377 ft)
- Lowest elevation: 78 m (256 ft)
- Population (2023): 3,101
  - Density: 67.99/km^{2} (176.1/sq mi)
- Time zone: UTC+01:00 (CET)
  - Summer (DST): UTC+02:00 (CEST)
- INSEE/Postal code: 45179 /45740
- ^{1} French Land Register data, which excludes lakes, ponds, glaciers > 1 km^{2} (0.386 sq mi or 247 acres) and river estuaries.

Lailly-en-Val (French pronunciation: [laji ɑ̃ val]) is a commune in the Loiret department in north-central France.

== Population ==
Historical population
Year	Pop.	±% p.a.
1968	1,311	—
1975	1,427	+1.22%
1982	1,875	+3.98%
1990	2,054	+1.15%
1999	2,251	+1.02%
2007	2,434	+0.98%
2012	2,811	+2.92%
2017	3,112	+2.06%
2023	3,101	−0.06%
Source: INSEE

== See also ==
- Communes of the Loiret department
