= Mézières-lez-Cléry =

- Commune
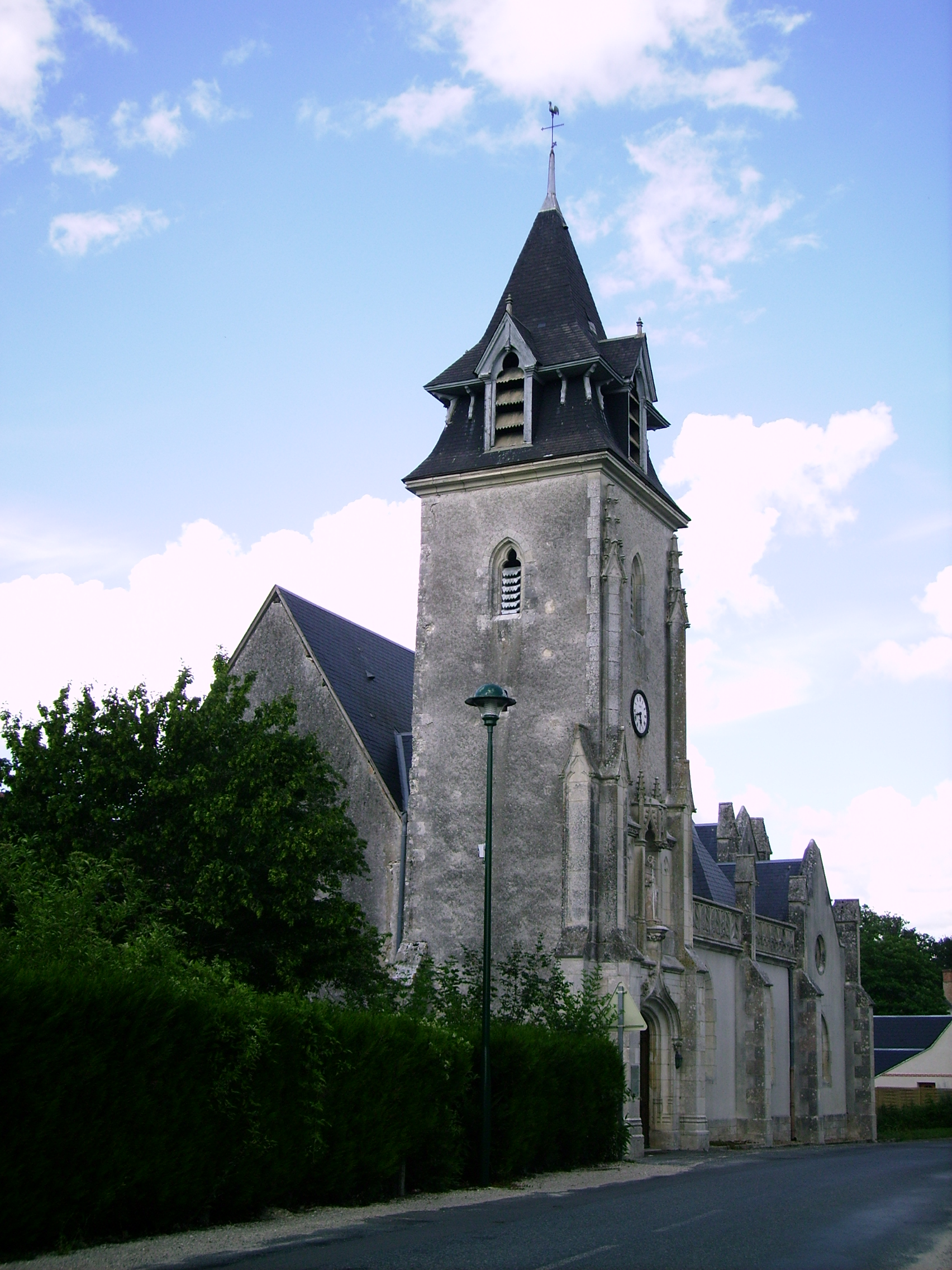
- The church in Mézières-lez-Cléry
- Location of Mézières-lez-Cléry
- Location within France Location within Centre-Val de Loire
- Coordinates: 47°49′06″N 1°48′16″E
- Country: France
- Region: Centre-Val de Loire
- Department: Loiret
- Arrondissement: Orléans
- Canton: Beaugency
- Intercommunality: Terres du Val de Loire

Government
  - Mayor (2020–2026): Romuald Genty
- Area^{1}: 27.01 km^{2} (10.43 sq mi)
- Highest elevation: 108 m (354 ft)
- Lowest elevation: 91 m (299 ft)
- Population (2023): 883
  - Density: 32.7/km^{2} (84.7/sq mi)
- Demonym: Macériens
- Time zone: UTC+01:00 (CET)
  - Summer (DST): UTC+02:00 (CEST)
- INSEE/Postal code: 45204 /45370
- ^{1} French Land Register data, which excludes lakes, ponds, glaciers > 1 km^{2} (0.386 sq mi or 247 acres) and river estuaries.

Mézières-lez-Cléry (French pronunciation: [mezjɛʁ lɛ kleʁi], literally Mézières near Cléry) is a commune in the Loiret department in north-central France.

== See also ==
- Communes of the Loiret department
