= Messas =

- Commune
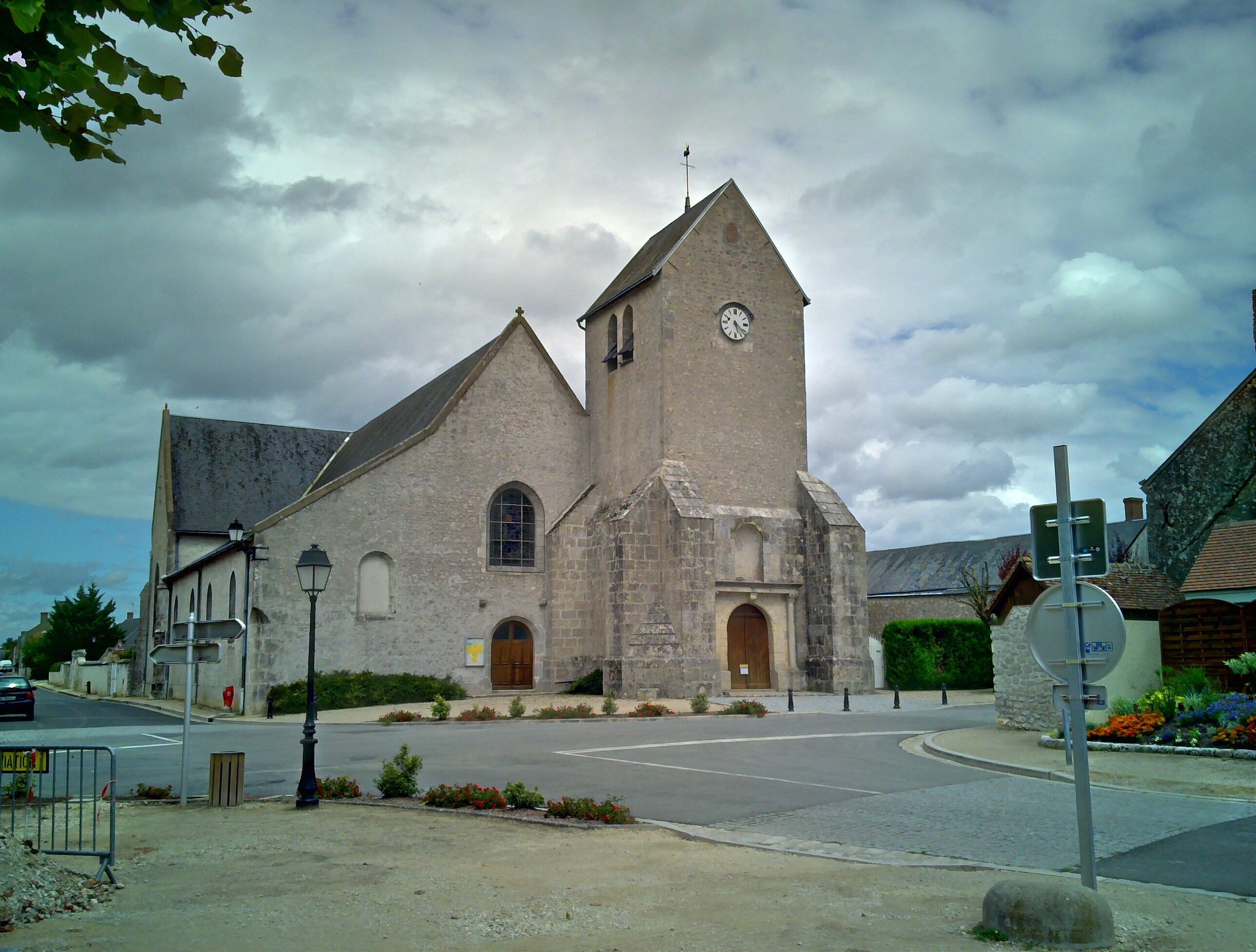
- The church in Messas
- Location of Messas
- Location within France Location within Centre-Val de Loire
- Coordinates: 47°48′31″N 1°39′20″E
- Country: France
- Region: Centre-Val de Loire
- Department: Loiret
- Arrondissement: Orléans
- Canton: Beaugency

Government
  - Mayor (2020–2026): Grégory Gonet
- Area^{1}: 5.21 km^{2} (2.01 sq mi)
- Highest elevation: 116 m (381 ft)
- Lowest elevation: 100 m (330 ft)
- Population (2023): 1,003
  - Density: 193/km^{2} (499/sq mi)
- Demonym: Messassiens
- Time zone: UTC+01:00 (CET)
  - Summer (DST): UTC+02:00 (CEST)
- INSEE/Postal code: 45202 /45190
- ^{1} French Land Register data, which excludes lakes, ponds, glaciers > 1 km^{2} (0.386 sq mi or 247 acres) and river estuaries.

Messas is a commune in the Loiret department in north-central France.

The parish church is dedicated to Saint Sebastien.

== See also ==
- Communes of the Loiret department
