= Jouy-le-Potier =

- Commune
- Coat of arms
- Location of Jouy-le-Potier
- Location within France Location within Centre-Val de Loire
- Coordinates: 47°45′10″N 1°48′37″E
- Country: France
- Region: Centre-Val de Loire
- Department: Loiret
- Arrondissement: Orléans
- Canton: Beaugency
- Intercommunality: Portes de Sologne

Government
  - Mayor (2020–2026): Gilles Billiot
- Area^{1}: 50.4 km^{2} (19.5 sq mi)
- Highest elevation: 119 m (390 ft)
- Lowest elevation: 94 m (308 ft)
- Population (2023): 1,643
  - Density: 32.6/km^{2} (84.4/sq mi)
- Demonym: Joviciens
- Time zone: UTC+01:00 (CET)
  - Summer (DST): UTC+02:00 (CEST)
- INSEE/Postal code: 45175 /45370
- Website: Site de la commune
- ^{1} French Land Register data, which excludes lakes, ponds, glaciers > 1 km^{2} (0.386 sq mi or 247 acres) and river estuaries.

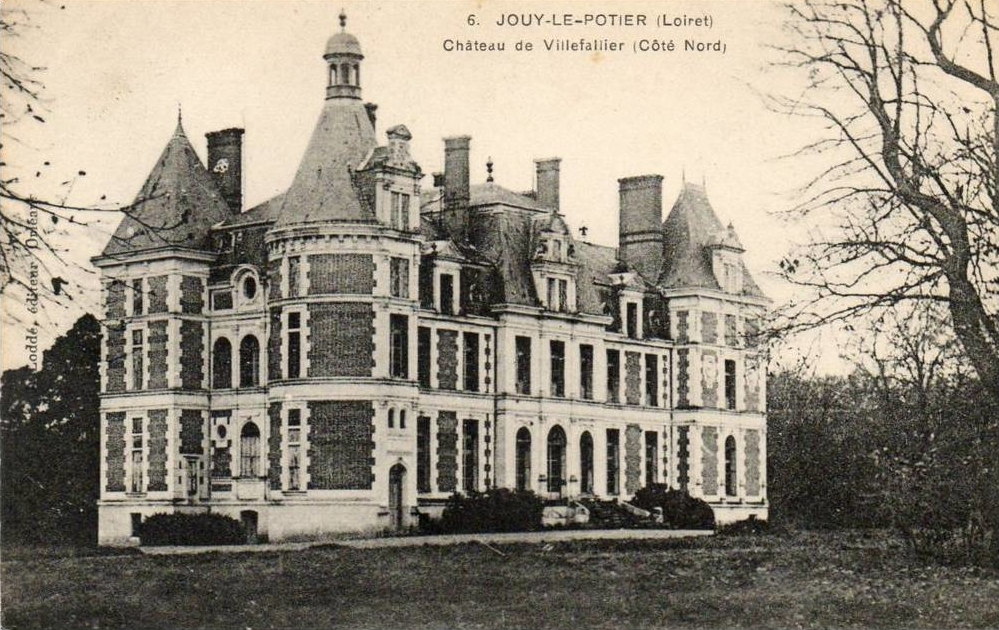
Jouy-le-Potier

Jouy-le-Potier (French pronunciation: [ʒwi lə pɔtje]) is a commune in the Loiret department in north-central France.

== See also ==
- Communes of the Loiret department
