= Baule =

- Commune
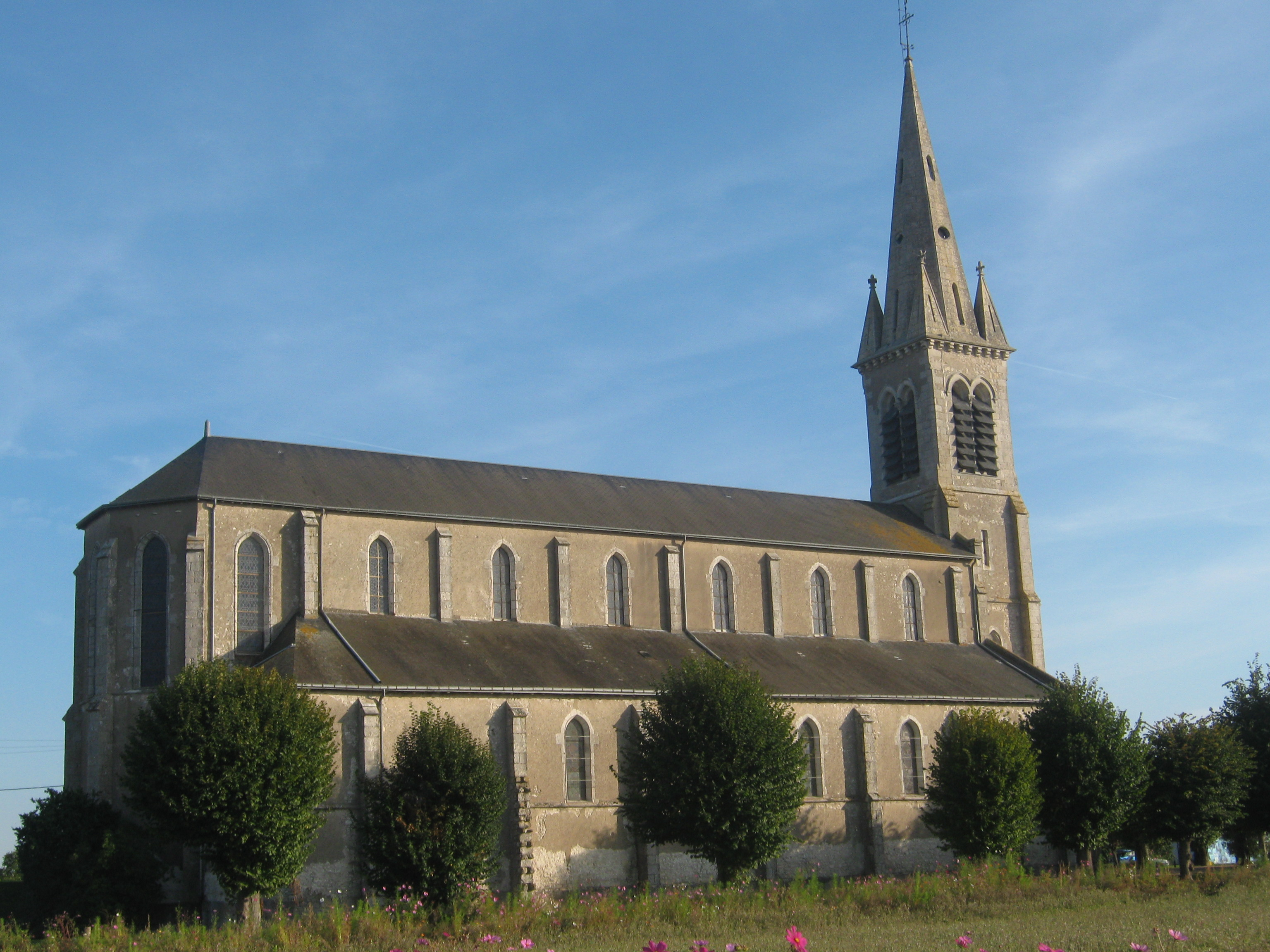
- The church in Baule
- Location of Baule
- Location within France Location within Centre-Val de Loire
- Coordinates: 47°48′42″N 1°40′18″E
- Country: France
- Region: Centre-Val de Loire
- Department: Loiret
- Arrondissement: Orléans
- Canton: Beaugency

Government
  - Mayor (2020–2026): Patrick Echegut
- Area^{1}: 12.11 km^{2} (4.68 sq mi)
- Highest elevation: 116 m (381 ft)
- Lowest elevation: 81 m (266 ft)
- Population (2023): 1,985
  - Density: 163.9/km^{2} (424.5/sq mi)
- Time zone: UTC+01:00 (CET)
  - Summer (DST): UTC+02:00 (CEST)
- INSEE/Postal code: 45024 /45130
- ^{1} French Land Register data, which excludes lakes, ponds, glaciers > 1 km^{2} (0.386 sq mi or 247 acres) and river estuaries.

Baule (French pronunciation: [bol]) is a commune in the department of Loiret, Centre-Val de Loire, France.

The writer Michèle Desbordes (1940–2006) died in Baule.

== Population ==
Historical population

Year	Pop.	±% p.a.
1793	1,625	—
1821	2,109	+0.94%
1846	2,021	−0.17%
1872	1,624	−0.84%
1901	1,272	−0.84%
1926	962	−1.11%
1946	935	−0.14%
1962	952	+0.11%
1968	1,004	+0.89%

Year	Pop.	±% p.a.
1975	1,096	+1.26%
1982	1,288	+2.33%
1990	1,457	+1.55%
1999	1,657	+1.44%
2007	1,966	+2.16%
2012	2,052	+0.86%
2017	2,073	+0.20%
2023	1,985	−0.72%

Source: EHESS and INSEE (1968-2023)

== See also ==
- Communes of the Loiret department
