= Cravant, Loiret =

Cravant
- Commune
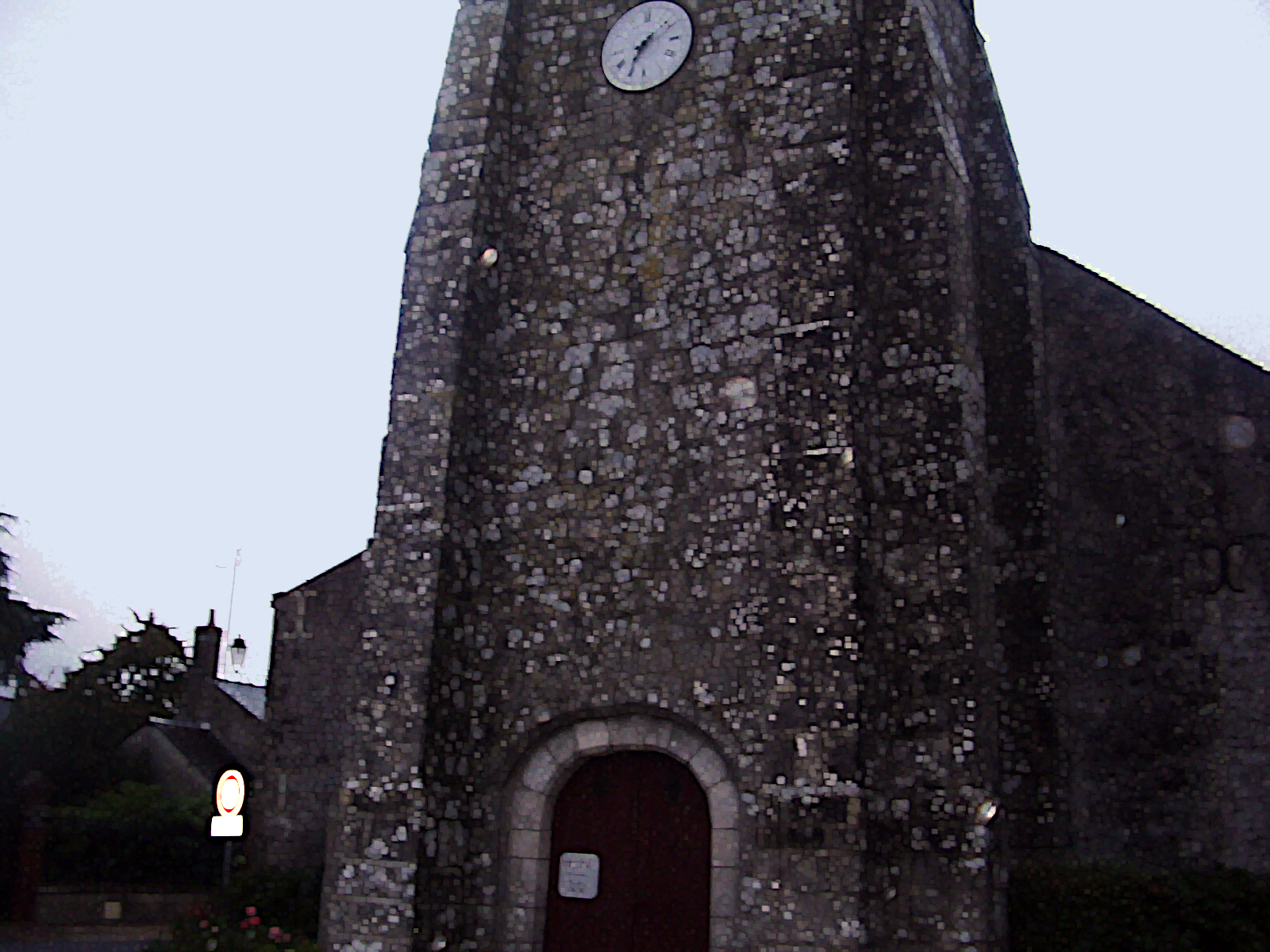
- The church in Cravant

- Coat of arms
- Location of Cravant
- Location within France Location within Centre-Val de Loire
- Coordinates: 47°49′44″N 1°34′26″E
- Country: France
- Region: Centre-Val de Loire
- Department: Loiret
- Arrondissement: Orléans
- Canton: Beaugency
- Intercommunality: Terres du Val de Loire

Government
  - Mayor (2020–2026): Serge Villoteau
- Area^{1}: 33.90 km^{2} (13.09 sq mi)
- Elevation: 118 m (387 ft)
- Population (2023): 946
  - Density: 27.9/km^{2} (72.3/sq mi)
- Demonym: Cravantais
- Time zone: UTC+01:00 (CET)
  - Summer (DST): UTC+02:00 (CEST)
- INSEE/Postal code: 45116 /45190
- ^{1} French Land Register data, which excludes lakes, ponds, glaciers > 1 km^{2} (0.386 sq mi or 247 acres) and river estuaries.

Cravant (French pronunciation: [kʁavɑ̃]) is a commune in the Loiret department in north-central France.

== See also ==
- Communes of the Loiret department
