= Mareau-aux-Prés =

- Commune
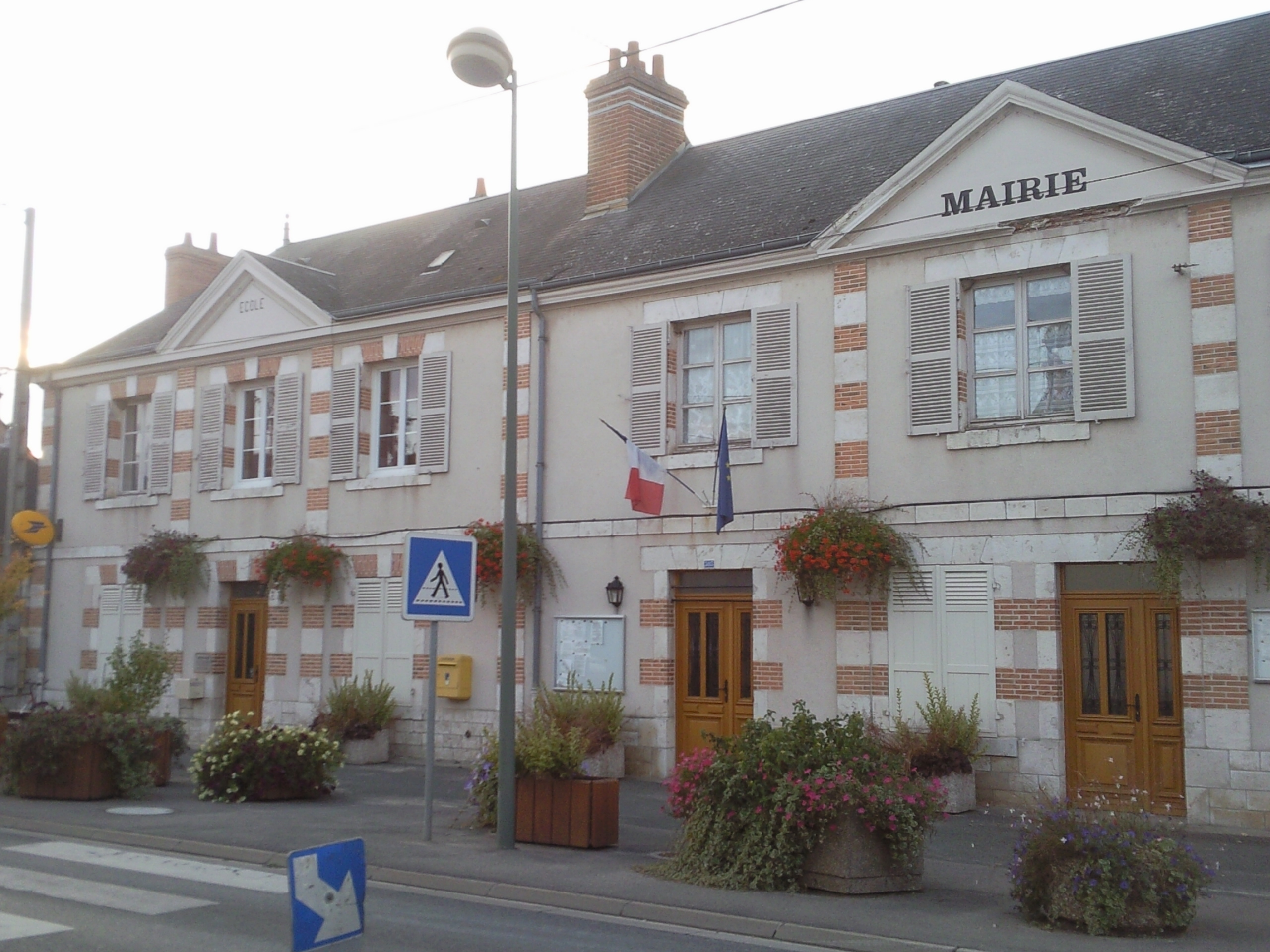
- The town hall in Mareau-aux-Prés
- Location of Mareau-aux-Prés
- Location within France Location within Centre-Val de Loire
- Coordinates: 47°50′52″N 1°48′01″E
- Country: France
- Region: Centre-Val de Loire
- Department: Loiret
- Arrondissement: Orléans
- Canton: Beaugency
- Intercommunality: Terres du Val de Loire

Government
  - Mayor (2020–2026): Bertrand Hauchecorne
- Area^{1}: 13.34 km^{2} (5.15 sq mi)
- Highest elevation: 103 m (338 ft)
- Lowest elevation: 82 m (269 ft)
- Population (2023): 1,669
  - Density: 125.1/km^{2} (324.0/sq mi)
- Demonym: Mareprésiens
- Time zone: UTC+01:00 (CET)
  - Summer (DST): UTC+02:00 (CEST)
- INSEE/Postal code: 45196 /45370
- Website: www.mareauauxpres.com
- ^{1} French Land Register data, which excludes lakes, ponds, glaciers > 1 km^{2} (0.386 sq mi or 247 acres) and river estuaries.

Mareau-aux-Prés (French pronunciation: [maʁo o pʁe]) is a commune in the Loiret department in north-central France, situated 13 km south west of the city of Orléans.

The first records of the commune date back to the 10th century, when it went by the Latin name of Marolaium or Marogilium.

It includes the hamlets of Saint-Fiacre and Trépoix. Trépoix has the remains of a 13th-century castle.

Mareau has always been an agricultural community and today is known for producing Orléans and Orléans-Cléry AOC wines.

As of January 2012, the Mayor is Bertrand Hauchecorne.

== See also ==
- Communes of the Loiret department
