= Saint-Cyr-en-Val =

- Commune
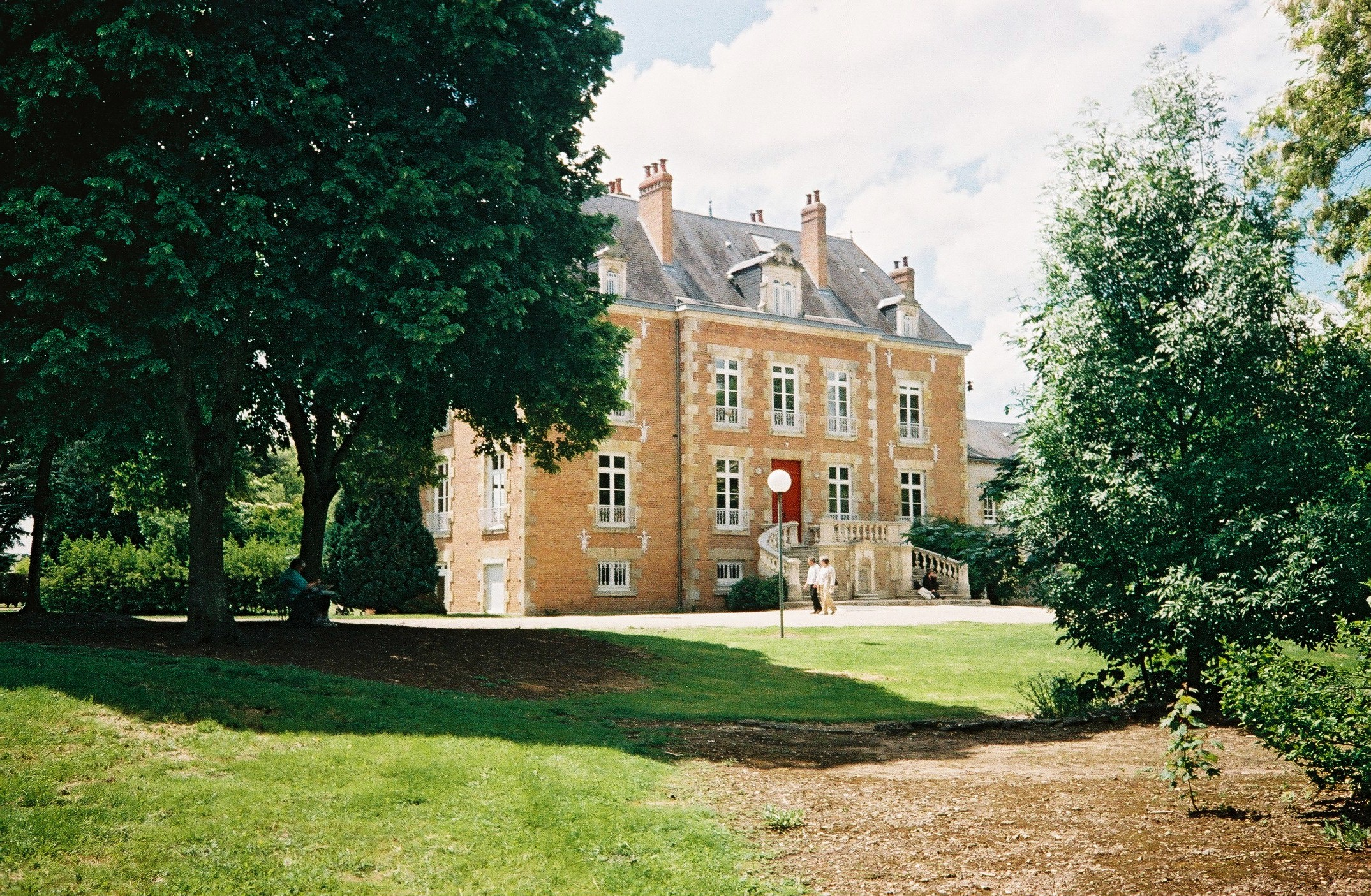
- Château de la Motte

- Coat of arms
- Location of Saint-Cyr-en-Val
- Location within France Location within Centre-Val de Loire
- Coordinates: 47°49′51″N 1°58′13″E
- Country: France
- Region: Centre-Val de Loire
- Department: Loiret
- Arrondissement: Orléans
- Canton: La Ferté-Saint-Aubin
- Intercommunality: Orléans Métropole

Government
  - Mayor (2020–2026): Vincent Michaut
- Area^{1}: 44.23 km^{2} (17.08 sq mi)
- Elevation: 116 m (381 ft)
- Highest elevation: 126 m (413 ft)
- Lowest elevation: 92 m (302 ft)
- Population (2023): 3,467
  - Density: 78.39/km^{2} (203.0/sq mi)
- Time zone: UTC+01:00 (CET)
  - Summer (DST): UTC+02:00 (CEST)
- INSEE/Postal code: 45272 /45590
- ^{1} French Land Register data, which excludes lakes, ponds, glaciers > 1 km^{2} (0.386 sq mi or 247 acres) and river estuaries.

Saint-Cyr-en-Val (French pronunciation: [sɛ̃ siʁ ɑ̃ val]) is a commune in the Loiret department in north-central France. The writer Michèle Desbordes (1940–2006) was born in Saint-Cyr-en-Val.

== Demographics ==
Historical population
Year	Pop.	±% p.a.
1968	1,142	—
1975	1,555	+4.51%
1982	2,373	+6.22%
1990	2,883	+2.46%
1999	3,251	+1.34%
2007	3,173	−0.30%
2012	3,024	−0.96%
2017	3,309	+1.82%
2023	3,467	+0.78%
Source: INSEE

== History ==
- A religious community of canons took place in this city in 1002.
- Jeanne of Arc came in this city on April 29, 1429.

== Twin town ==
Saint-Cyr-en-Val is twinned with Bliesen, Germany

== Economy ==
Around 80 companies are located in the industrial estate "La Sausaye".

== Places to see ==
- Château de la Motte (La Motte Castle)
- Château de Morchêne and its forest

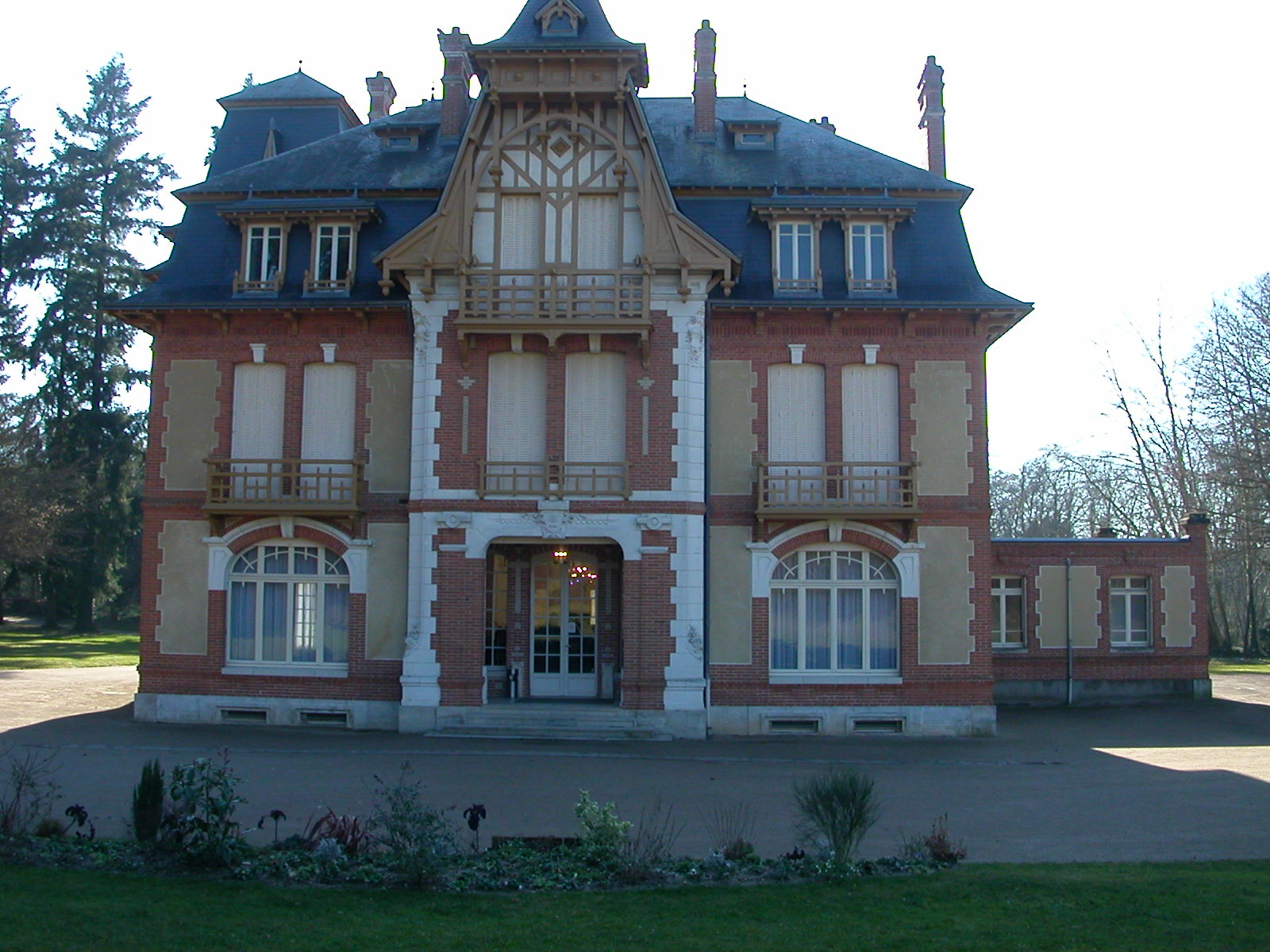
Château de Morchêne

- Saint Sulpice Church

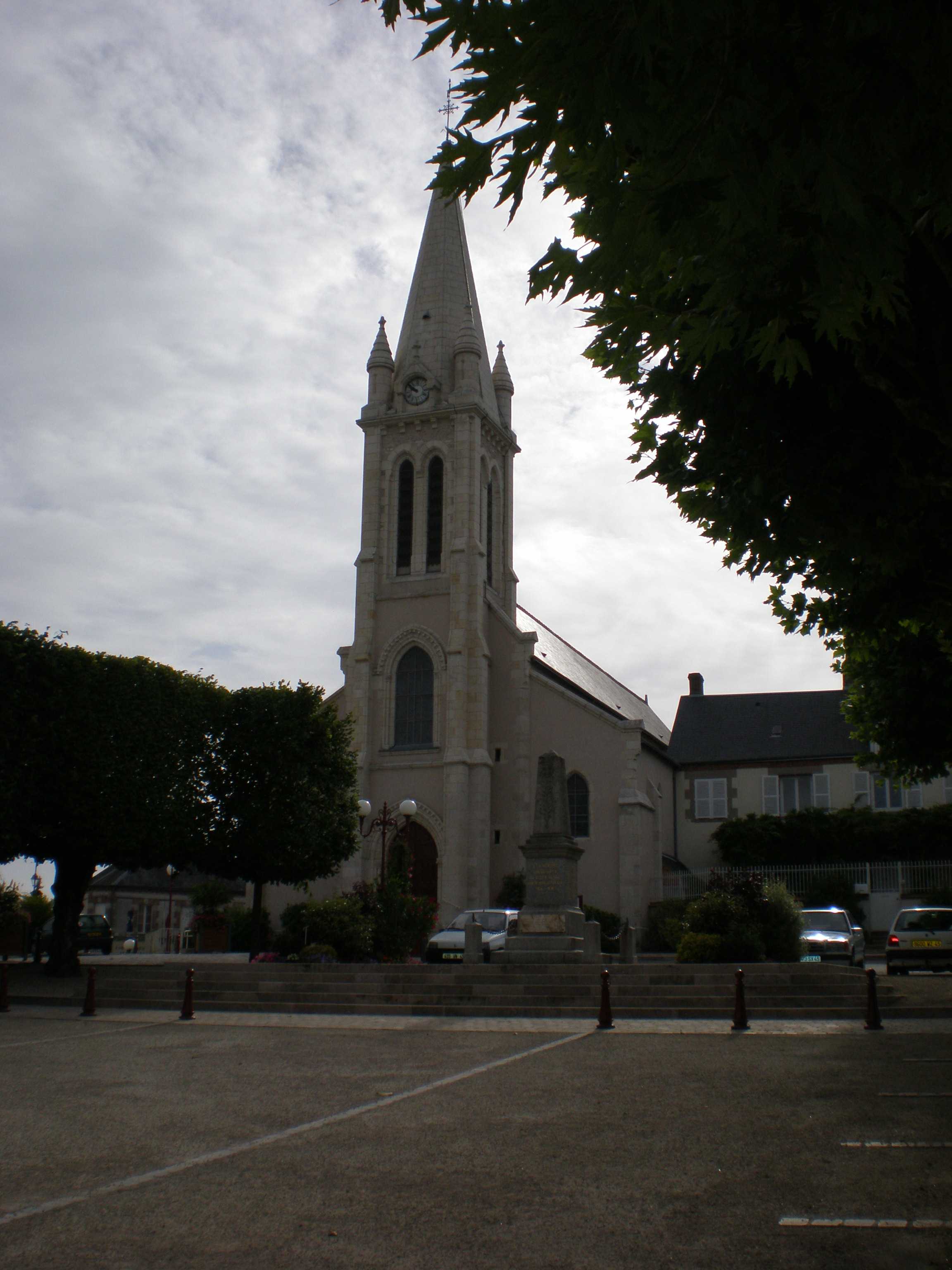
Église Saint Sulpice

== See also ==
- Communes of the Loiret department
