= Cléry-Saint-André =

- Commune
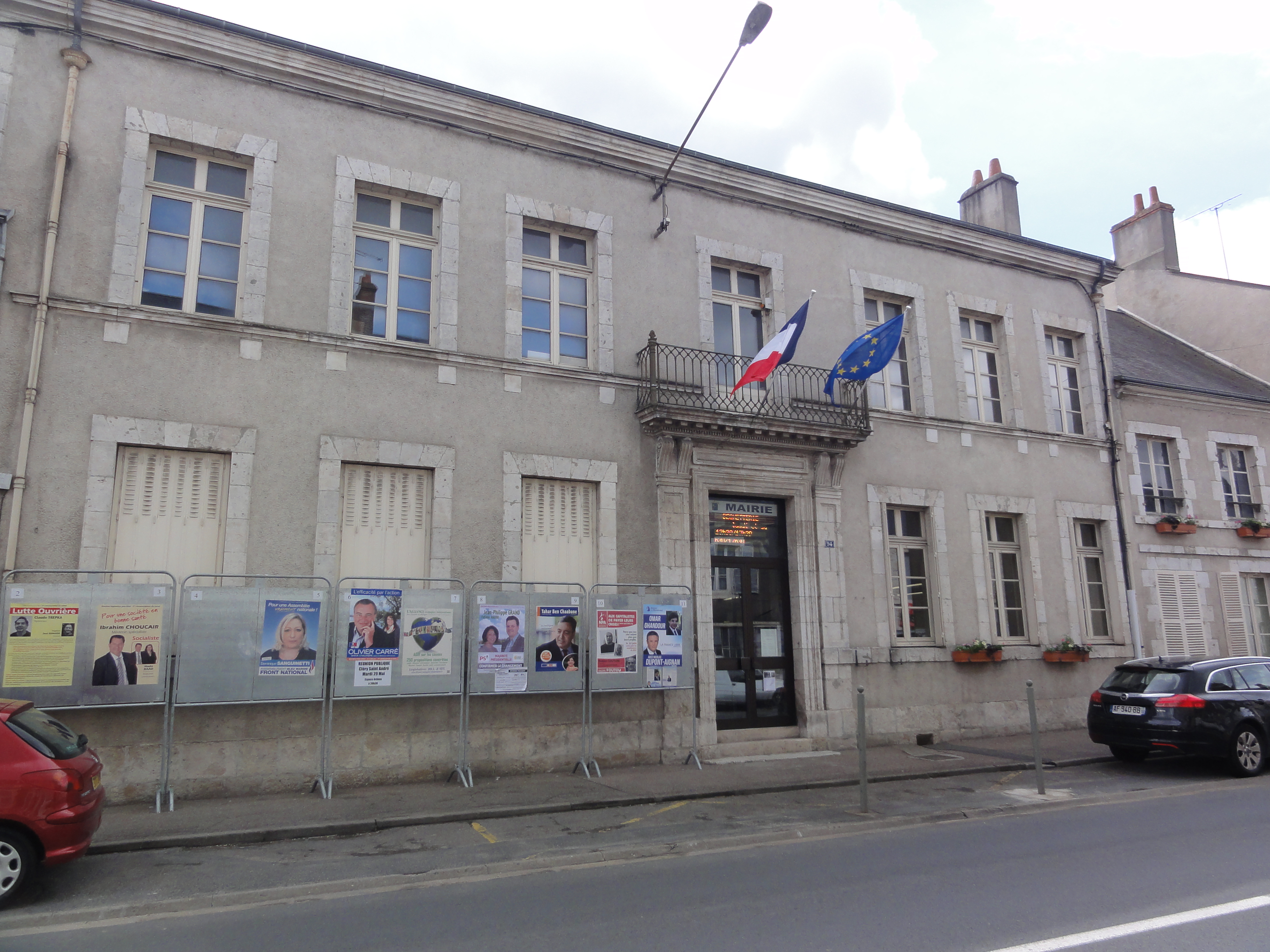
- The town hall in Cléry-Saint-André

- Coat of arms
- Location of Cléry-Saint-André
- Location within France Location within Centre-Val de Loire
- Coordinates: 47°49′16″N 1°45′18″E
- Country: France
- Region: Centre-Val de Loire
- Department: Loiret
- Arrondissement: Orléans
- Canton: Beaugency
- Intercommunality: Terres du Val de Loire

Government
  - Mayor (2020–2026): Gérard Corgnac
- Area^{1}: 18.13 km^{2} (7.00 sq mi)
- Highest elevation: 107 m (351 ft)
- Lowest elevation: 84 m (276 ft)
- Population (2023): 3,596
  - Density: 198.3/km^{2} (513.7/sq mi)
- Demonym: Cléricois
- Time zone: UTC+01:00 (CET)
  - Summer (DST): UTC+02:00 (CEST)
- INSEE/Postal code: 45098 /45370
- Website: www.clery-saint-andre.com
- ^{1} French Land Register data, which excludes lakes, ponds, glaciers > 1 km^{2} (0.386 sq mi or 247 acres) and river estuaries.

Cléry-Saint-André (French pronunciation: [kleʁi sɛ̃.t‿ɑ̃dʁe]) is a commune in the Loiret department in north-central France, near Orléans.

King Louis XI is buried in the Basilica of Notre Dame in the town.

== Population ==
Historical population
Year	Pop.	±% p.a.
1968	1,854	—
1975	2,019	+1.23%
1982	2,232	+1.44%
1990	2,506	+1.46%
1999	2,718	+0.91%
2007	3,074	+1.55%
2012	3,313	+1.51%
2017	3,443	+0.77%
2023	3,596	+0.73%
Source: INSEE

== See also ==
- Communes of the Loiret department
