= Cantons of the Loiret department =

The following is a list of the 21 cantons of the Loiret department, in France, following the French canton reorganisation which came into effect in March 2015:

- Beaugency
- Châlette-sur-Loing
- Châteauneuf-sur-Loire
- Courtenay
- La Ferté-Saint-Aubin
- Fleury-les-Aubrais
- Gien
- Lorris
- Le Malesherbois
- Meung-sur-Loire
- Montargis
- Olivet
- Orléans-1
- Orléans-2
- Orléans-3
- Orléans-4
- Pithiviers
- Saint-Jean-de-Braye
- Saint-Jean-de-la-Ruelle
- Saint-Jean-le-Blanc
- Sully-sur-Loire
