= Departmental Council of Loiret =

Departmental legislature in France

Departmental Council of Loiret Conseil départemental du Loiret
- Logo of the Council

Leadership
- President: Marc Gaudet, UDI since 13 November 2017

Meeting place
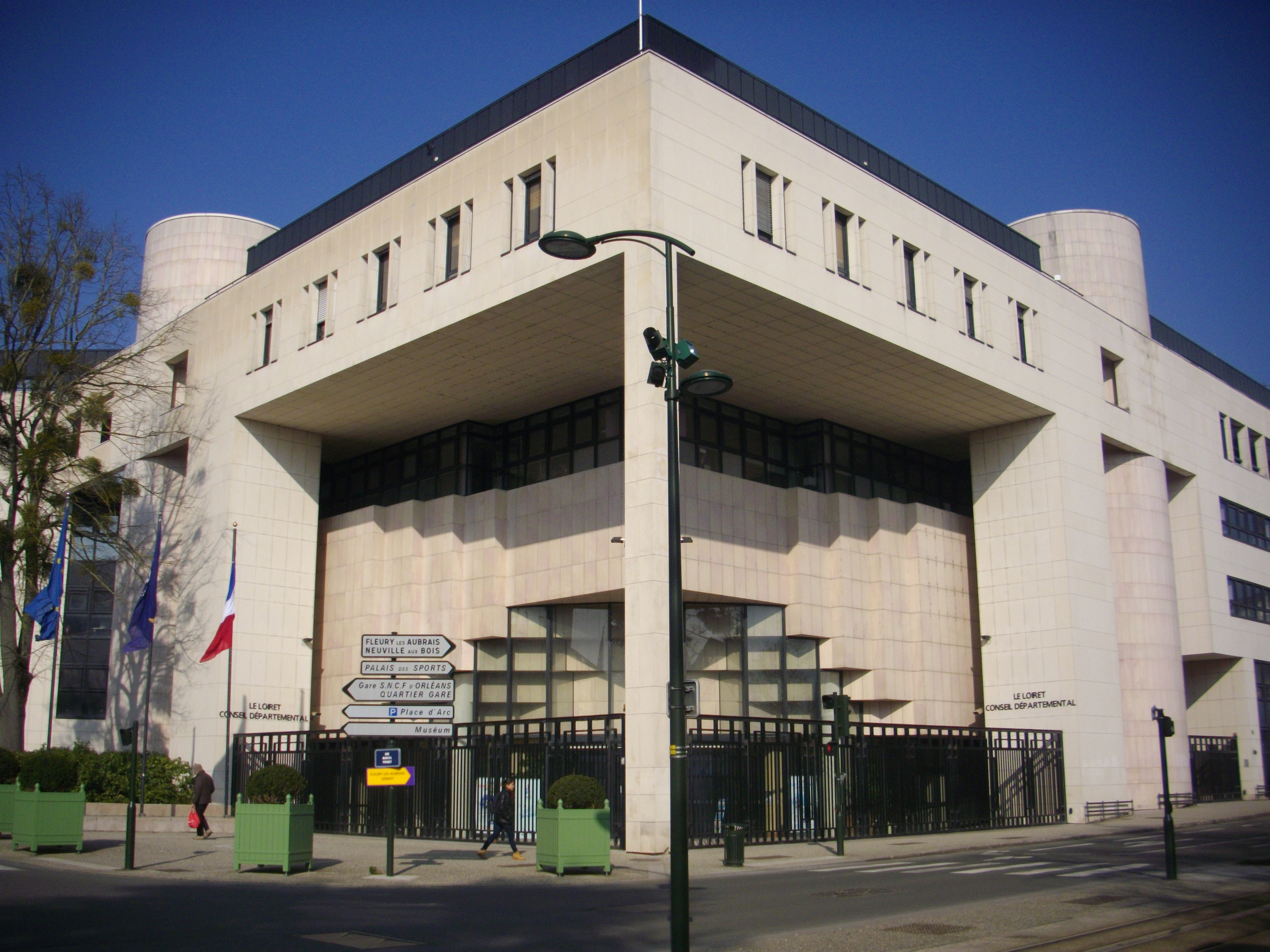
- Seat of the Council in Orléans

Website
- www.loiret.fr

Departmental Council of Loiret (French: Conseil départemental du Loiret) is the deliberate assembly of the French Department of Loiret. It consists of 42 members, known as departmental councilors, from 21 cantons of the department. Its headquarters are in Orléans, the department's prefecture.

Fully renewed on 20 and 27 June 2021, the departmental council has been chaired since 2017 by Marc Gaudet (UDI).

== Composition ==
Distribution of seats (as of 2021)
Party	Acronym	Seats
Majority (30 seats)
The Republicans and allies	LR	21
Miscellaneous right	DVD	5
Miscellaneous centre	DVC	4
Opposition (12 seats)
Socialist Party and allies	PS	7
Europe Ecology – The Greens	EELV	2
French Communist Party	PCF	2
Miscellaneous left	DVG	1

== Executive ==
=== Presidents ===
Period		Name	Party
1945	1956	Pierre Dézarnaulds	PR
1956	1958	Maurice Charpentier	CNIP
1958	1961	Pierre Perroy	CNIP
1961	1964	Claude Lemaitre-Basset	RGR
1964	1979	Pierre Pagot	UDF
1979	1994	Kléber Malécot	UDF
1994	2015	Éric Doligé	LR
2015	2017	Hugues Saury	LR
2017	Incumbent	Marc Gaudet	UDI

=== Vice presidents ===
The President of the Departmental Council is assisted by 12 vice presidents chosen from among the departmental councillors. Each of them has a delegation of authority.

List of vice presidents of the Departmental Council (as of 2021)
Order	Name	Canton
1st	Pauline Martin	Canton of Meung-sur-Loire
2nd	Christian Braux	Canton of La Ferté-Saint-Aubin
3rd	Laurence Bellais	Canton of Saint-Jean-le-Blanc
4th	Jean-Luc Riglet	Canton of Sully-sur-Loire
5th	Nadia Labadie	Canton of Orléans-1
6th	Hervé Gaurat	Canton of Le Malesherbois
7th	Florence Galzin	Canton of Châteauneuf-sur-Loire
8th	Frédéric Neraud	Canton of Courtenay
9th	Anne Gaborit	Canton of La Ferté-Saint-Aubin
10th	Francis Cammal	Canton of Gien
11th	Line Fleury	Canton of Sully-sur-Loire
12th	Ariel Levy	Canton of Montargis
