= Claude Bourdin =

French politician (1943–2025)

Deputy of the French National Assembly for Loiret's 1st constituency
- In office 18 June 1991 – 1 April 1993
- Preceded by: Jean-Pierre Sueur
- Succeeded by: Antoine Carré

Mayor of Beaugency
- In office 18 June 1995 – 4 April 2014
- Preceded by: Thérèse Cherrier
- Succeeded by: David Faucon

Member of the General Council of Loiret for the Canton of Beaugency
- In office 27 March 1988 – 2 April 2015
- Preceded by: Thérèse Cherrier
- Succeeded by: Shiva Chauvière

Member of the Regional Council of Centre
- In office 16 March 1986 – 8 June 1991

Personal details
- Born: 3 May 1943 La Ferté-Saint-Aubin, German-occupied France
- Died: 1 October 2025 (aged 82)
- Political party: PS
- Education: University of Tours
- Occupation: Guidance counselor

Claude Bourdin (French: [klod buʁdɛ̃]; 3 May 1943 – 1 October 2025) was a French politician of the Socialist Party (PS).

== Life and career ==
Bourdin graduated from the faculty of letters at the University of Tours before entering politics as a municipal councillor in Beaugency. He was elected to the Regional Council of Centre in 1986 and the General Council of Loiret in 1988. He joined the National Assembly in 1991 when Jean-Pierre Sueur joined the government of Prime Minister Édith Cresson, serving until 1993. Outside of politics, he was a painter, holding expositions in Orléans after his retirement.

Bourdin died on 1 October 2025, at the age of 82.
