= Guilly, Loiret =

Guilly
- Commune
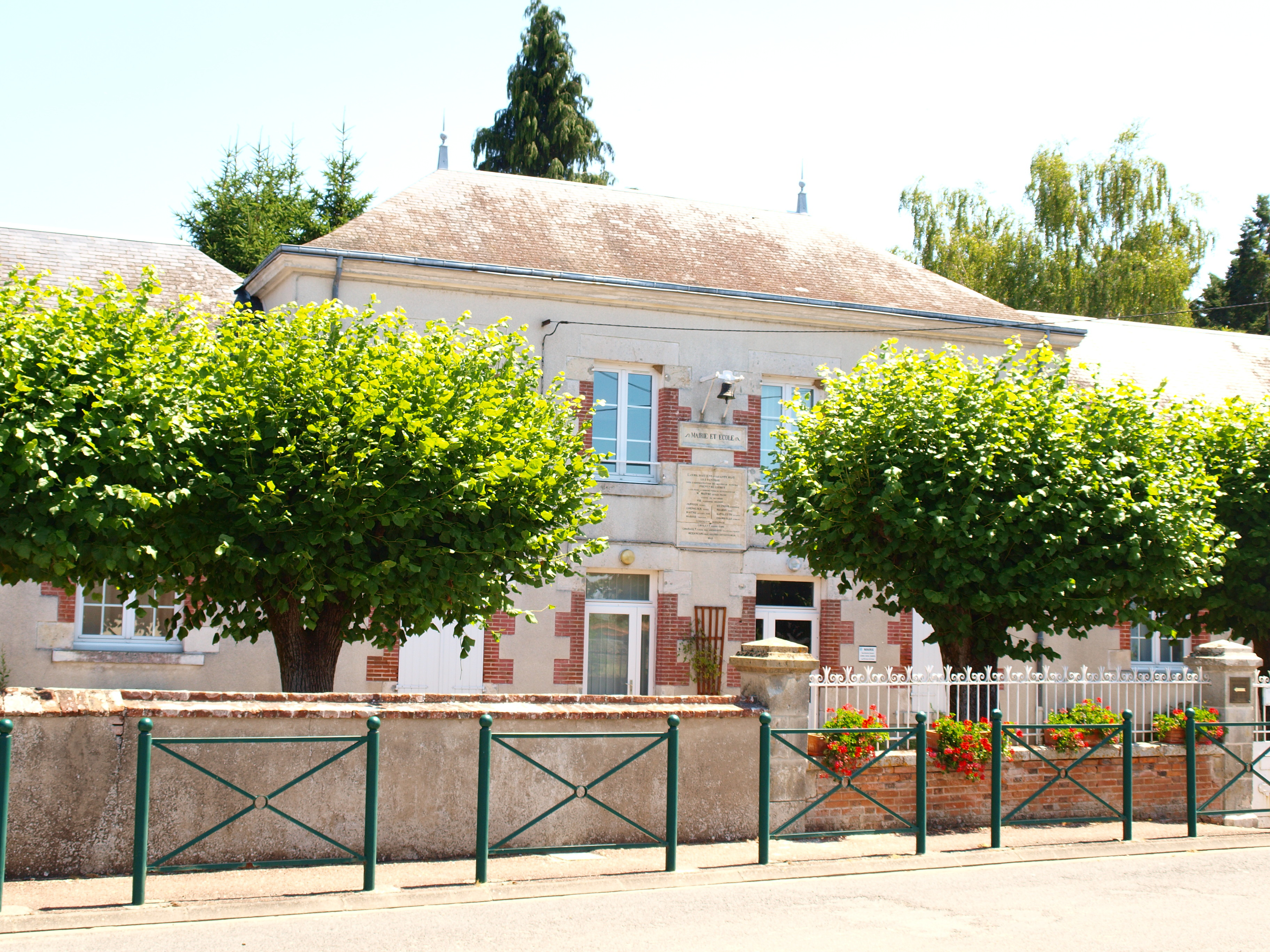
- Town hall

- Coat of arms
- Location of Guilly
- Location within France Location within Centre-Val de Loire
- Coordinates: 47°48′14″N 2°16′37″E
- Country: France
- Region: Centre-Val de Loire
- Department: Loiret
- Arrondissement: Orléans
- Canton: Sully-sur-Loire

Government
  - Mayor (2020–2026): Nicole Brague
- Area^{1}: 17.03 km^{2} (6.58 sq mi)
- Highest elevation: 119 m (390 ft)
- Lowest elevation: 102 m (335 ft)
- Population (2023): 659
  - Density: 38.7/km^{2} (100/sq mi)
- Time zone: UTC+01:00 (CET)
  - Summer (DST): UTC+02:00 (CEST)
- INSEE/Postal code: 45164 /45600
- ^{1} French Land Register data, which excludes lakes, ponds, glaciers > 1 km^{2} (0.386 sq mi or 247 acres) and river estuaries.

Guilly is a commune in the Loiret department in north-central France.

== See also ==
- Communes of the Loiret department
