= Saint-Florent-le-Jeune =

- Commune
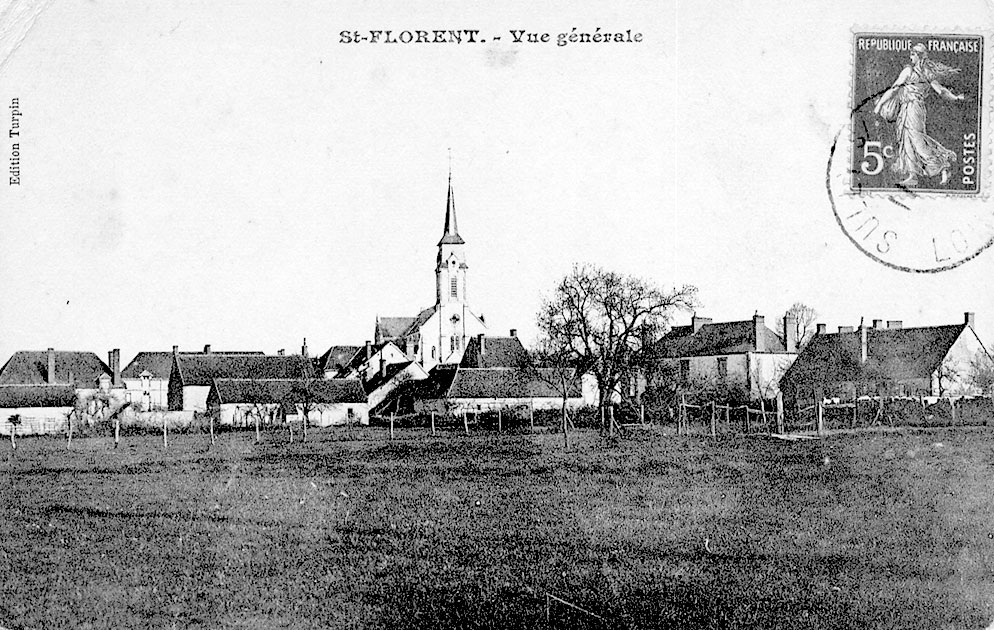
- An old postcard view of Saint-Florent

- Coat of arms
- Location of Saint-Florent-le-Jeune
- Location within France Location within Centre-Val de Loire
- Coordinates: 47°41′00″N 2°29′00″E
- Country: France
- Region: Centre-Val de Loire
- Department: Loiret
- Arrondissement: Orléans
- Canton: Sully-sur-Loire

Government
  - Mayor (2020–2026): Jean-Claude Badaire
- Area^{1}: 37.78 km^{2} (14.59 sq mi)
- Highest elevation: 162 m (531 ft)
- Lowest elevation: 128 m (420 ft)
- Population (2023): 442
  - Density: 11.7/km^{2} (30.3/sq mi)
- Time zone: UTC+01:00 (CET)
  - Summer (DST): UTC+02:00 (CEST)
- INSEE/Postal code: 45277 /45600
- ^{1} French Land Register data, which excludes lakes, ponds, glaciers > 1 km^{2} (0.386 sq mi or 247 acres) and river estuaries.

Saint-Florent-le-Jeune (before 2026: Saint-Florent, French pronunciation: [sɛ̃ flɔʁɑ̃]) is a commune in the Loiret department in north-central France.

== See also ==
- Communes of the Loiret department
