= Ormes, Loiret =

Ormes
- Commune
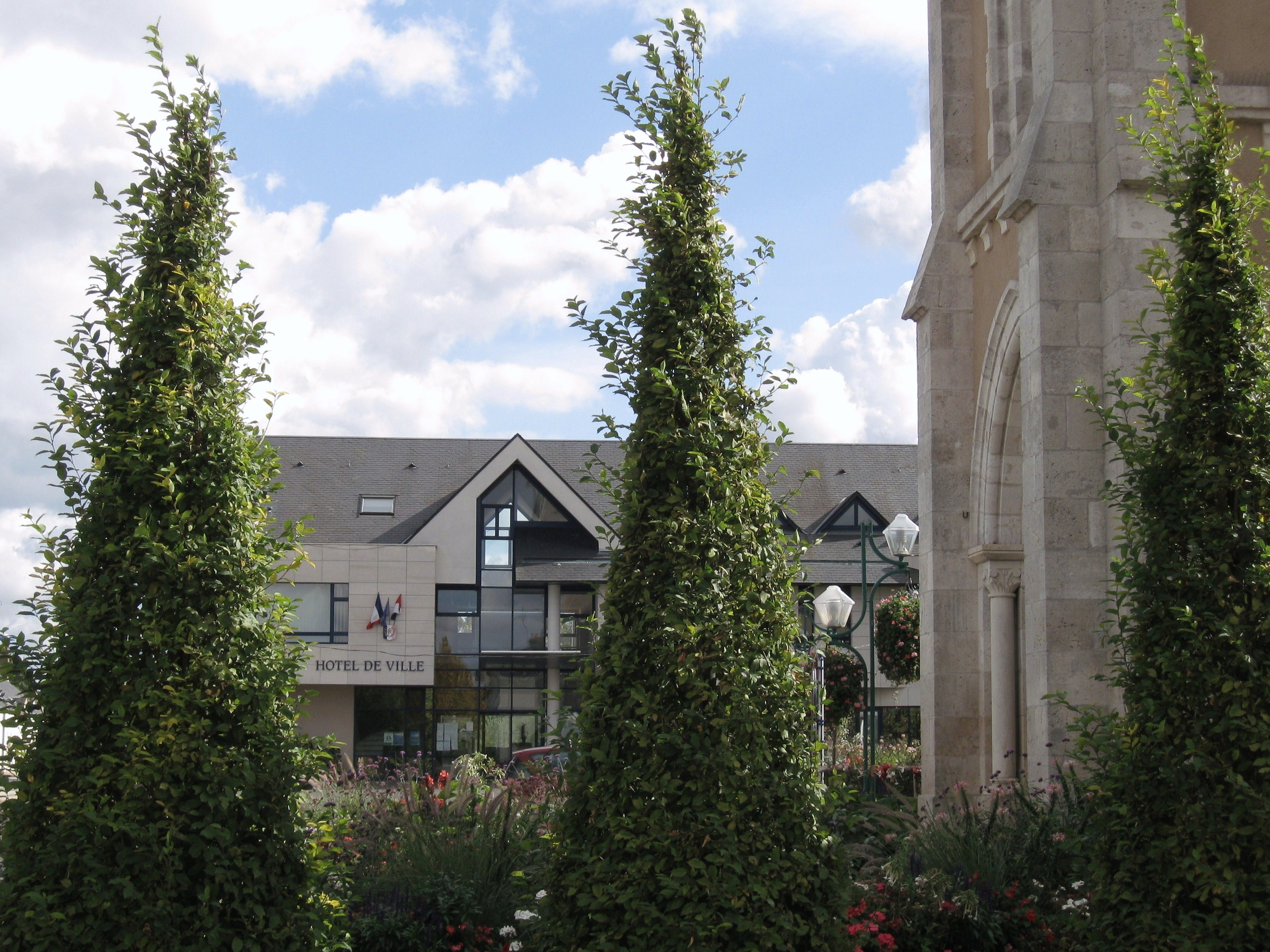
- The town hall in Ormes
- Location of Ormes
- Location within France Location within Centre-Val de Loire
- Coordinates: 47°56′30″N 1°49′18″E
- Country: France
- Region: Centre-Val de Loire
- Department: Loiret
- Arrondissement: Orléans
- Canton: Orléans-3
- Intercommunality: Orléans Métropole

Government
  - Mayor (2020–2026): Alain Touchard
- Area^{1}: 18.15 km^{2} (7.01 sq mi)
- Highest elevation: 131 m (430 ft)
- Lowest elevation: 106 m (348 ft)
- Population (2023): 4,376
  - Density: 241.1/km^{2} (624.5/sq mi)
- Demonym: Ormois
- Time zone: UTC+01:00 (CET)
  - Summer (DST): UTC+02:00 (CEST)
- INSEE/Postal code: 45235 /45140
- Website: www.ville-ormes.fr
- ^{1} French Land Register data, which excludes lakes, ponds, glaciers > 1 km^{2} (0.386 sq mi or 247 acres) and river estuaries.

Ormes (French pronunciation: [ɔʁm]) is a commune in the Loiret department in north-central France.

== Population ==
Historical population
Year	Pop.	±% p.a.
1968	799	—
1975	1,062	+4.15%
1982	1,272	+2.61%
1990	2,291	+7.63%
1999	3,053	+3.24%
2007	3,344	+1.14%
2012	3,628	+1.64%
2017	4,122	+2.59%
2023	4,376	+1.00%
Source: INSEE

== See also ==
- Communes of the Loiret department
