= Ouzouer-sur-Loire =

- Commune
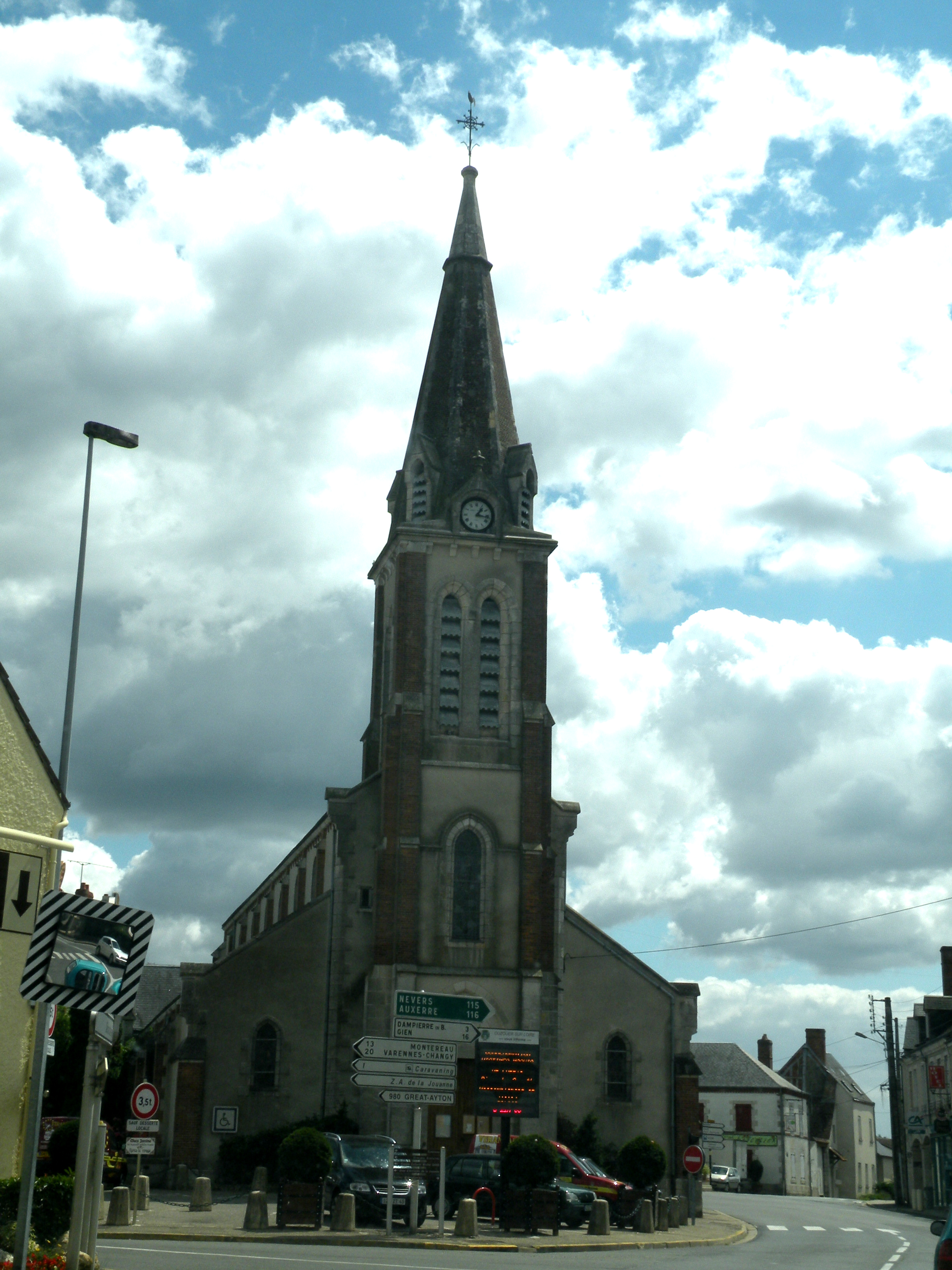
- The church in Ouzouer-sur-Loire

- Coat of arms
- Location of Ouzouer-sur-Loire
- Location within France Location within Centre-Val de Loire
- Coordinates: 47°46′00″N 2°28′49″E
- Country: France
- Region: Centre-Val de Loire
- Department: Loiret
- Arrondissement: Orléans
- Canton: Sully-sur-Loire
- Intercommunality: Val de Sully

Government
  - Mayor (2020–2026): Marie-Madeleine Hamard
- Area^{1}: 34.27 km^{2} (13.23 sq mi)
- Highest elevation: 154 m (505 ft)
- Lowest elevation: 112 m (367 ft)
- Population (2023): 2,543
  - Density: 74.20/km^{2} (192.2/sq mi)
- Demonym: Oratoriens
- Time zone: UTC+01:00 (CET)
  - Summer (DST): UTC+02:00 (CEST)
- INSEE/Postal code: 45244 /45570
- ^{1} French Land Register data, which excludes lakes, ponds, glaciers > 1 km^{2} (0.386 sq mi or 247 acres) and river estuaries.

Ouzouer-sur-Loire (French pronunciation: [uzwɛʁ syʁ lwaʁ], literally Ouzouer on Loire) is a commune in the Loiret department in north-central France.

== Population ==
Historical population
Year	Pop.	±% p.a.
1968	1,075	—
1975	1,405	+3.90%
1982	2,039	+5.46%
1990	2,310	+1.57%
1999	2,524	+0.99%
2007	2,653	+0.63%
2012	2,777	+0.92%
2017	2,738	−0.28%
2023	2,543	−1.22%
Source: INSEE

== See also ==
- Communes of the Loiret department
