= Saint-Père-sur-Loire =

- Commune
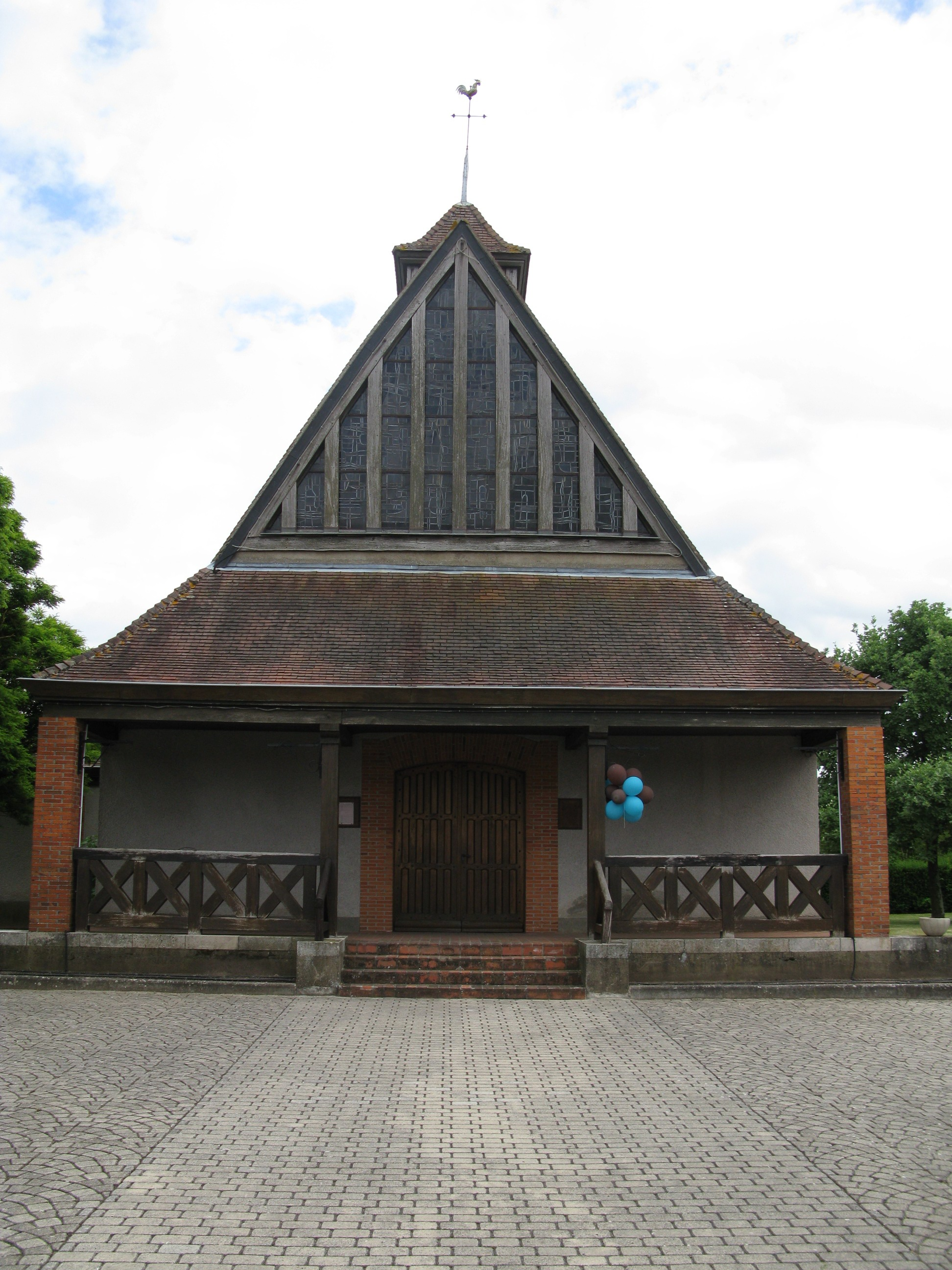
- The church in Saint-Père-sur-Loire

- Coat of arms
- Location of Saint-Père-sur-Loire
- Location within France Location within Centre-Val de Loire
- Coordinates: 47°48′27″N 2°22′15″E
- Country: France
- Region: Centre-Val de Loire
- Department: Loiret
- Arrondissement: Orléans
- Canton: Sully-sur-Loire

Government
  - Mayor (2020–2026): Patrick Foulon
- Area^{1}: 10.69 km^{2} (4.13 sq mi)
- Highest elevation: 117 m (384 ft)
- Lowest elevation: 107 m (351 ft)
- Population (2023): 1,034
  - Density: 96.73/km^{2} (250.5/sq mi)
- Time zone: UTC+01:00 (CET)
  - Summer (DST): UTC+02:00 (CEST)
- INSEE/Postal code: 45297 /45600
- ^{1} French Land Register data, which excludes lakes, ponds, glaciers > 1 km^{2} (0.386 sq mi or 247 acres) and river estuaries.

Saint-Père-sur-Loire (French pronunciation: [sɛ̃ pɛʁ syʁ lwaʁ], literally Saint-Père on Loire) is a commune in the Loiret department in north-central France.

== See also ==
- Communes of the Loiret department
