= Viglain =

- Commune
- Coat of arms
- Location of Viglain
- Location within France Location within Centre-Val de Loire
- Coordinates: 47°43′42″N 2°18′09″E
- Country: France
- Region: Centre-Val de Loire
- Department: Loiret
- Arrondissement: Orléans
- Canton: Sully-sur-Loire
- Intercommunality: CC Val de Sully

Government
  - Mayor (2020–2026): René Hodeau
- Area^{1}: 39.99 km^{2} (15.44 sq mi)
- Elevation: 130 m (430 ft)
- Population (2023): 849
  - Density: 21.2/km^{2} (55.0/sq mi)
- Demonym: Viglainois
- Time zone: UTC+01:00 (CET)
  - Summer (DST): UTC+02:00 (CEST)
- INSEE/Postal code: 45336 /45600
- ^{1} French Land Register data, which excludes lakes, ponds, glaciers > 1 km^{2} (0.386 sq mi or 247 acres) and river estuaries.

Viglain (French pronunciation: [viɡlɛ̃]) is a commune in the Loiret department in north-central France.

== See also ==
- Communes of the Loiret department
