= Bonnée =

- Commune
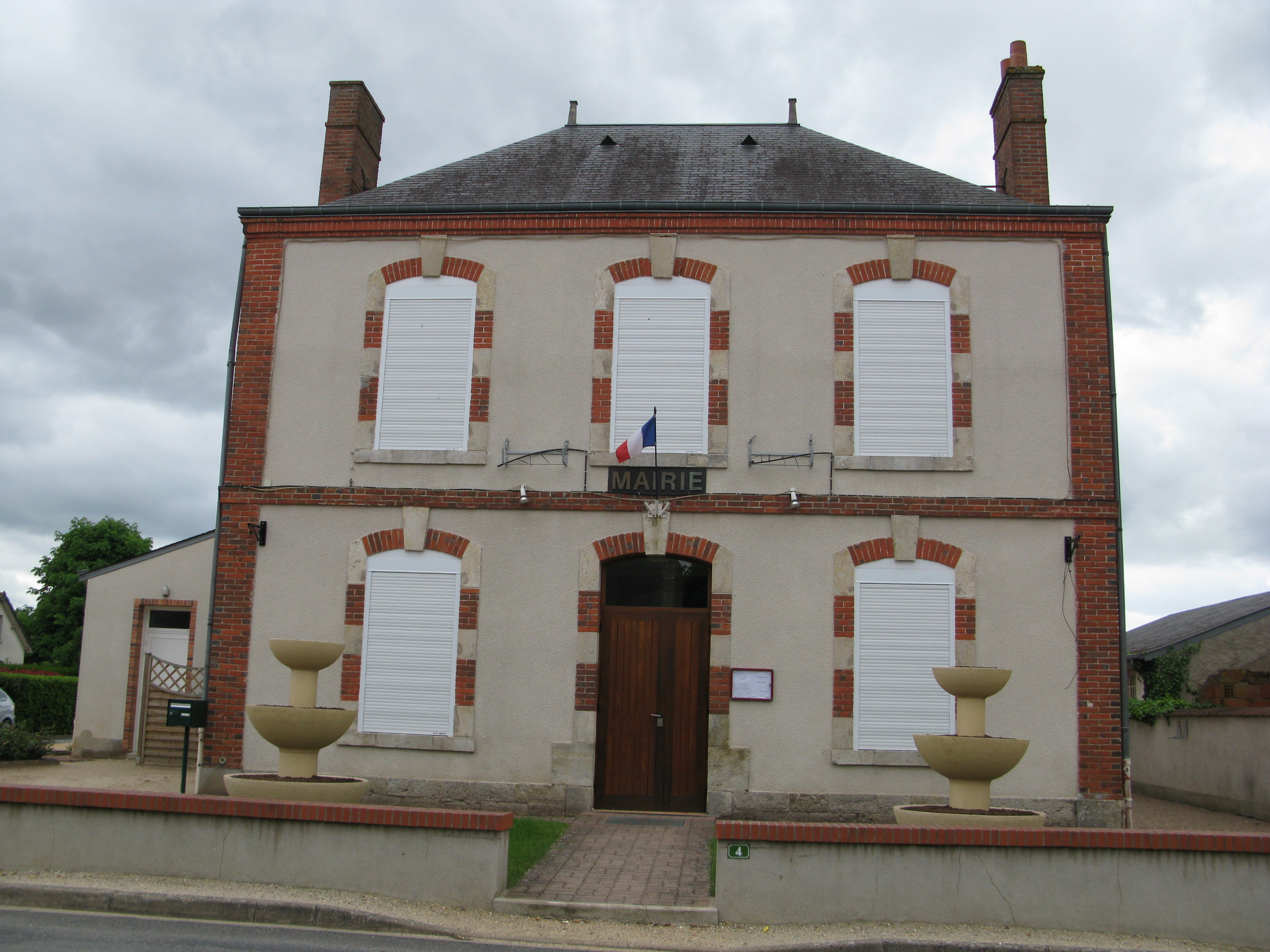
- Town hall
- Location of Bonnée
- Location within France Location within Centre-Val de Loire
- Coordinates: 47°47′52″N 2°22′59″E
- Country: France
- Region: Centre-Val de Loire
- Department: Loiret
- Arrondissement: Orléans
- Canton: Sully-sur-Loire

Government
  - Mayor (2020–2026): Michel Auger
- Area^{1}: 11.61 km^{2} (4.48 sq mi)
- Highest elevation: 118 m (387 ft)
- Lowest elevation: 111 m (364 ft)
- Population (2023): 696
  - Density: 59.9/km^{2} (155/sq mi)
- Time zone: UTC+01:00 (CET)
  - Summer (DST): UTC+02:00 (CEST)
- INSEE/Postal code: 45039 /45460
- ^{1} French Land Register data, which excludes lakes, ponds, glaciers > 1 km^{2} (0.386 sq mi or 247 acres) and river estuaries.

Bonnée (French pronunciation: [bɔne]) is a commune in the Loiret department in north-central France.

== Population ==
Historical population
Year	Pop.	±% p.a.
1968	570	—
1975	590	+0.49%
1982	651	+1.42%
1990	638	−0.25%
1999	658	+0.34%
2007	673	+0.28%
2012	669	−0.12%
2017	713	+1.28%
2023	696	−0.40%
Source: INSEE

== See also ==
- Communes of the Loiret department
