= Neuvy-en-Sullias =

- Commune
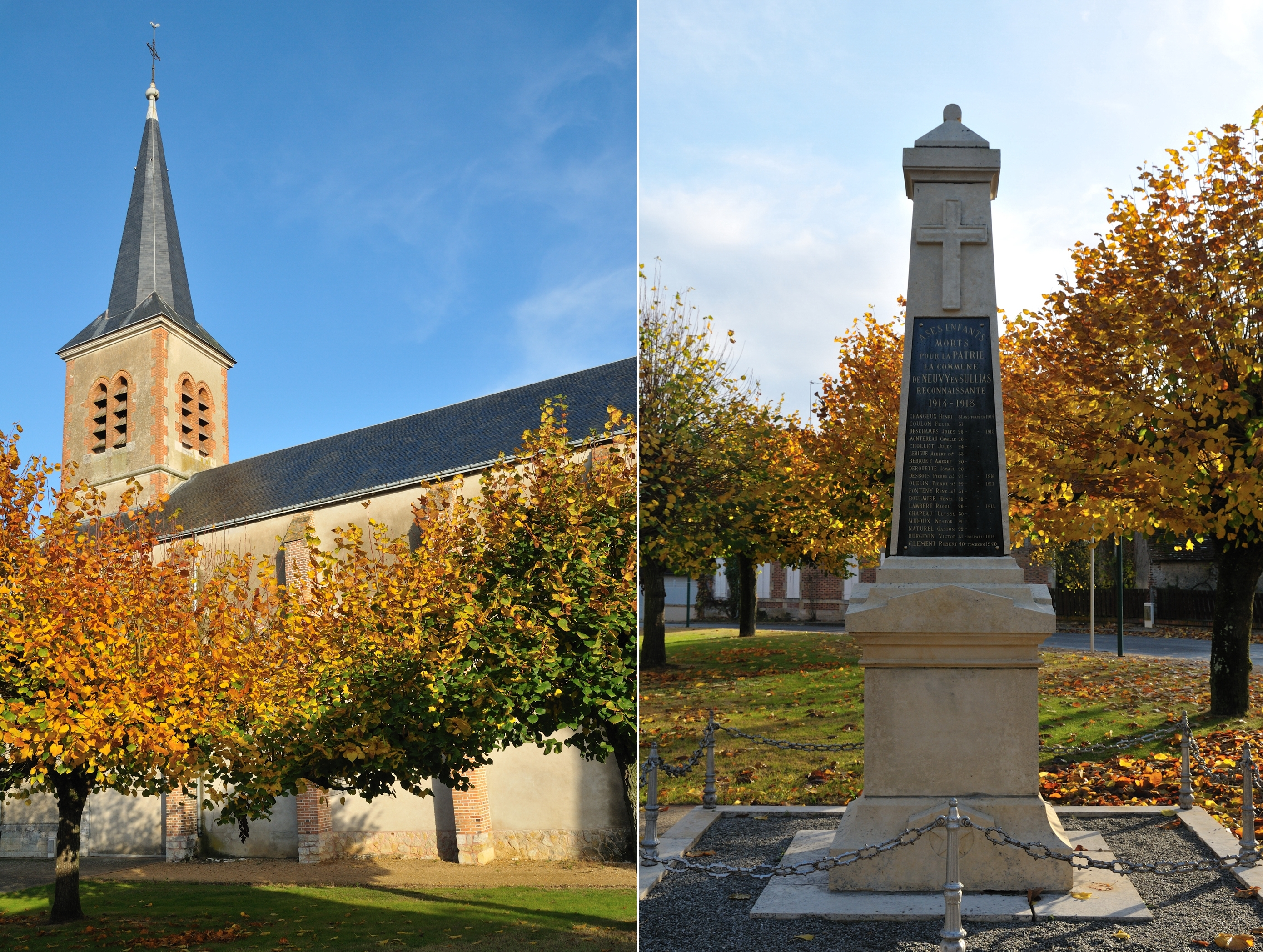
- Church of John the Baptist and war memorial of Neuvy-en-Sullias

- Coat of arms
- Location of Neuvy-en-Sullias
- Location within France Location within Centre-Val de Loire
- Coordinates: 47°47′43″N 2°14′46″E
- Country: France
- Region: Centre-Val de Loire
- Department: Loiret
- Arrondissement: Orléans
- Canton: Sully-sur-Loire

Government
  - Mayor (2020–2026): Hubert Fournier
- Area^{1}: 16.09 km^{2} (6.21 sq mi)
- Highest elevation: 149 m (489 ft)
- Lowest elevation: 106 m (348 ft)
- Population (2023): 1,348
  - Density: 83.78/km^{2} (217.0/sq mi)
- Demonym: Neuvysulliens
- Time zone: UTC+01:00 (CET)
  - Summer (DST): UTC+02:00 (CEST)
- INSEE/Postal code: 45226 /45510
- ^{1} French Land Register data, which excludes lakes, ponds, glaciers > 1 km^{2} (0.386 sq mi or 247 acres) and river estuaries.

Neuvy-en-Sullias (French pronunciation: [nøvi ɑ̃ syljas]) is a commune in the Loiret department located in north-central France.

== See also ==
- Communes of the Loiret department
