= Ménestreau-en-Villette =

- Commune
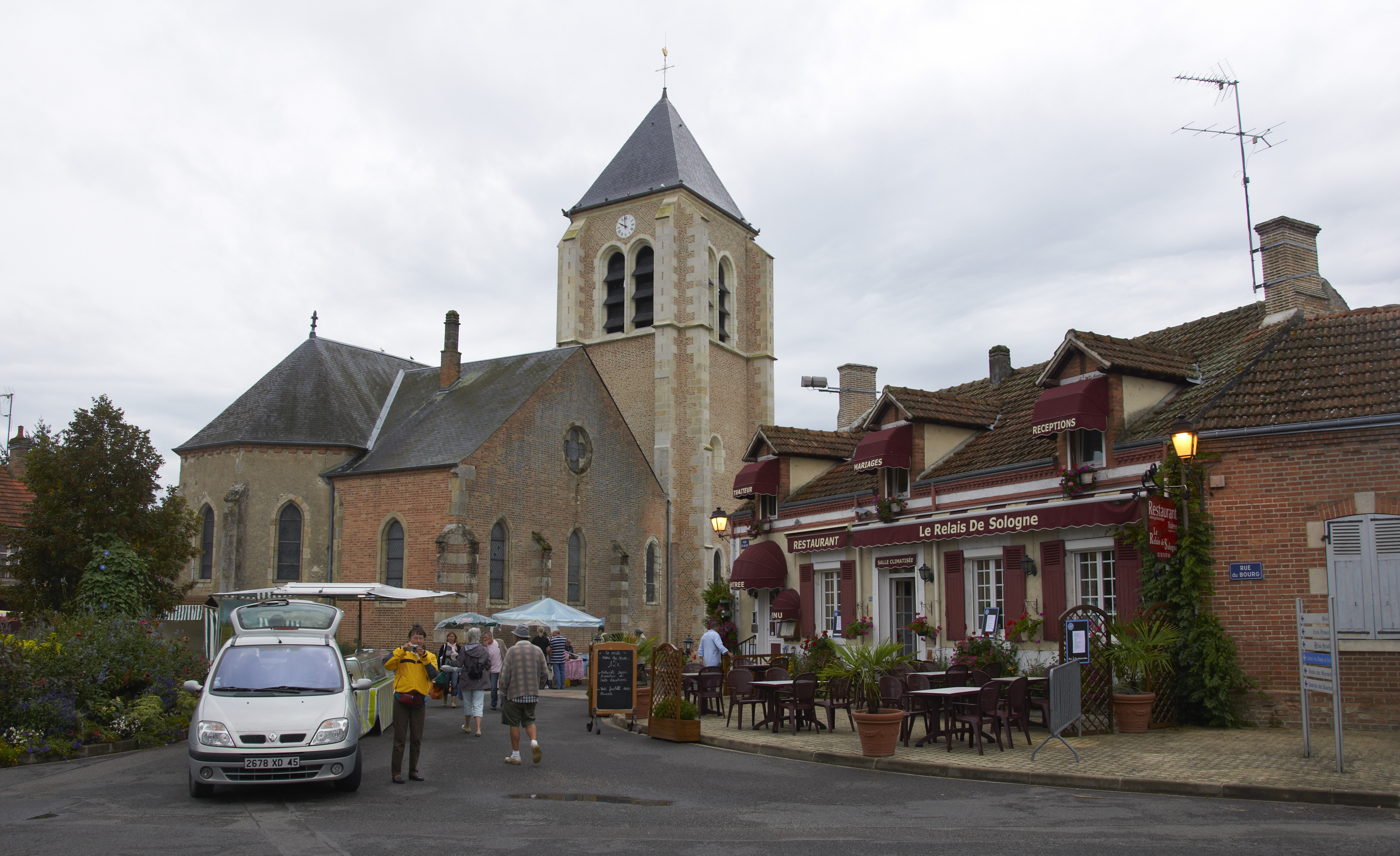
- The church in Ménestreau-en-Villette
- Location of Ménestreau-en-Villette
- Location within France Location within Centre-Val de Loire
- Coordinates: 47°42′00″N 2°01′23″E
- Country: France
- Region: Centre-Val de Loire
- Department: Loiret
- Arrondissement: Orléans
- Canton: La Ferté-Saint-Aubin
- Intercommunality: Portes de Sologne

Government
  - Mayor (2020–2026): Denis Tremault
- Area^{1}: 53.62 km^{2} (20.70 sq mi)
- Highest elevation: 139 m (456 ft)
- Lowest elevation: 104 m (341 ft)
- Population (2023): 1,370
  - Density: 25.6/km^{2} (66.2/sq mi)
- Demonym: Ménestréens
- Time zone: UTC+01:00 (CET)
  - Summer (DST): UTC+02:00 (CEST)
- INSEE/Postal code: 45200 /45240
- Website: www.menestreau-en-villette.fr
- ^{1} French Land Register data, which excludes lakes, ponds, glaciers > 1 km^{2} (0.386 sq mi or 247 acres) and river estuaries.

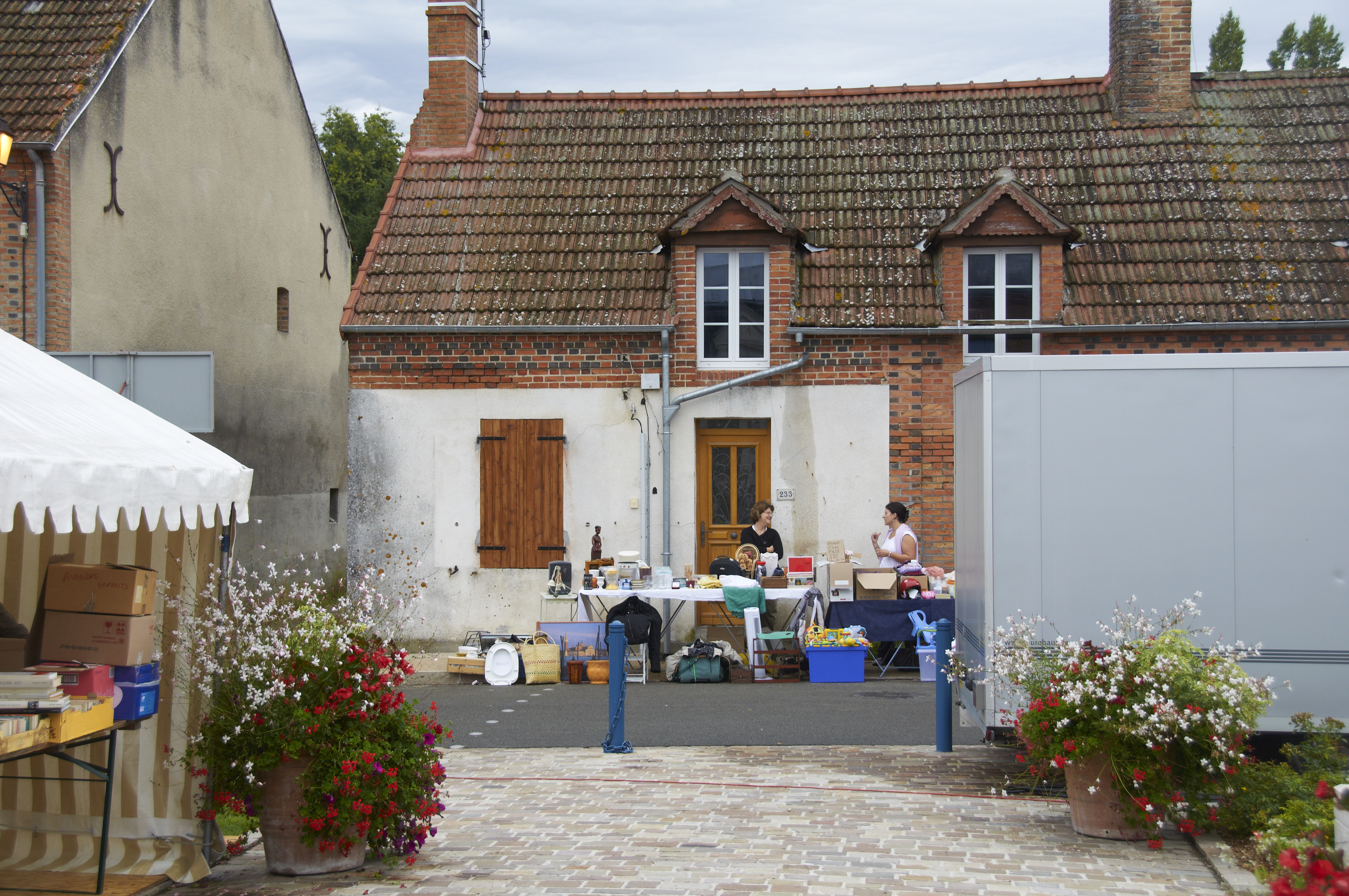
Second hand market in Ménestreau-en-Villette

Ménestreau-en-Villette (French pronunciation: [menɛstʁo ɑ̃ vilɛt]) is a commune in the Loiret department in north-central France.

== See also ==
- Communes of the Loiret department
