= Sennely =

- Commune
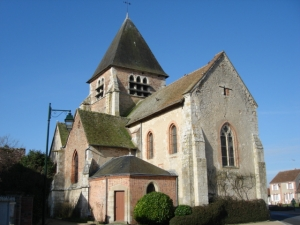
- The church in Sennely
- Location of Sennely
- Location within France Location within Centre-Val de Loire
- Coordinates: 47°40′46″N 2°09′00″E
- Country: France
- Region: Centre-Val de Loire
- Department: Loiret
- Arrondissement: Orléans
- Canton: La Ferté-Saint-Aubin
- Intercommunality: Portes de Sologne

Government
  - Mayor (2020–2026): Philippe de Dreuzy
- Area^{1}: 49.32 km^{2} (19.04 sq mi)
- Highest elevation: 144 m (472 ft)
- Lowest elevation: 114 m (374 ft)
- Population (2023): 677
  - Density: 13.7/km^{2} (35.6/sq mi)
- Demonym: Senneliaciens
- Time zone: UTC+01:00 (CET)
  - Summer (DST): UTC+02:00 (CEST)
- INSEE/Postal code: 45309 /45240
- ^{1} French Land Register data, which excludes lakes, ponds, glaciers > 1 km^{2} (0.386 sq mi or 247 acres) and river estuaries.

Sennely (French pronunciation: [sɛnli]) is a commune in the Loiret department in north-central France. Sennely was carefully studied by Professor Bouchard and the subject of a chapter in "After the Black Death."

== See also ==
- Communes of the Loiret department
