= Saint-Martin-sur-Ocre, Loiret =

Saint-Martin-sur-Ocre
- Commune
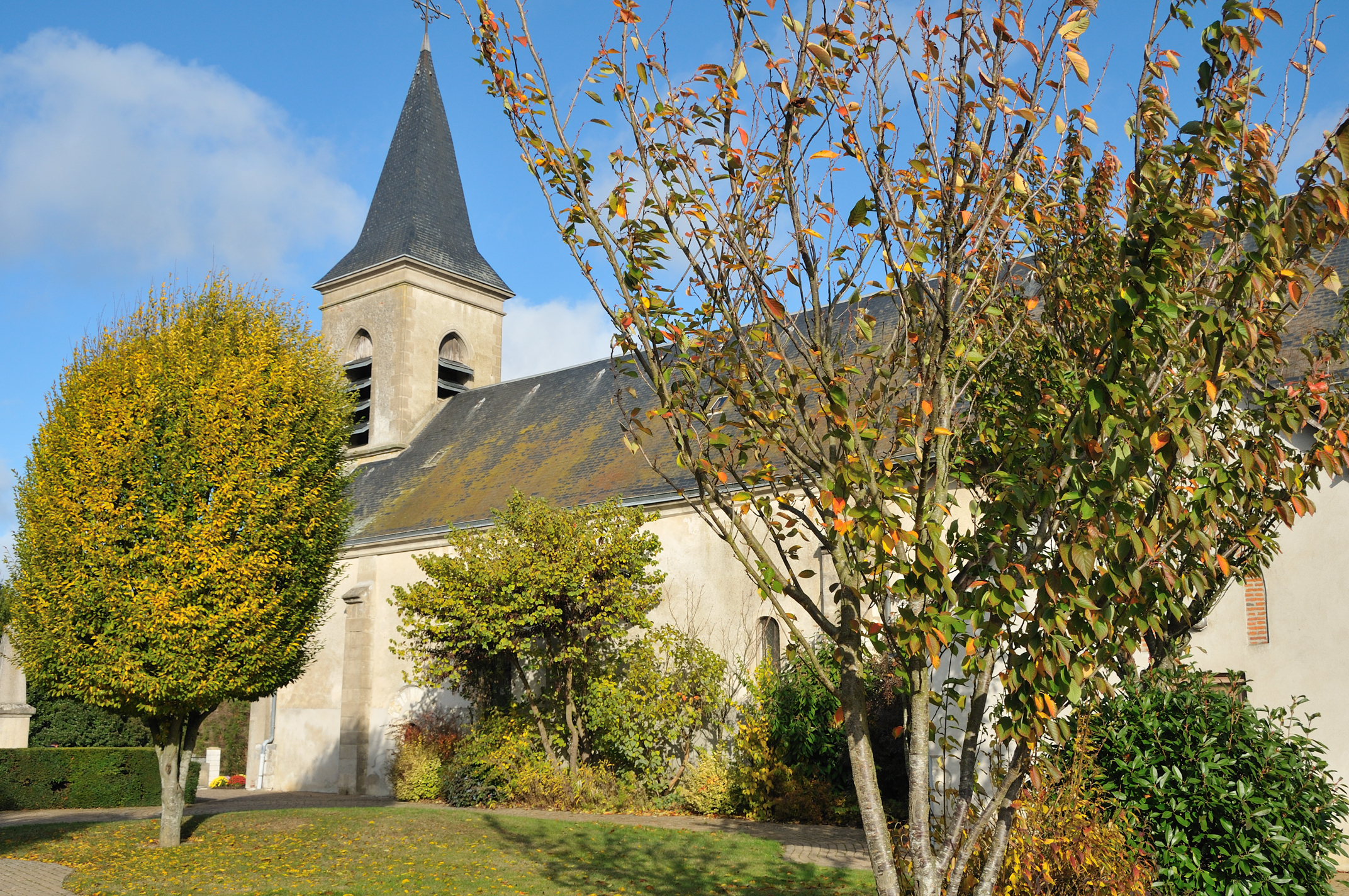
- The church in Saint-Martin-sur-Ocre

- Coat of arms
- Location of Saint-Martin-sur-Ocre
- Location within France Location within Centre-Val de Loire
- Coordinates: 47°39′36″N 2°39′32″E
- Country: France
- Region: Centre-Val de Loire
- Department: Loiret
- Arrondissement: Montargis
- Canton: Sully-sur-Loire
- Intercommunality: CC Giennoises

Government
  - Mayor (2020–2026): Patrick Chenuet
- Area^{1}: 15.79 km^{2} (6.10 sq mi)
- Highest elevation: 191 m (627 ft)
- Lowest elevation: 122 m (400 ft)
- Population (2023): 1,222
  - Density: 77.39/km^{2} (200.4/sq mi)
- Demonym: Ocriniens
- Time zone: UTC+01:00 (CET)
  - Summer (DST): UTC+02:00 (CEST)
- INSEE/Postal code: 45291 /45500
- ^{1} French Land Register data, which excludes lakes, ponds, glaciers > 1 km^{2} (0.386 sq mi or 247 acres) and river estuaries.

Saint-Martin-sur-Ocre (French pronunciation: [sɛ̃ maʁtɛ̃ syʁ ɔkʁ]) is a commune in the Loiret department in north-central France.

== See also ==
- Communes of the Loiret department
