= Ardon, Loiret =

Ardon
- Commune
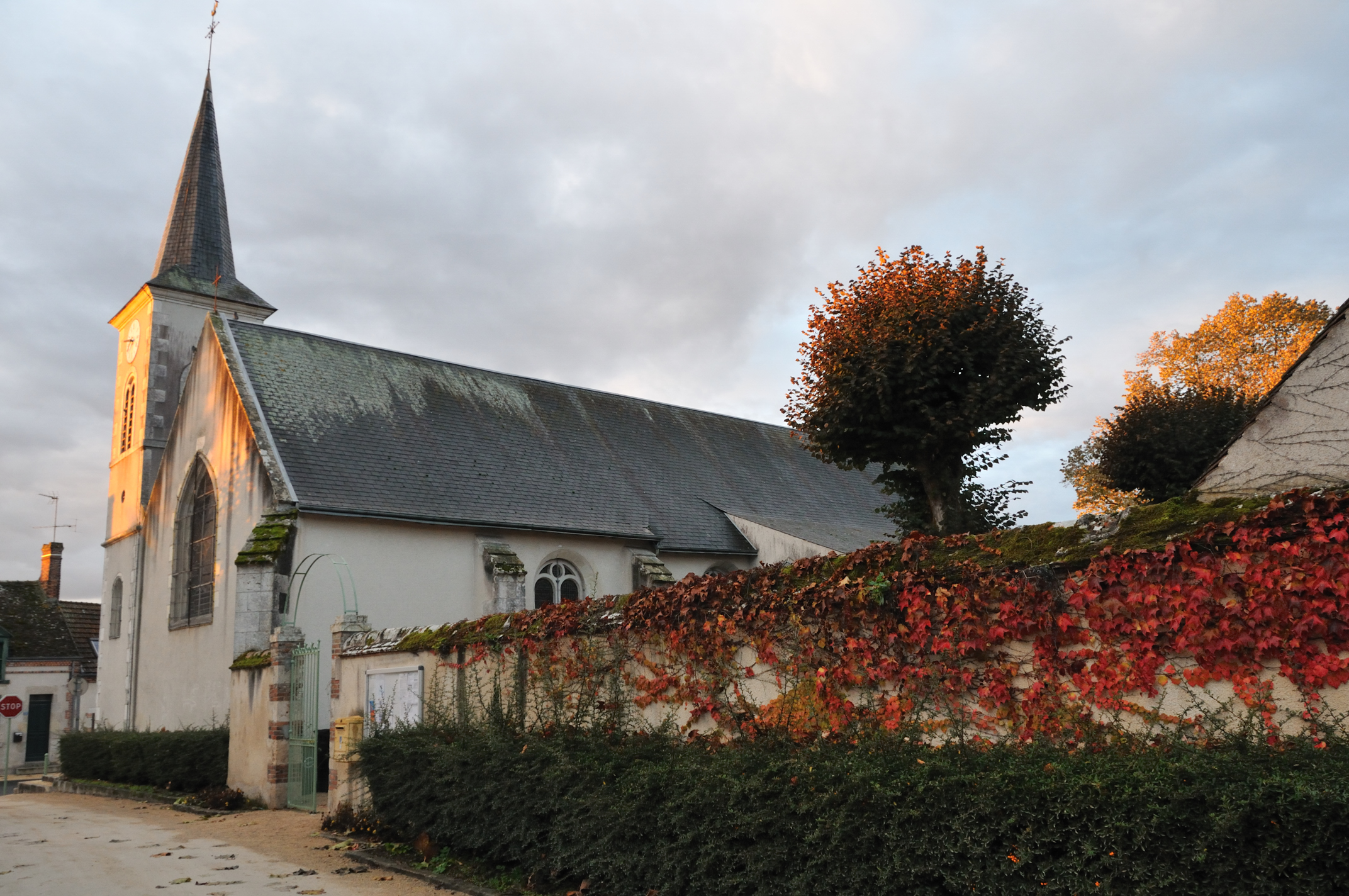
- The church in Ardon

- Coat of arms
- Location of Ardon
- Location within France Location within Centre-Val de Loire
- Coordinates: 47°46′45″N 1°52′29″E
- Country: France
- Region: Centre-Val de Loire
- Department: Loiret
- Arrondissement: Orléans
- Canton: La Ferté-Saint-Aubin
- Intercommunality: Portes de Sologne

Government
  - Mayor (2020–2026): Jean-Paul Roche
- Area^{1}: 53.65 km^{2} (20.71 sq mi)
- Highest elevation: 123 m (404 ft)
- Lowest elevation: 98 m (322 ft)
- Population (2023): 1,203
  - Density: 22.42/km^{2} (58.08/sq mi)
- Time zone: UTC+01:00 (CET)
  - Summer (DST): UTC+02:00 (CEST)
- INSEE/Postal code: 45006 /45160
- ^{1} French Land Register data, which excludes lakes, ponds, glaciers > 1 km^{2} (0.386 sq mi or 247 acres) and river estuaries.

Ardon (French pronunciation: [aʁdɔ̃]) is a commune in the Loiret department in north-central France.

== Population ==
Historical population
Year	Pop.	±% p.a.
1968	348	—
1975	536	+6.36%
1982	700	+3.89%
1990	731	+0.54%
1999	851	+1.70%
2007	1,138	+3.70%
2012	1,104	−0.60%
2017	1,117	+0.23%
2023	1,203	+1.24%
Source: INSEE

== See also ==
- Communes of the Loiret department
