= Saint-Aignan-le-Jaillard =

- Commune
- Coat of arms
- Location of Saint-Aignan-le-Jaillard
- Location within France Location within Centre-Val de Loire
- Coordinates: 47°44′36″N 2°26′24″E
- Country: France
- Region: Centre-Val de Loire
- Department: Loiret
- Arrondissement: Orléans
- Canton: Sully-sur-Loire

Government
  - Mayor (2020–2026): Hugo Planchet
- Area^{1}: 24.31 km^{2} (9.39 sq mi)
- Highest elevation: 159 m (522 ft)
- Lowest elevation: 112 m (367 ft)
- Population (2023): 596
  - Density: 24.5/km^{2} (63.5/sq mi)
- Time zone: UTC+01:00 (CET)
  - Summer (DST): UTC+02:00 (CEST)
- INSEE/Postal code: 45268 /45600
- ^{1} French Land Register data, which excludes lakes, ponds, glaciers > 1 km^{2} (0.386 sq mi or 247 acres) and river estuaries.

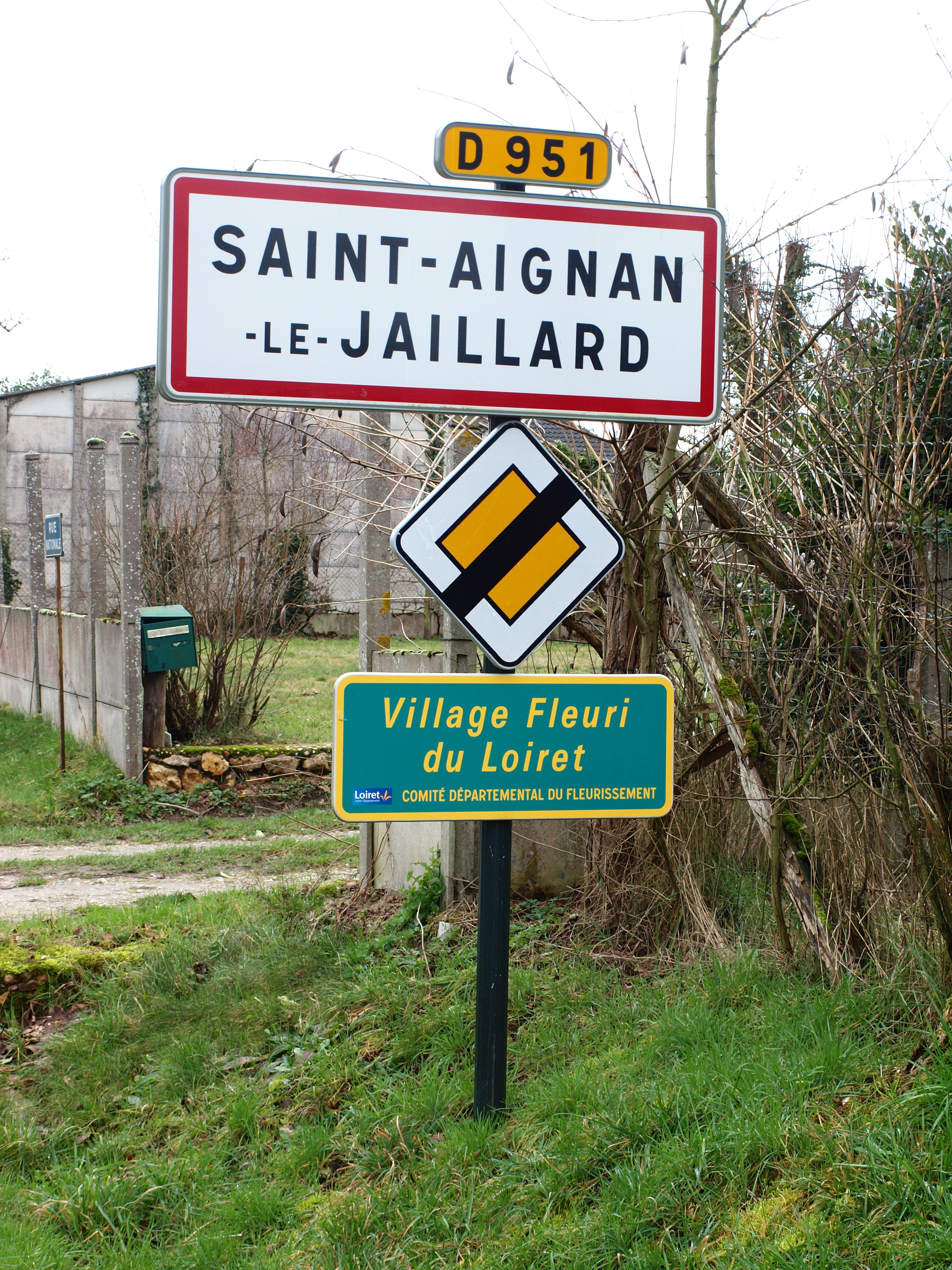
Saint-Aignan-le-Jaillard

Saint-Aignan-le-Jaillard (French pronunciation: [sɛ̃.t‿ɛɲɑ̃ lə ʒajaʁ]) is a commune in the Loiret department in north-central France.

== See also ==
- Communes of the Loiret department
