= Lion-en-Sullias =

- Commune
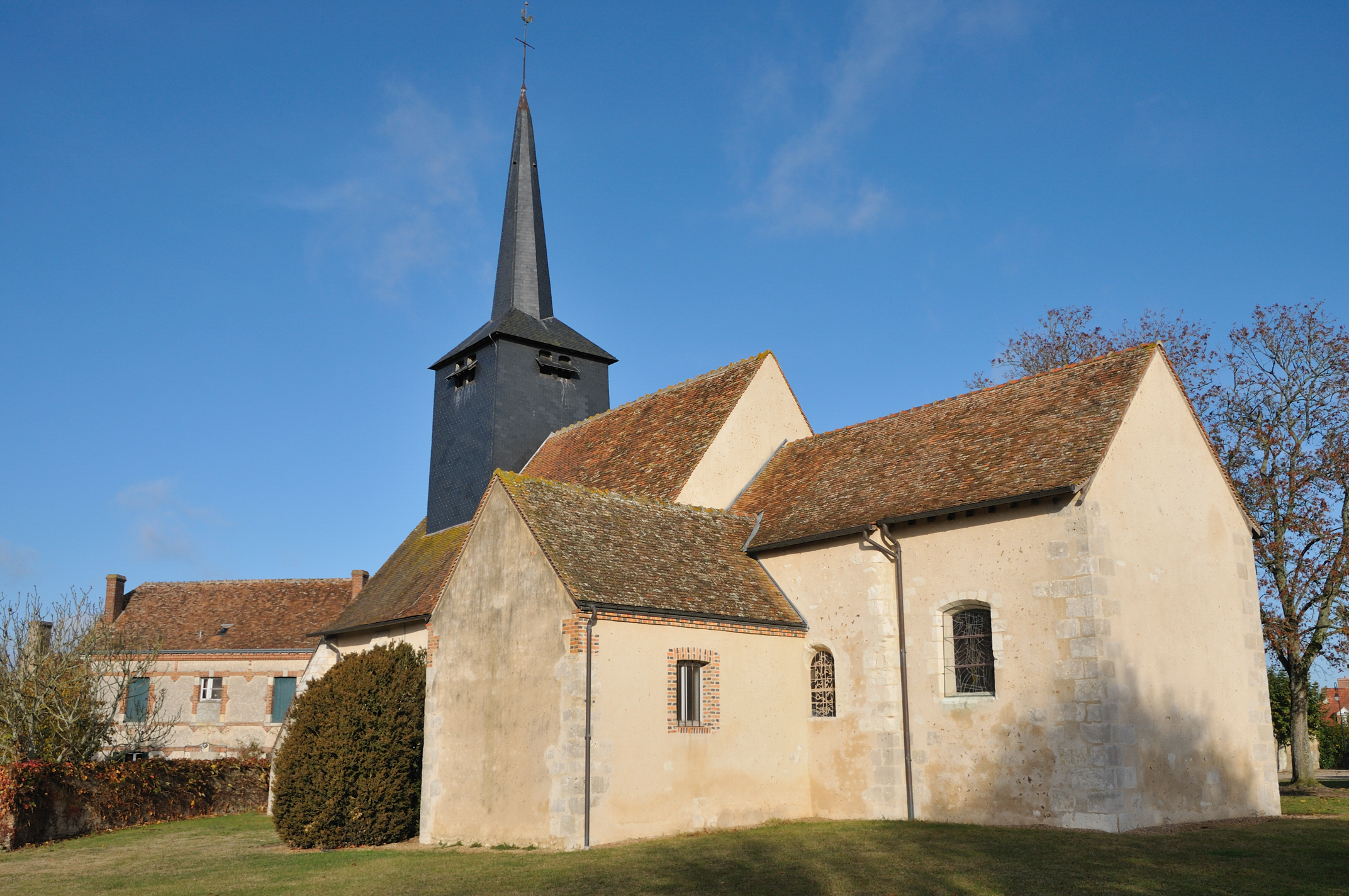
- The church in Lion-en-Sullias

- Coat of arms
- Location of Lion-en-Sullias
- Location within France Location within Centre-Val de Loire
- Coordinates: 47°43′37″N 2°29′26″E
- Country: France
- Region: Centre-Val de Loire
- Department: Loiret
- Arrondissement: Orléans
- Canton: Sully-sur-Loire

Government
  - Mayor (2020–2026): Johanny Hautin
- Area^{1}: 24.49 km^{2} (9.46 sq mi)
- Highest elevation: 152 m (499 ft)
- Lowest elevation: 113 m (371 ft)
- Population (2023): 382
  - Density: 15.6/km^{2} (40.4/sq mi)
- Time zone: UTC+01:00 (CET)
  - Summer (DST): UTC+02:00 (CEST)
- INSEE/Postal code: 45184 /45600
- ^{1} French Land Register data, which excludes lakes, ponds, glaciers > 1 km^{2} (0.386 sq mi or 247 acres) and river estuaries.

Lion-en-Sullias (French pronunciation: [ljɔ̃ ɑ̃ syljas]) is a commune in the Loiret department in north-central France.

== See also ==
- Communes of the Loiret department
