= Marcilly-en-Villette =

- Commune
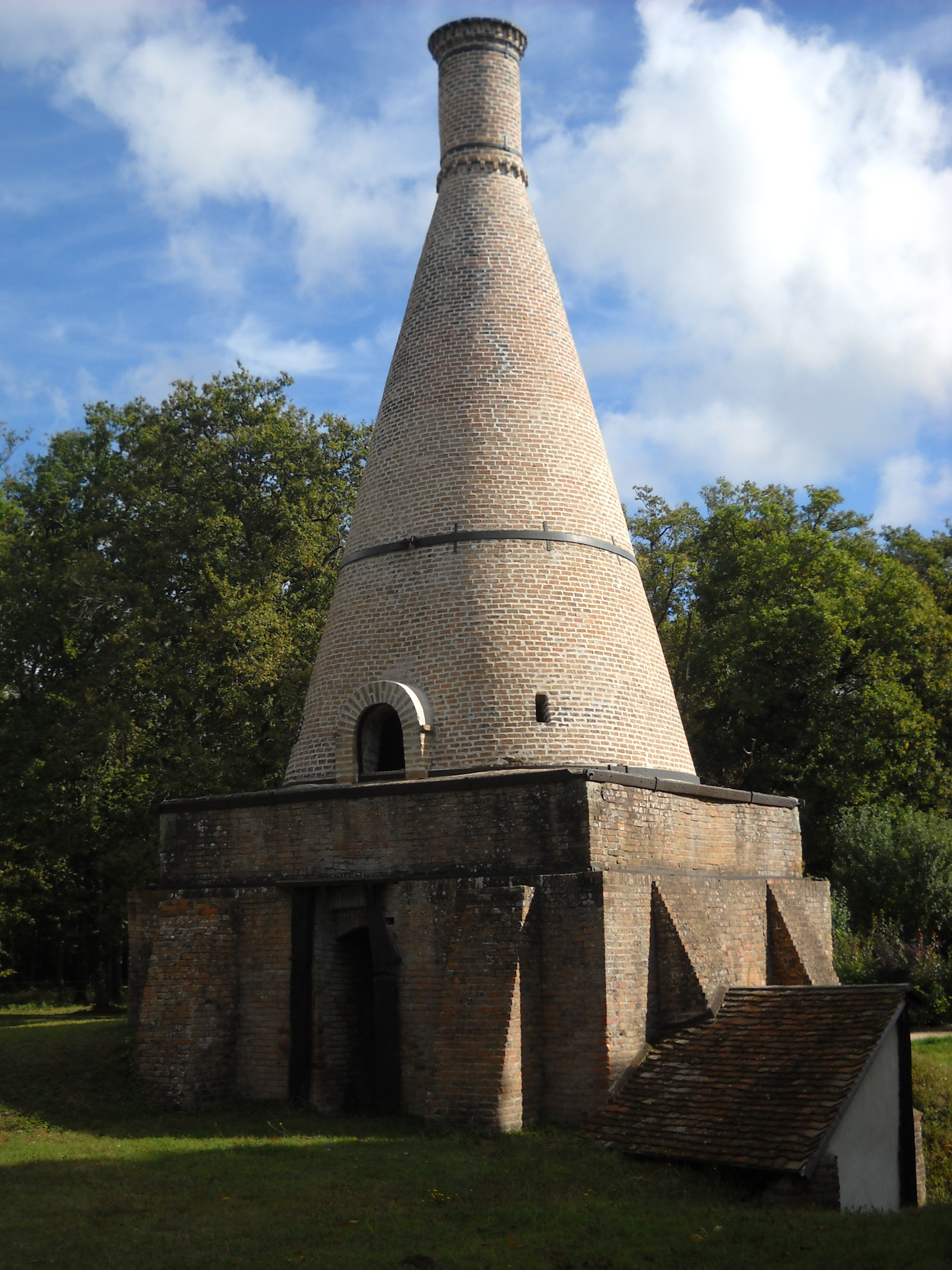
- The Tuilerie d'Alosse, in Marcilly-en-Villette

- Coat of arms
- Location of Marcilly-en-Villette
- Location within France Location within Centre-Val de Loire
- Coordinates: 47°45′54″N 2°01′22″E
- Country: France
- Region: Centre-Val de Loire
- Department: Loiret
- Arrondissement: Orléans
- Canton: La Ferté-Saint-Aubin
- Intercommunality: Portes de Sologne

Government
  - Mayor (2020–2026): Hervé Nieuviarts
- Area^{1}: 62.66 km^{2} (24.19 sq mi)
- Highest elevation: 136 m (446 ft)
- Lowest elevation: 97 m (318 ft)
- Population (2023): 2,180
  - Density: 34.8/km^{2} (90.1/sq mi)
- Demonym: Marcillois
- Time zone: UTC+01:00 (CET)
  - Summer (DST): UTC+02:00 (CEST)
- INSEE/Postal code: 45193 /45240
- Website: www.marcilly-en-villette.fr
- ^{1} French Land Register data, which excludes lakes, ponds, glaciers > 1 km^{2} (0.386 sq mi or 247 acres) and river estuaries.

Marcilly-en-Villette (French pronunciation: [maʁsiji ɑ̃ vilɛt]) is a commune in the Loiret department in north-central France.

== Population ==
Historical population
Year	Pop.	±% p.a.
1968	833	—
1975	1,010	+2.79%
1982	1,401	+4.79%
1990	1,714	+2.55%
1999	1,900	+1.15%
2007	1,943	+0.28%
2012	2,032	+0.90%
2017	2,124	+0.89%
2023	2,180	+0.43%
Source: INSEE

== See also ==
- Communes of the Loiret department
