= Isdes, Loiret =

Isdes
- Commune
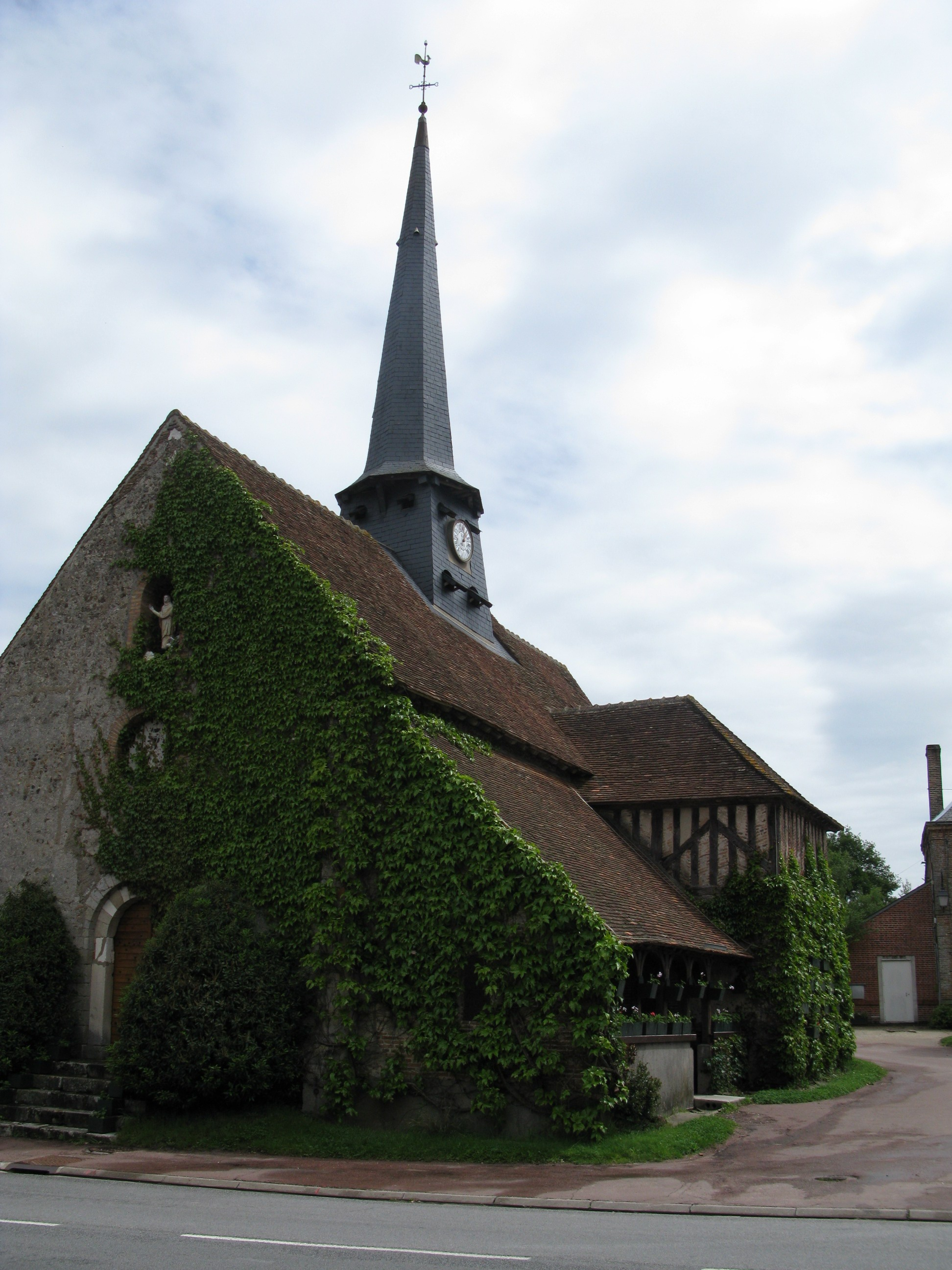
- The church of Notre Dame d'Isdes, May 2009

- Coat of arms
- Location of Isdes
- Location within France Location within Centre-Val de Loire
- Coordinates: 47°40′17″N 2°15′22″E
- Country: France
- Region: Centre-Val de Loire
- Department: Loiret
- Arrondissement: Orléans
- Canton: Sully-sur-Loire

Government
  - Mayor (2020–2026): Christian Colas
- Area^{1}: 43.89 km^{2} (16.95 sq mi)
- Highest elevation: 157 m (515 ft)
- Lowest elevation: 129 m (423 ft)
- Population (2023): 524
  - Density: 11.9/km^{2} (30.9/sq mi)
- Demonym: Isdois
- Time zone: UTC+01:00 (CET)
  - Summer (DST): UTC+02:00 (CEST)
- INSEE/Postal code: 45171 /45620
- ^{1} French Land Register data, which excludes lakes, ponds, glaciers > 1 km^{2} (0.386 sq mi or 247 acres) and river estuaries.

Isdes (French pronunciation: [id]) is a commune in the Loiret department in north-central France.

Its population was 552 in 2018. It has an area of 43.89 km^{2} and it lies at an altitude 149 m above sea level.

In 2007 Isdes was recognized as a "Village Fleuri" (Village of Flowers), for its outstanding decor of flora and fauna.

The church of Notre Dame d'Isdes (Our Lady of Isdes), built between the 11th and 13th century, lies inside the village. The commune is also home to the Sainte Claire manor, built in 1865.

Isdes is twinned with the village of Lužice in Czech Republic.

== See also ==
- Communes of the Loiret department
