= Bourdin =

Bourdin is a French surname. Notable people with the surname include:

- Claude Bourdin (1943–2025), French politician
- Françoise Bourdin (1952–2022), French author
- Frédéric Bourdin (born 1974), French impostor
- Gilbert Bourdin (1923–1998), founder of Aumism
- Guy Bourdin (1928–1991), French artist and photographer
- Jacques Bourdin (died 1567), French diplomat
- Jean-Jacques Bourdin (born 1949), French journalist and television presenter
- Joël Bourdin (1938–2025), French politician
- Lise Bourdin (1925–2025), French actress
- Martial Bourdin (1868–1894), French anarchist
- Pierre Bourdin (born 1994), French footballer
- Roger Bourdin (1900–1973), French baritone
- Roger Bourdin (1923–1976), French flautist
- Thierry Bourdin (born 1962), French wrestler

== See also ==
- Bourdain
