= Villemurlin =

- Commune
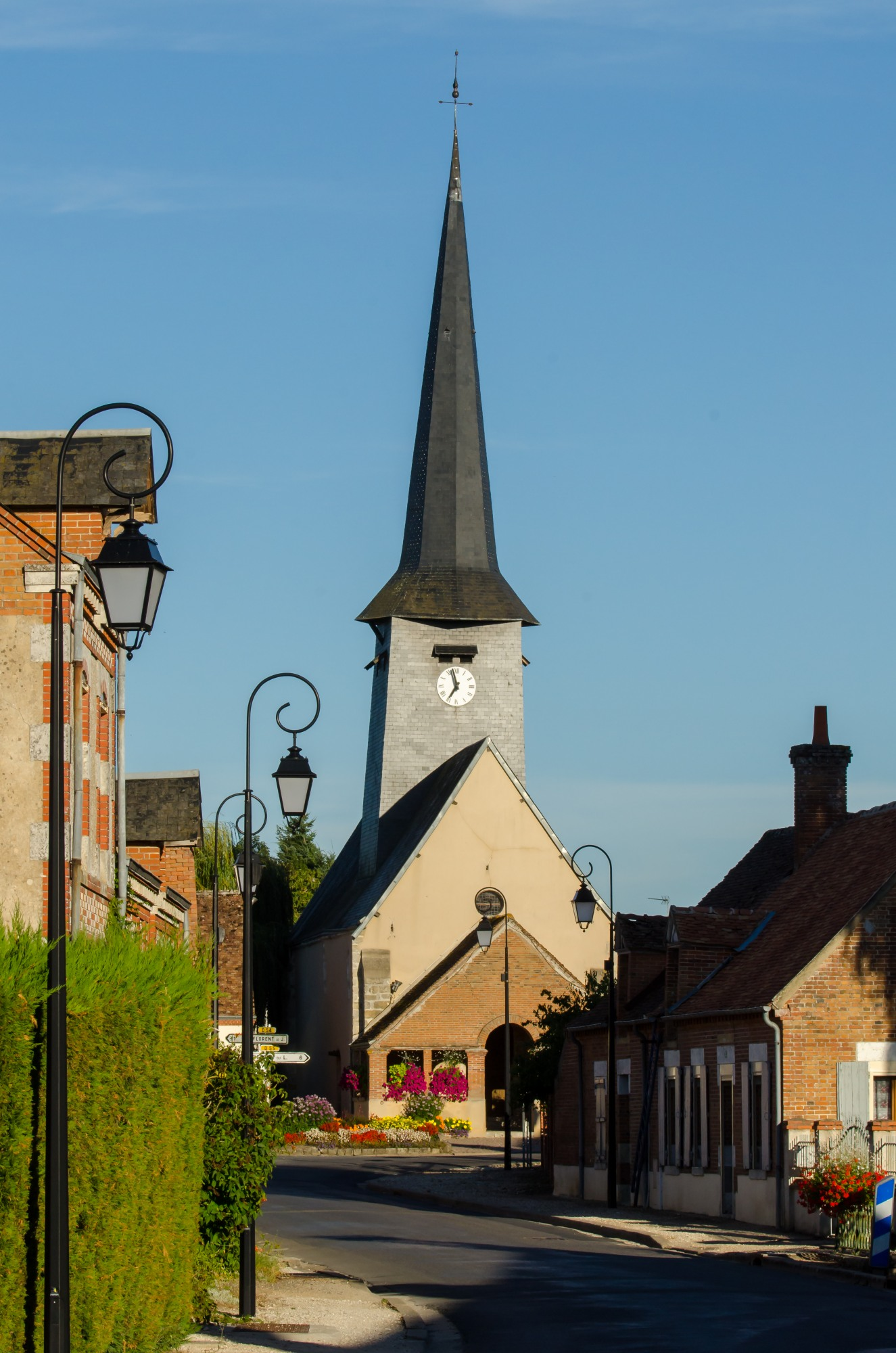
- The church in Villemurlin

- Coat of arms
- Location of Villemurlin
- Location within France Location within Centre-Val de Loire
- Coordinates: 47°41′07″N 2°20′08″E
- Country: France
- Region: Centre-Val de Loire
- Department: Loiret
- Arrondissement: Orléans
- Canton: Sully-sur-Loire

Government
  - Mayor (2020–2026): Sarah Richard
- Area^{1}: 48.95 km^{2} (18.90 sq mi)
- Highest elevation: 160 m (520 ft)
- Lowest elevation: 120 m (390 ft)
- Population (2023): 536
  - Density: 10.9/km^{2} (28.4/sq mi)
- Demonym(s): Villemurlinois, Villemurlinoises
- Time zone: UTC+01:00 (CET)
  - Summer (DST): UTC+02:00 (CEST)
- INSEE/Postal code: 45340 /45600
- Website: villemurlin.fr
- ^{1} French Land Register data, which excludes lakes, ponds, glaciers > 1 km^{2} (0.386 sq mi or 247 acres) and river estuaries.

Villemurlin (French pronunciation: [vilmyʁlɛ̃]) is a commune in the Loiret department in north-central France.

== See also ==
- Communes of the Loiret department
