= Saint-Gondon =

- Commune
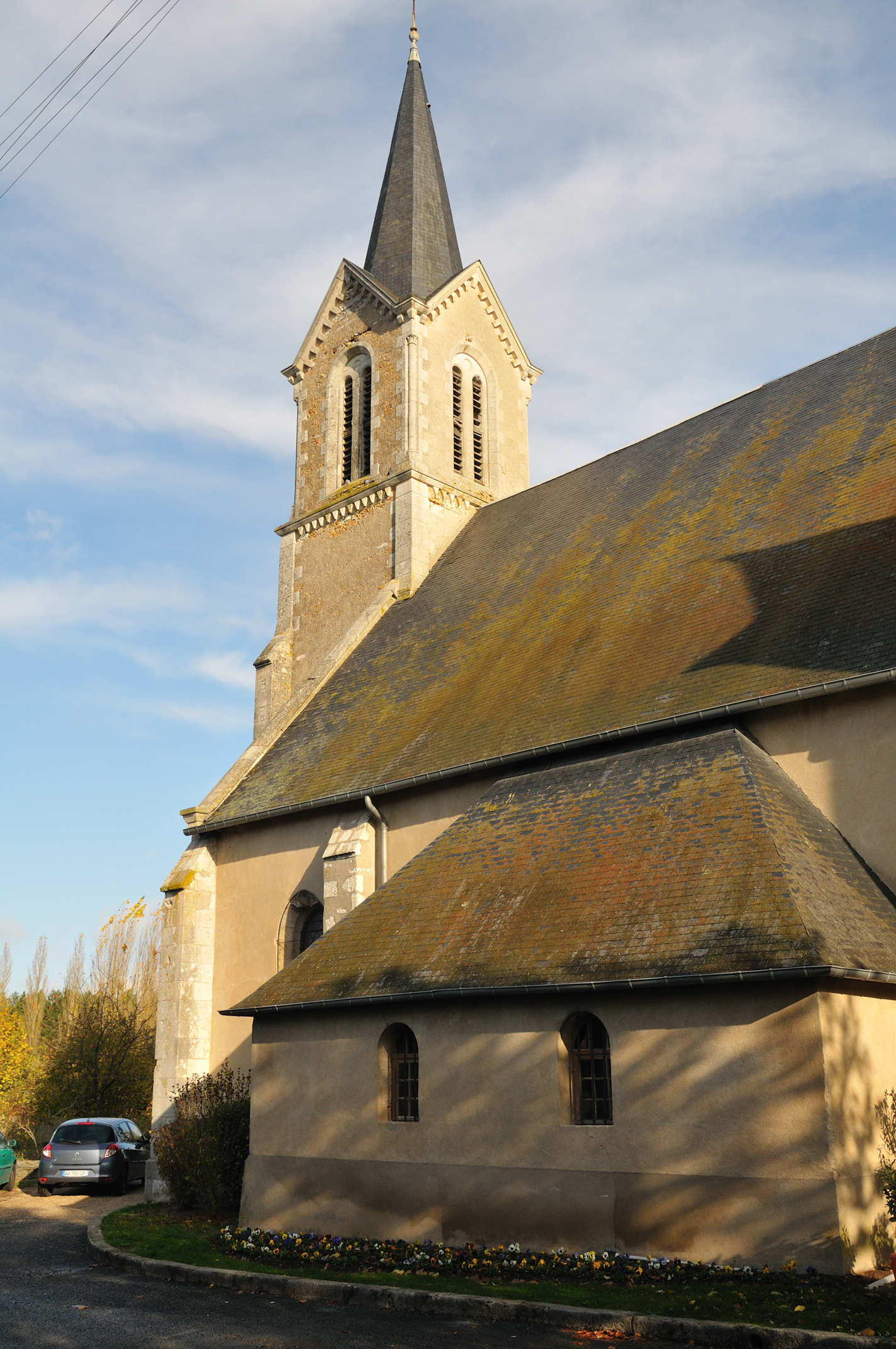
- The church in Saint-Gondon

- Coat of arms
- Location of Saint-Gondon
- Location within France Location within Centre-Val de Loire
- Coordinates: 47°41′59″N 2°32′32″E
- Country: France
- Region: Centre-Val de Loire
- Department: Loiret
- Arrondissement: Montargis
- Canton: Sully-sur-Loire
- Intercommunality: CC Giennoises

Government
  - Mayor (2020–2026): Didier Boulogne
- Area^{1}: 22.40 km^{2} (8.65 sq mi)
- Highest elevation: 164 m (538 ft)
- Lowest elevation: 117 m (384 ft)
- Population (2023): 1,038
  - Density: 46.34/km^{2} (120.0/sq mi)
- Time zone: UTC+01:00 (CET)
  - Summer (DST): UTC+02:00 (CEST)
- INSEE/Postal code: 45280 /45500
- ^{1} French Land Register data, which excludes lakes, ponds, glaciers > 1 km^{2} (0.386 sq mi or 247 acres) and river estuaries.

Saint-Gondon (French pronunciation: [sɛ̃ ɡɔ̃dɔ̃]) is a commune in the Loiret department in north-central France.

== See also ==
- Communes of the Loiret department
