= Stéphanie Rist =

French politician (born 1973)

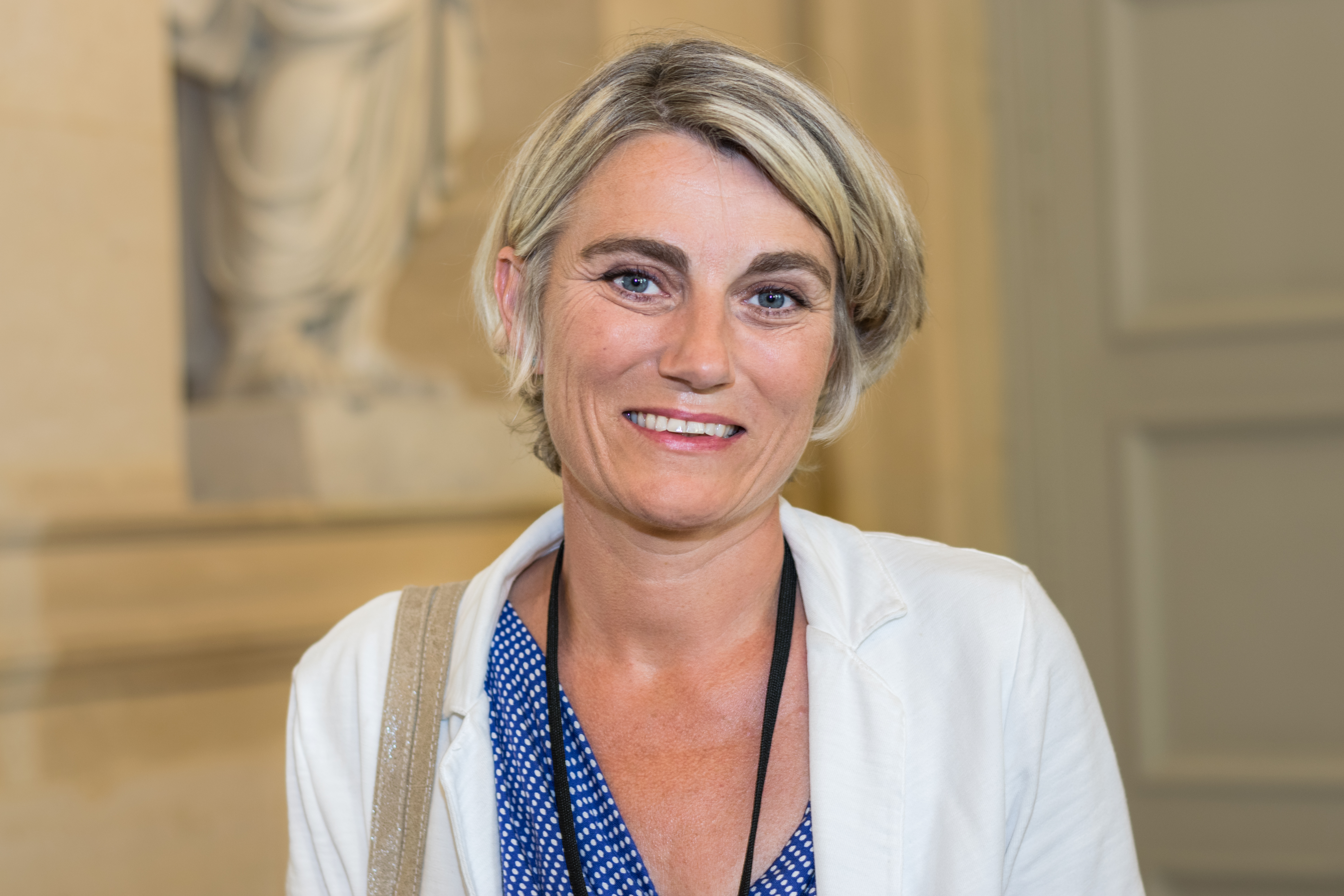

Minister of Health, Families, Autonomy and Disabled People
- Incumbent
- Assumed office 12 October 2025
- Prime Minister: Sébastien Lecornu
- Preceded by: Catherine Vautrin

Member of the National Assembly for Loiret's 1st constituency
- In office 21 June 2017 – 12 November 2025
- Preceded by: Olivier Carré
- Succeeded by: Stéphane Chouin

Personal details
- Born: 6 August 1973 (age 53) Athis-Mons, France
- Party: Renaissance (2016–present)
- Education: University of Tours; Sciences Po
- Profession: Rheumatologist

Stéphanie Rist (French pronunciation: [stefani ʁist]; born 6 August 1973) is a French rheumatologist and politician of Renaissance who has served as Minister of Health, Families, Autonomy and Disabled People in the second government of Prime Minister Sébastien Lecornu since 12 October 2025.

Rist previously served as a member of the National Assembly from the 2017 legislative election, representing the department of Loiret.

== Early career ==
Rist began her career at the Hôpital Louis-Mourier in Colombes, Greater Paris, before becoming in 2005 a hospital-based rheumatologist at the Regional Hospital Centre (CHU) of Orléans.

== Political career ==
Rist joined En Marche (later La République En Marche! and Renaissance) in 2016.

In the 2017 legislative election, she won Loiret's 1st constituency with 65% of the second-round vote against Charles-Éric Lemaignen of The Republicans (LR) after outgoing deputy Olivier Carré (LR) declined to seek a third term.

In Parliament, Rist was a member of the Committee on Cultural Affairs and Education from 2017 to 2018 and of the Committee on Social Affairs from 2018 until 2025. In this capacity, she authored a 2020 law on healthcare reforms amid the COVID-19 pandemic in France. During the COVID-19 pandemic, she returned to work in hospital. From 2022 to 2024 for the 16th legislature, she served as the National Assembly's lead rapporteur on social security in France. In addition to her committee assignments, Rist was part of a parliamentary working group on Libya.

In 2020, Rist was elected a municipal councillor of Orléans on the list of outgoing mayor Olivier Carré. She won re-election to the National Assembly in 2022 and 2024 with 57.2% and 67.6% of the second-round vote, respectively.

In 2025, Rist was appointed to the second government of Prime Minister Sébastien Lecornu as Minister of Health, Families, Autonomy and Disabled People.

== Political positions ==
In July 2019, Rist voted in favour of the French ratification of the European Union's Comprehensive Economic and Trade Agreement (CETA) with Canada.
