= Olivier Carré =

French politician (born 1961)

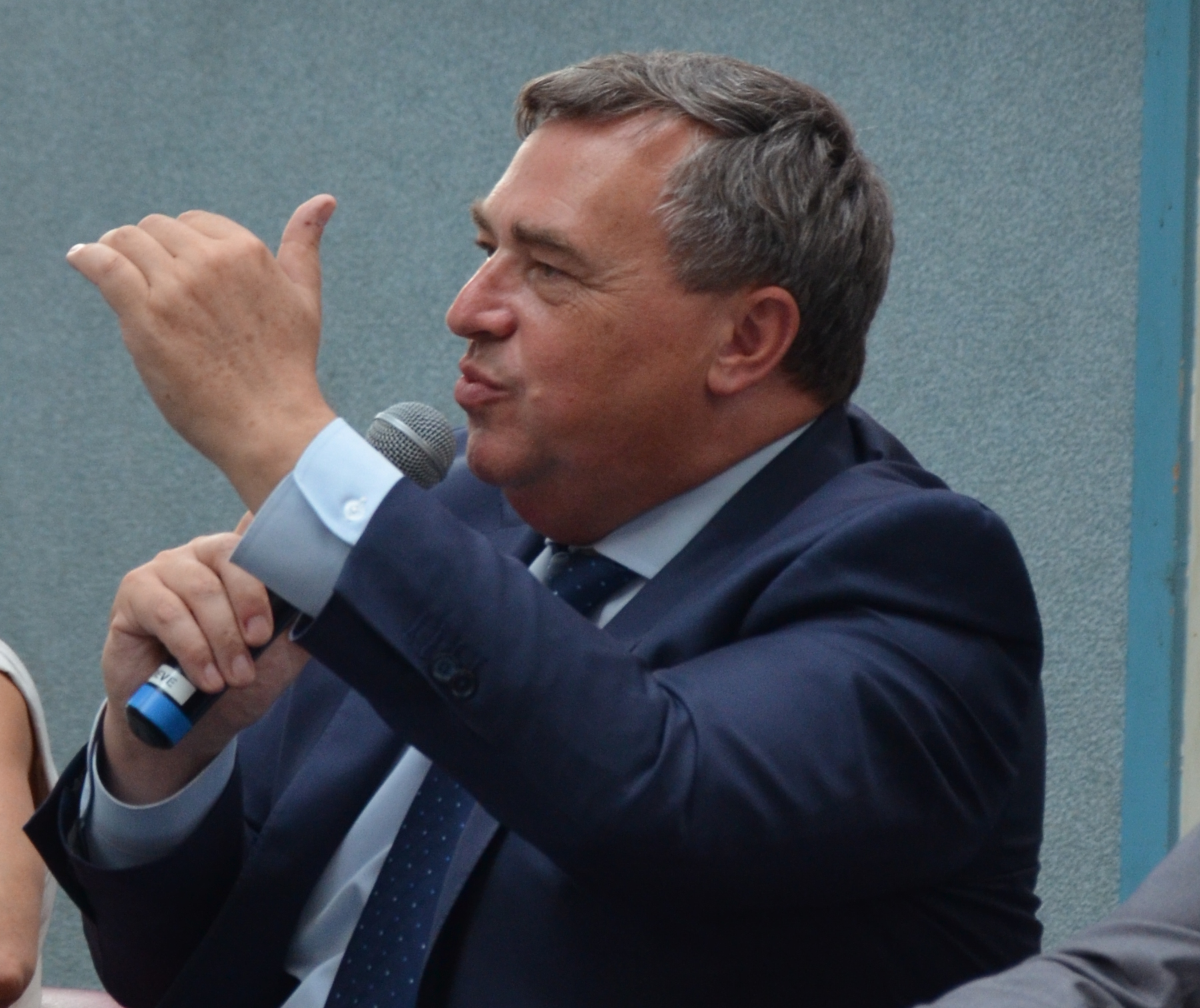

Mayor of Orléans
- In office 28 June 2015 – 28 June 2020
- Preceded by: Serge Grouard
- Succeeded by: Serge Grouard

Member of the National Assembly for Loiret's 1st constituency
- In office 2007–2017
- Preceded by: Antoine Carré
- Succeeded by: Stéphanie Rist

Personal details
- Born: 16 March 1961 (age 65) Orléans, France
- Party: Independent
- Education: University of Orléans

Olivier Carré (born 16 March 1961) is a French independent politician who served as the mayor of the city of Orléans from 2015 to 2020.

== Political career ==
Carré was member of the National Assembly of France from 2007 to 2017, representing Loiret's 1st constituency. He was a member of the Republicans (LR) until 2017. He was member of the Economic, Environmental and Regional Planning Committee.

== Political positions ==
In 2019, Carré publicly declared his support for incumbent President Emmanuel Macron.
