= Canton of Orléans-2 =

Coordinates: 47.89°N 1.90°E

The canton of Orléans-2 is an administrative division of the Loiret department in central France. It was created at the French canton reorganisation which went into effect in March 2015. Its seat is in Orléans.

It consists of the following communes:

1. Orléans (partly)
