= Arrondissements of the Loiret department =

Administrative divisions of Loiret, France

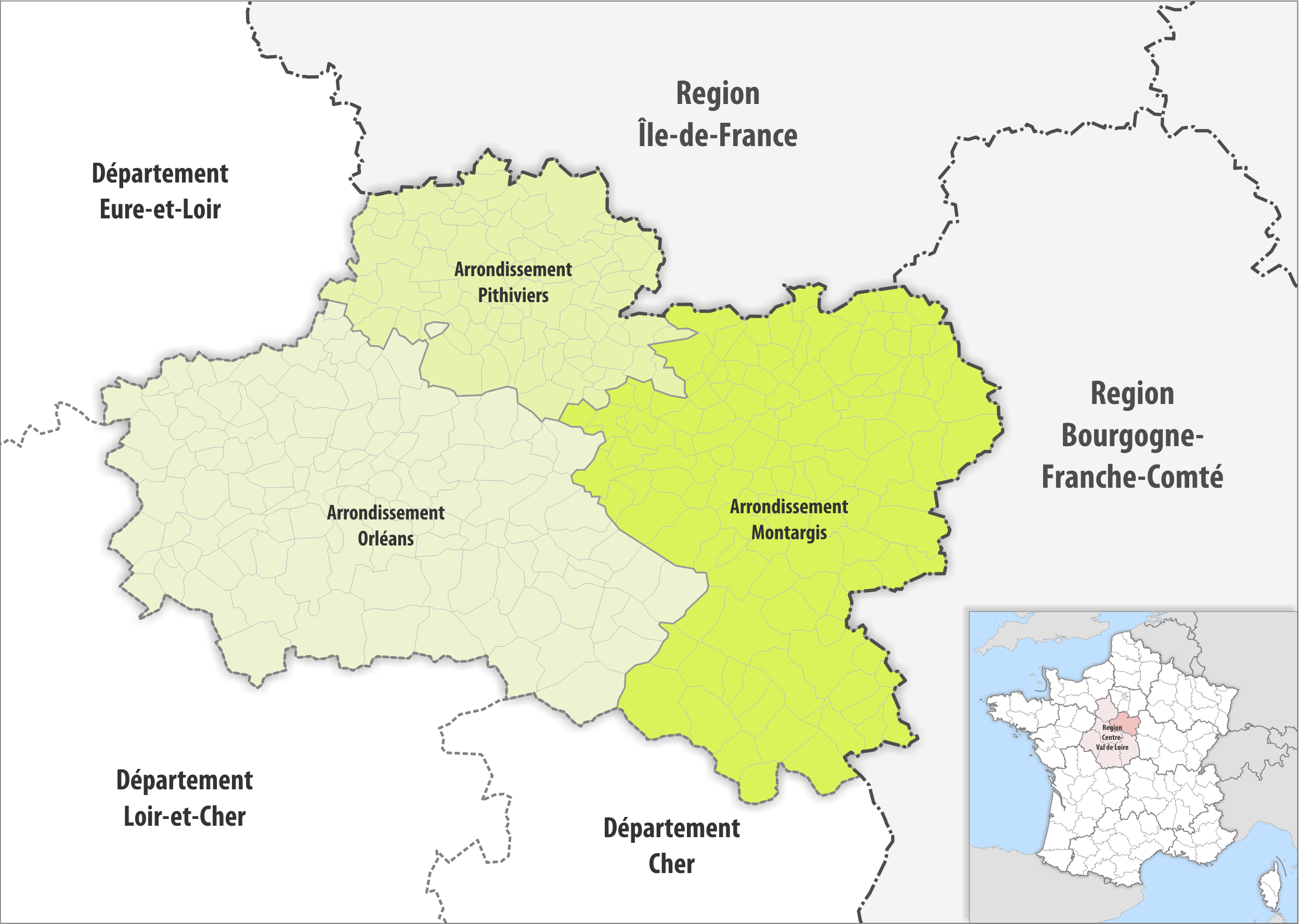
Map of arrondissements of the Loiret department.

The 3 arrondissements of the Loiret department are:

1. Arrondissement of Montargis, (subprefecture: Montargis) with 125 communes. The population of the arrondissement was 168,666 in 2021.
2. Arrondissement of Orléans, (prefecture of the Loiret department: Orléans) with 121 communes. The population of the arrondissement was 453,067 in 2021.
3. Arrondissement of Pithiviers, (subprefecture: Pithiviers) with 79 communes. The population of the arrondissement was 62,828 in 2021.

== History ==
In 1800 the arrondissements of Orléans, Gien, Montargis and Pithiviers were established. The arrondissements of Gien and Pithiviers were disbanded in 1926, and Pithiviers was restored in 1942.
