= Canton of Orléans-4 =

Coordinates: 47.90°N 1.91°E

The canton of Orléans-4 is an administrative division of the Loiret department, central France. It was created at the French canton reorganisation which came into effect in March 2015. Its seat is in Orléans.

It consists of the following communes:

1. Orléans (partly)
