= Canton of Sully-sur-Loire =

Coordinates: 47.76°N 2.37°E

The canton of Sully-sur-Loire is an administrative division of the Loiret department, central France. Its borders were modified at the French canton reorganisation which came into effect in March 2015. Its seat is in Sully-sur-Loire.

It consists of the following communes:

1. Bonnée
2. Les Bordes
3. Bray-Saint Aignan
4. Cerdon
5. Coullons
6. Dampierre-en-Burly
7. Germigny-des-Prés
8. Guilly
9. Isdes
10. Lion-en-Sullias
11. Neuvy-en-Sullias
12. Ouzouer-sur-Loire
13. Poilly-lez-Gien
14. Saint-Aignan-le-Jaillard
15. Saint-Benoît-sur-Loire
16. Saint-Brisson-sur-Loire
17. Saint-Florent-le-Jeune
18. Saint-Gondon
19. Saint-Martin-sur-Ocre
20. Saint-Père-sur-Loire
21. Sully-sur-Loire
22. Viglain
23. Villemurlin
