= Loiret's 1st constituency =

Constituency of the National Assembly of France

1st constituency of Loiret
- inline Constituency of the National Assembly of France

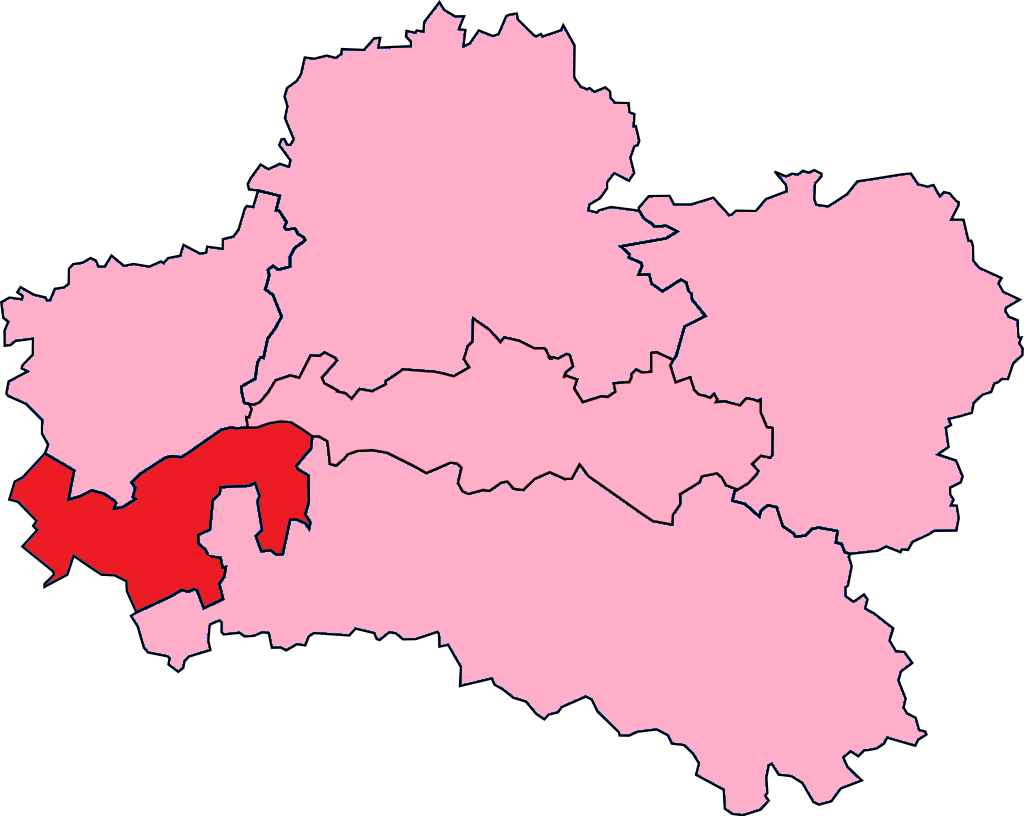
- Loiret's 1st Constituency shown within Loiret
- Deputy: Stéphanie Rist; RE
- Department: Loiret
- Cantons: Beaugency, Cléry-Saint-André, Olivet, Orléans-Saint-Marceau, Orléans-La Source, Saint-Jean-le-Blanc
- Registered voters: 75649

The 1st constituency of the Loiret (French: Première circonscription du Loiret) is a French legislative constituency in the Loiret département. Like the other 576 French constituencies, it elects one MP using a two round electoral system.

== Description ==
The 1st Constituency of the Loiret stretches from the western suburbs of Orléans towards the western edge of department.

In common with the department as a whole the seat has historically tended towards the centre right.

== Assembly Members ==
Election	Member	Party
1988	Jean-Pierre Sueur	PS
1993	Antoine Carré	UDF
1997	Antoine Carré	UDF
2002	Antoine Carré	UMP
2007	Olivier Carré	UMP
2012	Olivier Carré	UMP
2017	Stéphanie Rist	LREM
2022	Stéphanie Rist	RE
2024	Stéphanie Rist	RE

== Election results ==
=== 2024 ===
Candidate	Party	Alliance	First round			Second round		
Candidate	Party	Alliance	Votes	%	+/–	Votes	%	+/–
Stéphanie Rist	RE	Ensemble	16,775	31.60	-4.89	34,909	67.68	+10.47
Ghislaine Kounowski	PS	NFP	16,706	31.47	+2.80	withdrew		
Tiffanie Rabault	RN		14,880	28.03	+12.79	16,667	32.32	new
Guillaume Chassang	LC		3,620	6.82	new			
Nicole Maurice	REC		659	1.24	-3.17			
Claude Trepka	LO		439	0.83	-0.40			
Votes			53,079	100.00		51,576	100.00	
Valid votes			53,079	98.00	-0.08	51,576	95.22	+2.08
Blank votes			803	1.48	+0.06	1,972	3.64	-1.30
Null votes			282	0.52	+0.02	617	1.14	-0.78
Turnout			54,164	69.17	+18.81	54,165	69.19	+20.42
Abstentions			24,145	30.83	-18.81	24,117	30.81	-20.42
Registered voters			78,309			78,282		
Result			RE HOLD					

=== 2022 ===
Legislative Election 2022: Loiret's 1st constituency
Party	Candidate	Votes	%	±%
LREM (Ensemble)	Stéphanie Rist	13,988	36.49	-8.18
PS (NUPÉS)	Ghislaine Kounowski	10,989	28.67	+7.05
RN	François-Valbert Helie	5,842	15.24	+5.42
UDI (UDC)	Thierry Cousin	4,621	12.06	−6.38
REC	Patricia Lequen	1,689	4.41	N/A
DLF	Sabryna Khider	496	1.29	N/A
LO	Claude Trepka	470	1.23	N/A
UDMF	Dounia Khuwaylid	235	0.61	N/A
2nd round result
LREM (Ensemble)	Stéphanie Rist	20,163	57.21	-7.81
PS (NUPÉS)	Ghislaine Kounowski	15,080	42.79	N/A
Turnout		35,243	48.77	+8.11
LREM hold				

=== 2017 ===
Legislative Election 2017: Loiret's 1st constituency
Party	Candidate	Votes	%	±%
LREM	Stéphanie Rist	17,409	44.67	N/A
LR	Charles-Eric Lemaignen	7,189	18.44	−20.05
FN	Colette Poltaratsky	3,827	9.82	−3.29
PS	Olivier Jouin	3,382	8.68	N/A
LFI	Anne-Sophie Leguin	3,309	8.49	N/A
PCF	Michel Ricoud	1,733	4.45	−2.54
DLF	Daniel Simon	867	2.22	N/A
Others	N/A	1,260	3.23	+0.58
Turnout		38,976	51.52	−7.20
2nd round result
LREM	Stéphanie Rist	20,001	65.02	N/A
LR	Charles-Eric Lemaignen	10,759	34.98	−16.86
Turnout		30,760	40.66	−16.87
LREM gain from LR				

=== 2012 ===
Legislative Election 2012: Loiret's 1st constituency
Party	Candidate	Votes	%	±%
UMP	Olivier Carré	16,559	38.49	−4.59
EELV	Jean-Philippe Grand	13,650	31.73	+27.53
FN	Dominique Sanguinetti	5,639	13.11	+9.36
FG	Cécile Hubert	3,008	6.99	+3.23
DVG	Ibrahim Choucair	1,918	4.46	N/A
MoDem	Tahar Ben Chaabane	1,105	2.57	−7.10
Others	N/A	1,143	2.65	−1.99
Turnout		43,023	58.72	−3.10
2nd round result
UMP	Olivier Carré	21,846	51.84	−3.11
EELV	Jean-Philippe Grand	20,298	48.16	N/A
Turnout		42,144	57.53	−2.06
UMP hold				

=== 2007 ===
Legislative Election 2007: Loiret's 1st constituency
Party	Candidate	Votes	%	±%
UMP	Olivier Carre	21,701	43.08	−3.96
PS	Marie-Madeleine Mialot	13,450	26.70	−1.31
MoDem	Yves Clement	4,869	9.67	N/A
DVD	Annick Courtat	2,117	4.20	N/A
LV	Jean-Philippe Grand	2,117	4.20	+0.98
PCF	Michel Ricoud	1,893	3.76	+0.63
FN	Bruno Agius	1,887	3.75	−5.08
Others	N/A	2,340	4.64	−5.13
Turnout		51,110	61.82	−4.68
Registered electors		82,678		
2nd round result
UMP	Olivier Carre	26,386	54.95	−4.51
PS	Marie-Madeleine Mialot	21,628	45.05	+4.51
Turnout		49,263	59.59	−2.33
Registered electors		82,673		
UMP hold				

=== 2002 ===
Legislative Election 2002: Loiret's 1st constituency
Party	Candidate	Votes	%	±%
UMP	Antoine Carré	23,880	47.04	N/A
PS	Jean-Pierre Delport	14,218	28.01	−4.91
FN	Jeanne Legros	4,482	8.83	−3.48
LV	Nino-Anne Dupleux	1,636	3.22	+0.12
PCF	Marc Brynhole	1,590	3.13	−2.91
Others	N/A	4,959	9.77	+4.12
Turnout		51,681	66.50	−2.34
Registered electors		77,171		
2nd round result
UMP	Antoine Carré	27,604	59.46	N/A
PS	Jean-Pierre Delport	18,821	40.54	−8.33
Turnout		48,128	61.92	−12.28
Registered electors		77,720		
UMP gain from PR				

=== 1997 ===
Legislative Election 1997: Loiret's 1st constituency
Party	Candidate	Votes	%	±%
PR (UDF)	Antoine Carré	15,790	32.99	+7.12
PS	Jean-Pierre Sueur	15,756	32.92	+6.84
FN	Xavier Guillemot	5,891	12.31	+1.98
PCF	Michel Ricoud	2,890	6.04	+0.74
LDI	Michel Brugnon	1,846	3.86	N/A
LO	Christiane Hauchère	1,499	3.13	+1.28
LV	David Martin	1,486	3.10	N/A
Others	N/A	2,705	5.65	N/A
Turnout		50,168	68.84	−4.83
Registered electors		72,871		
2nd round result
PR (UDF)	Antoine Carré	26,166	51.13	-3.84
PS	Jean-Pierre Sueur	25,005	48.87	+3.84
Turnout		54,050	74.20	−0.01
Registered electors		72,848		
PR hold				

=== 1993 ===
Legislative Election 1993: Loiret's 1st constituency
Party	Candidate	Votes	%	±%
PS	Jean-Pierre Sueur	12,789	26.08	
UDF	Antoine Carre	12,687	25.87	
RPR	Annick Courtat	9,488	19.35	
FN	Francois Cheron	5,064	10.33	
GE	Nino-Anne Dupieux	4,495	9.17	
PCF	Marc Brynholm	2,597	5.30	
EXG	Marie-Helene Soubry	1,010	2.06	
LO	Christiane Haucher	908	1.85	
NERNA	Sandrine Charasson	2	0.00	
Turnout		51,302	73.67	
Registered electors		69,635		
2nd round result
UDF	Antoine Carre	26,831	54.97	
PS	Jean-Pierre Sueur	21,981	45.03	
Turnout		51.664	74.21	
Registered electors		69,623		
UDF gain from PS				
