= Antoine Carré (politician) =

French politician (born 1943)

Member of the National Assembly for Loiret's 1st constituency
- In office 1993–2007
- Preceded by: Jean-Pierre Sueur
- Succeeded by: Olivier Carré

Mayor of Saint-Jean-le-Blanc
- In office 1977–2001
- Succeeded by: André Boulard

Personal details
- Born: 4 March 1943 (age 83) Fleury-les-Aubrais, France
- Party: UMP

Antoine Carré (born 4 March 1943 in Fleury-les-Aubrais) is a former member of the National Assembly of France. He represented Loiret's 1st constituency, and is a member of the Union for a Popular Movement.
