= Canton of La Ferté-Saint-Aubin =

Coordinates: 47.72°N 1.94°E

The canton of La Ferté-Saint-Aubin is an administrative division of the Loiret department, central France. Its borders were modified at the French canton reorganisation which came into effect in March 2015. Its seat is in La Ferté-Saint-Aubin.

It consists of the following communes:

1. Ardon
2. La Ferté-Saint-Aubin
3. Ligny-le-Ribault
4. Marcilly-en-Villette
5. Ménestreau-en-Villette
6. Orléans (partly)
7. Saint-Cyr-en-Val
8. Sennely
