= Loiret =

Department in Centre-Val de Loire, France

- Department of France
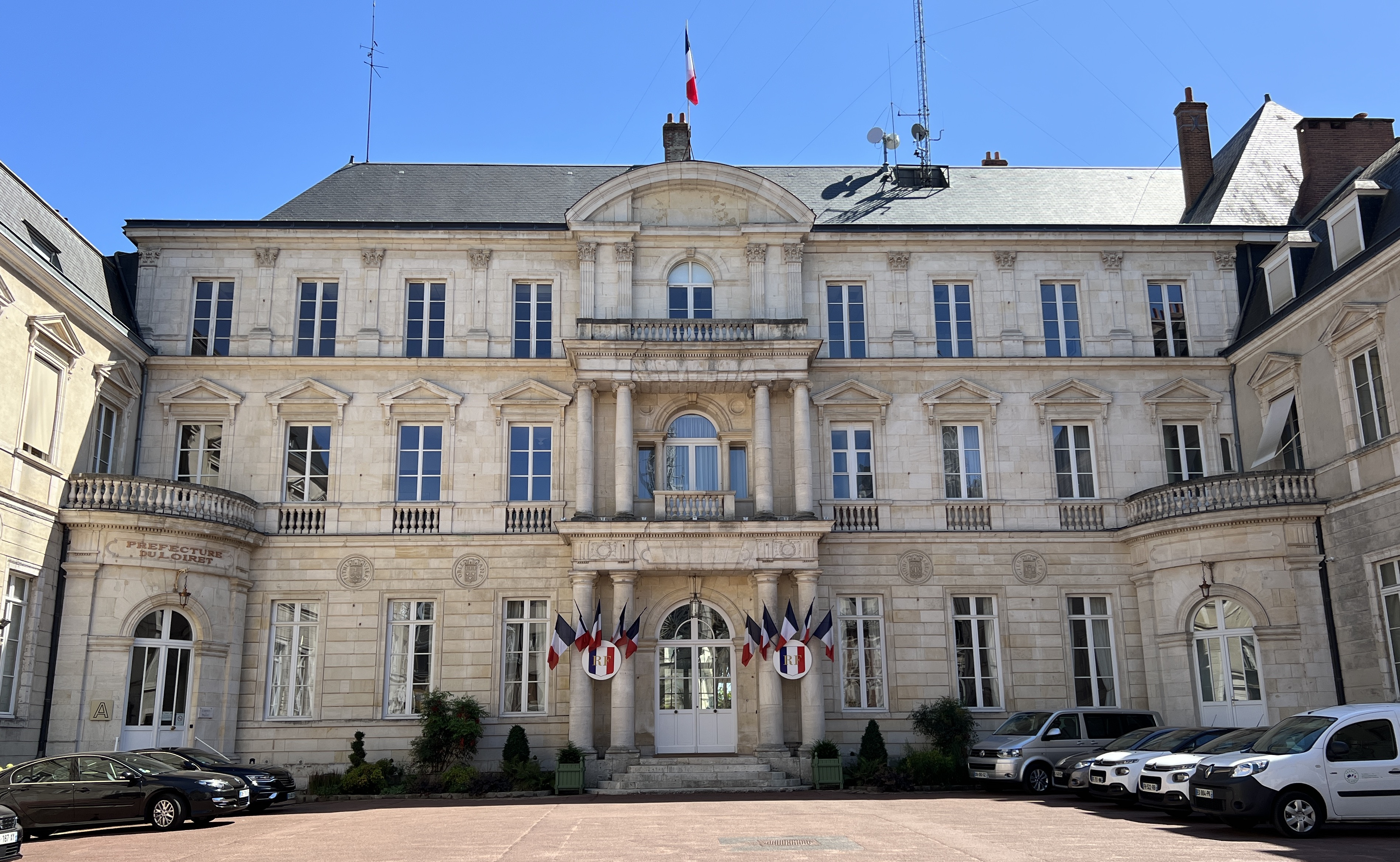
- Prefecture building in Orléans

- Flag Coat of arms

- Location of Loiret in France
- Coordinates: 47°55′N 02°10′E
- Country: France
- Region: Centre-Val de Loire
- Prefecture: Orléans
- Subprefectures: Montargis; Pithiviers

Government
  - President of the Departmental Council: Marc Gaudet (UDI)

Area^{1}
  - Total: 6,775 km^{2} (2,616 sq mi)

Population (2023)
  - Total: 691,268
  - Rank: 37th
  - Density: 102.0/km^{2} (264.3/sq mi)
- Time zone: UTC+1 (CET)
  - Summer (DST): UTC+2 (CEST)
- ISO 3166 code: FR-45
- Department number: 45
- Arrondissements: 3
- Cantons: 21
- Communes: 325
- ^1 French Land Register data, which exclude estuaries and lakes, ponds and glaciers larger than 1 km^{2}

Loiret (/lwɑːˈreɪ/; French: [lwaʁɛ]) is a department in the Centre-Val de Loire region of north-central France. It takes its name from the river Loiret, which is contained wholly within the department. In 2023, Loiret had a population of 691,268.

Its prefecture is Orléans, which is about 110 km (68 mi) southwest of Paris. As well as being the regional prefecture, it is a historic city on the banks of the Loire. It has a large central area with many historic buildings and mansions. Orléans Cathedral, dating back to the 13th century, was rebuilt after Protestant forces destroyed it in 1568. Loiret has two subprefectures, in Montargis and Pithiviers. It is famous for its several châteaux.

== History ==
Loiret is one of the original 83 departments that was created during the French Revolution on March 4, 1790, by order of the National Constituent Assembly. The new departments were to be uniformly administered and approximately equal to one another in size and population. It was created from the former province of Orléanais which was too large to continue in its previous form.

The Loire Valley was occupied in Palaeolithic times as attested by numerous archaeological sites in the department. The Celts were here, bringing crafts and trades, and the Romans occupied the area after the Gallic Wars. They built roads and founded cities such as Cenabum, on the site of present-day Orléans, and Sceaux-du-Gâtinais. Around 451, the Huns invaded the region but were repelled before reaching Cenabum. The Franks reached the Loire and Clovis I reigned in the area. A time of peace and prosperity ensued during the reign of Charlemagne.

== Geography ==
Loiret is one of six departments in the region Centre-Val de Loire. To the north of Loiret lie the departments of Eure-et-Loir, Essonne and Seine-et-Marne, to the east lies Yonne, to the southeast Nièvre, to the south Cher, and to the west Loir-et-Cher.

The department consists of mostly flat low-lying land through which flows the river Loire. This river enters the department near Châtillon-sur-Loire in the southeast, flows northwestwards to Orleans where it turns to flow south west, leaving the department near Beaugency. The Canal d'Orléans connects the Loire at Orléans to a junction with the Canal du Loing and the Canal de Briare in the village of Buges near Montargis. The Loire and these canals formed important trading routes before the arrival of the railways. The river Loiret, after which the department is named, is 12 km (7 mi) long and joins the Loire southwest of Orléans. Its source is at Orléans-la-Source, and its mouth at Saint-Hilaire-Saint-Mesmin. Other rivers in the department, are the Loing, a right-bank tributary of the Loire, and the Ouanne which flows into the Loing.

The department has a total area of 6,757 km^{2} (2,609 mi^{2}) and is 119 km (74 mi) from west to east and 77 km (48 mi) from north to south. Large parts of the land are used for agriculture, and these are separated by low wooded hills and some forested areas. The northwestern part of the department is in the wheat-growing region known as Beauce, an undulating plateau with some of France's best agricultural land. This area was popular with the French aristocracy in the Middle Ages and the Renaissance period, and there are many historic châteaux in the department including Château d'Augerville, Château de Bellegarde, Château de Gien, Château du Hallier, Château de Meung-sur-Loire, Château de Sully-sur-Loire and Château de Trousse-Barrière.

The part of the department south of the Loire is known as the Sologne and is an area of heathland and marshland, interspersed by hills where vines are grown. The eastern part of the department is known as Gâtinais and was part of a province of that name. Until the beginning of the 21st century, it used to be renowned for the production of saffron, but the crop could not be mechanised, and production dwindled as the cost of production became too high.

== Demography ==
Historical population

Year	Pop.	±% p.a.
1801	286,050	—
1806	285,315	−0.05%
1821	291,294	+0.14%
1831	305,276	+0.47%
1841	318,452	+0.42%
1851	341,029	+0.69%
1861	352,757	+0.34%
1872	353,021	+0.01%
1881	368,526	+0.48%
1891	377,718	+0.25%
1901	366,660	−0.30%
1911	364,061	−0.07%
1921	337,224	−0.76%
1931	342,679	+0.16%

Year	Pop.	±% p.a.
1936	343,865	+0.07%
1946	346,918	+0.09%
1954	360,523	+0.48%
1962	389,854	+0.98%
1968	430,629	+1.67%
1975	490,189	+1.87%
1982	535,669	+1.28%
1990	580,612	+1.01%
1999	618,126	+0.70%
2007	647,733	+0.59%
2012	662,297	+0.45%
2017	678,105	+0.47%
2023	691,268	+0.32%

=== Principal towns ===
The most populous commune is Orléans, the prefecture. As of 2023, there are 6 communes with more than 15,000 inhabitants, all of which are part of the agglomeration of Orléans:

Commune	Population (2023)
Orléans	116,357
Olivet	23,507
Saint-Jean-de-Braye	23,147
Fleury-les-Aubrais	21,804
Saran	17,316
Saint-Jean-de-la-Ruelle	16,768

== Economy ==
Of the 1,669,332 acres (675,555 ha) of land in the department, 975,000 acres (395,000 ha) are arable, 100,000 acres (40,000 ha) are vines, 60,000 acres (24,000 ha) are pasture, 280,000 acres (110,000 ha) are forested, 16,000 acres (6,500 ha) are plantations and orchards and 140,000 acres (57,000 ha) are unproductive moorland and heathland. The soil is in general fertile and productive; the Beauce is the main wheat-growing region, oats are widely cultivated and rye is also grown. Other crops include fruit, asparagus, saffron and herbs. Vines are cultivated and wine produced, and the area is noted for its fruit preservation. Bee-keeping also takes place and honey is produced. Loiret has little industrial development, and commerce is centred about the sale of corn, timber, cattle, chestnuts, cider, honey, flour, fruits, fish, salt, saffron and wool. The only minerals extracted are stone, limestone, marl and clay.

== Politics ==
The president of the Departmental Council is Marc Gaudet, elected in 2017.

=== Current National Assembly Representatives ===
Constituency	Member	Party
Loiret's 1st constituency	Stéphanie Rist	Renaissance
Loiret's 2nd constituency	Emmanuel Duplessy	Génération.s
Loiret's 3rd constituency	Constance de Pélichy	Miscellaneous right
Loiret's 4th constituency	Thomas Ménagé	National Rally
Loiret's 5th constituency	Anthony Brosse	Renaissance
Loiret's 6th constituency	Richard Ramos	MoDem

== Transport ==
The department benefits from its proximity to Paris to which it has good transport links. Orléans does not yet have a TGV but is connected to Paris via fast express trains. The A71 autoroute links Paris with Orléans and Clermont-Ferrand, the A10 autoroute links Paris with Orléans and Bordeaux, and the Route nationale 20 links Paris with Orléans, Limoges, Toulouse and Spain.

== Tourism ==
Orléans is a popular tourist destination and is associated with Joan of Arc. The Cathedral of Sainte-Croix was built in the Gothic style between 1278 and 1329, destroyed by Protestant forces in 1568, and rebuilt between the 17th and 19th centuries.

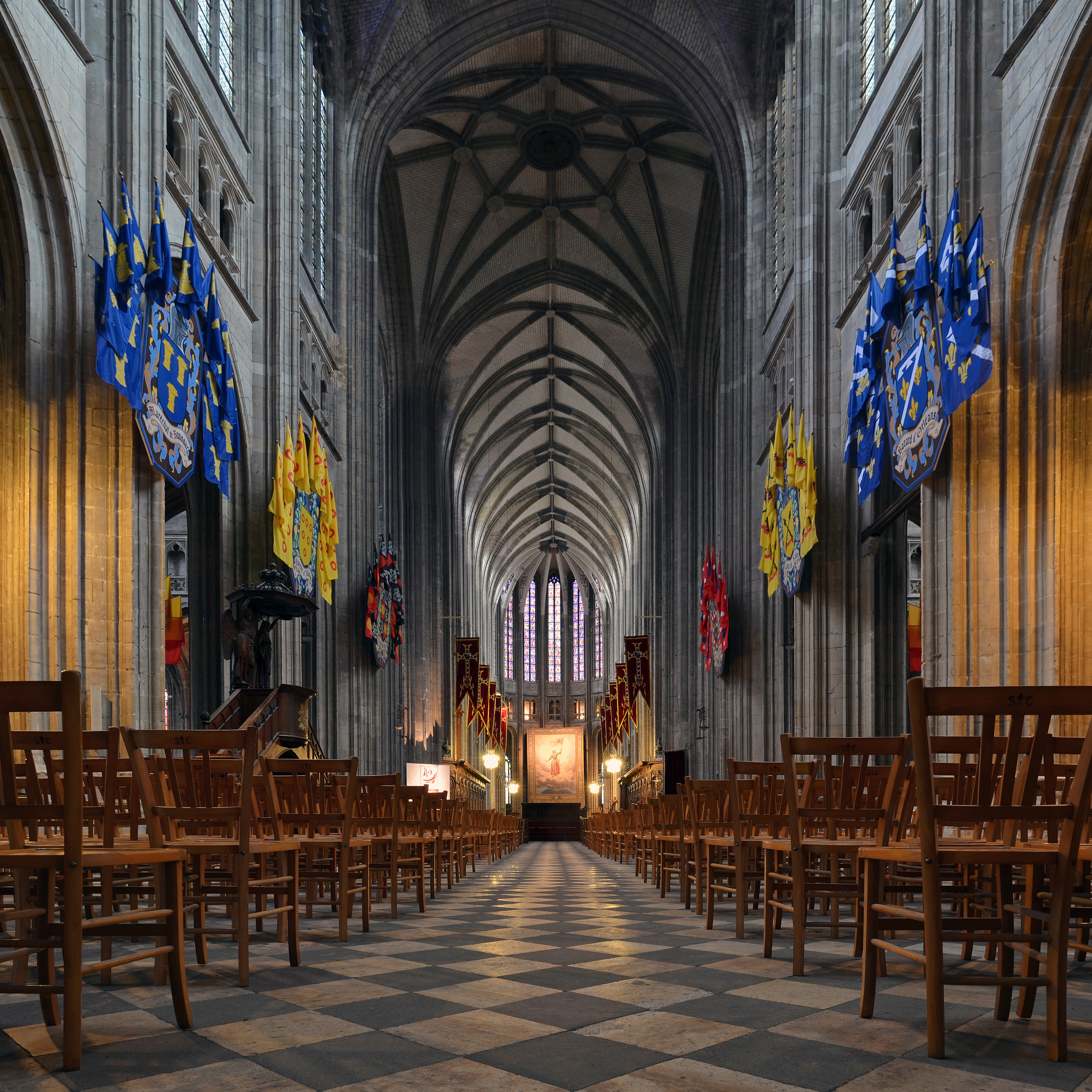
Orléans Cathedral

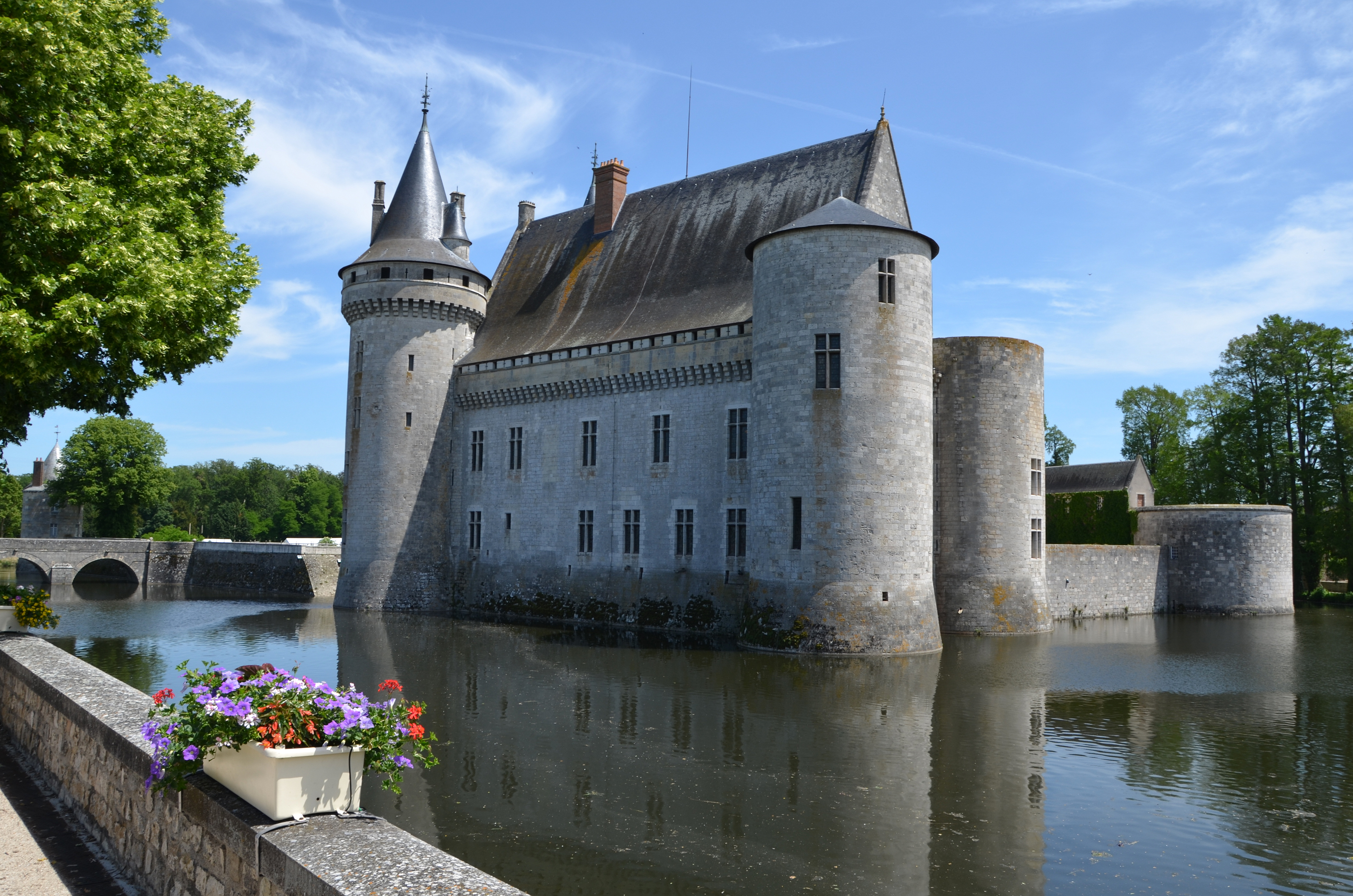
Château de Sully-sur-Loire

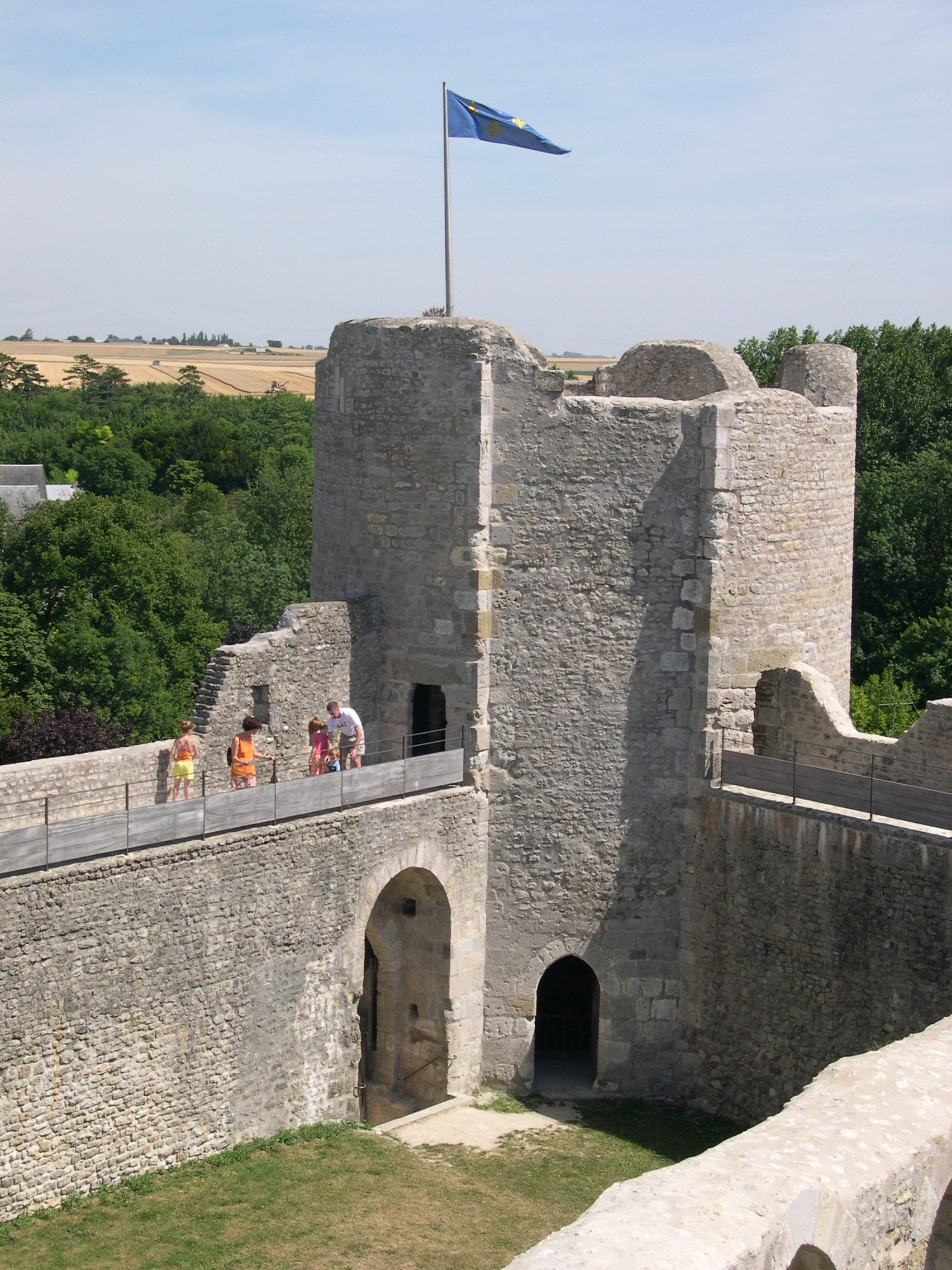
Yèvre-le-Châtel

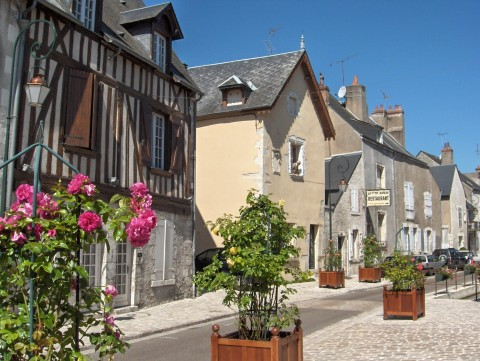
Beaugency

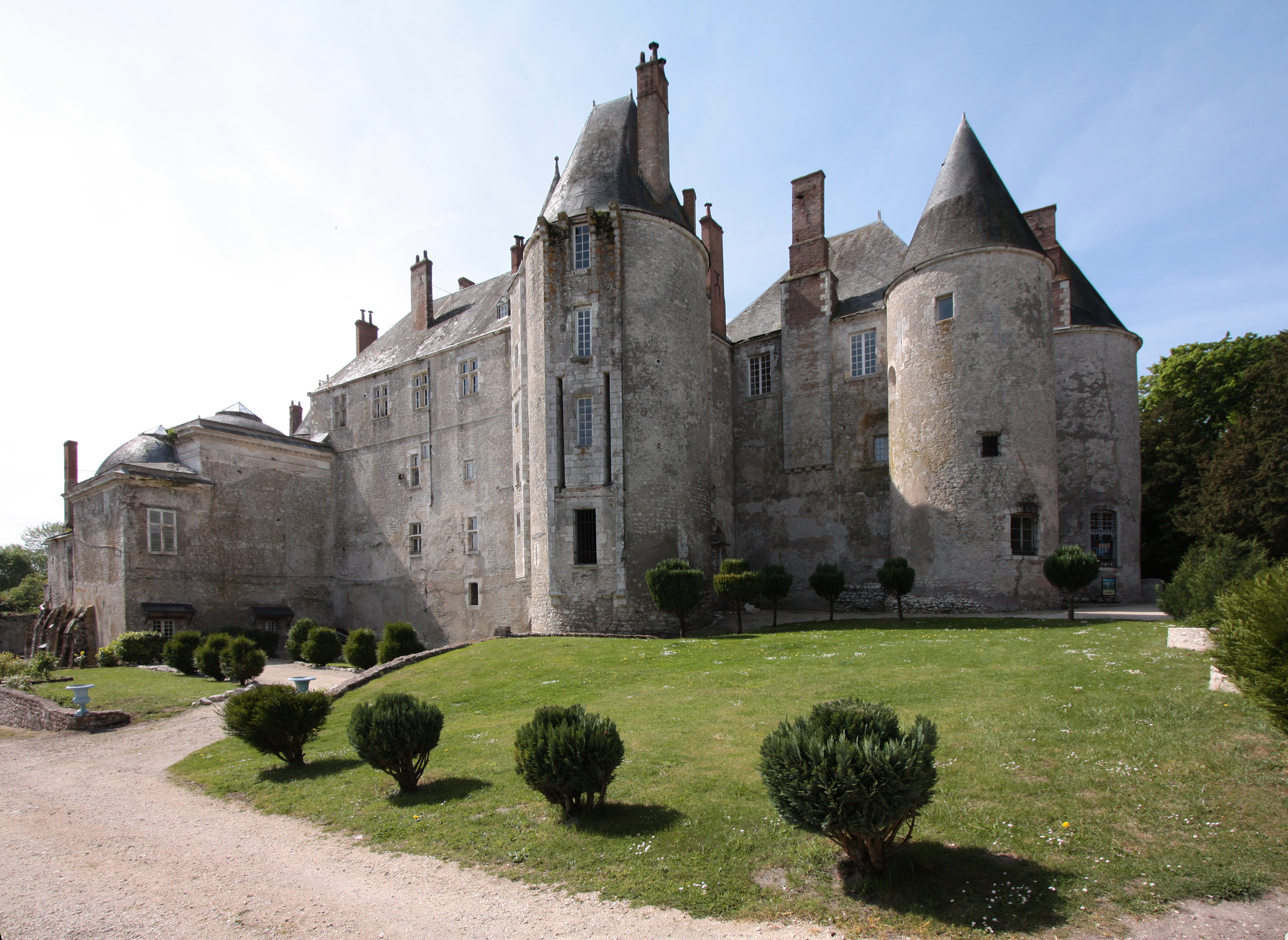
Meung-sur-Loire

== See also ==
- Cantons of the Loiret department
- Communes of the Loiret department
- Arrondissements of the Loiret department
