= History of the Departmental Council of Loiret =

History of the departmental institution

The history of the Departmental Council of Loiret traces the history of the departmental institution as a local authority from its creation in 1790 to the most recent reforms, the evolution of the administrative divisions and of the powers granted to the authority, the chronology of successive presidents, and some key dates characterizing departmental action.

The departments were created in 1790. The new administrative division was intended to allow the State to put an end to the complex network of various local constituencies, eradicate privileges and franchises, and exercise coherent power over the entire territory. For the freedom of management left to the general councillors of the time was limited. First appointed, then elected by census suffrage in 1833, by universal suffrage in 1848, the general councillors were notables in a department that remained essentially agricultural. The presidents were once again appointed by the central power from 1852 to 1870.

The law of August 10, 1871 on general councils modernized the departmental institution by giving it the institutional framework and prerogatives that would prevail, ultimately, for more than a century until the decentralization laws. Seven presidents were elected to the post of president of the general council under the Third Republic, from Louis Jahan in 1870 to Marcel Donon in 1879.

Under the Vichy regime, the sessions of general councils and departmental commissions were suspended by the law of October 12, 1940. The powers previously entrusted to them were exercised by the prefect, who was assisted by an administrative commission composed of seven to nine members appointed by decree of the Secretary of State for the Interior.

Six elected presidents held the post of president of the general council from 1945 to 1982, under the supervision of the prefect: Pierre Dézarnaulds (1945–1956), Maurice Charpentier (1956–1958), Pierre Perroy (1958–1961), Claude Lemaitre-Basset (1961–1964), Pierre Pagot (1964–1979), and Kléber Malécot (1979–1995).

The law of March 2, 1982 harmonized local authorities among themselves, stating in its first article: "Communes, departments, and regions administer themselves freely through elected councils." This measure was of crucial importance because, henceforth, not only were the deliberative bodies elected, but the executive bodies as well. It was no longer the Prefect who implemented the policies of the department, but the President of the General Council. The authority thus became fully responsible for its actions; the prefect's control would henceforth be exercised a posteriori and not a priori. The first elected official to exercise the function of president after the decentralization laws was Kléber Malécot. Éric Doligé succeeded him in 1994.

A new reform took place in 2015. The number of cantons was halved and the electoral system became mixed binomial suffrage. Each canton is represented by one man and one woman, called departmental councillors, allowing the creation of a departmental assembly with exact gender parity, whereas the rate of women's representation had previously been 31% in Loiret (13 women out of 42 elected). The powers were also redefined. Hugues Saury was elected president of this new assembly, henceforth called the departmental council.

== Formation of the department ==
=== Constitutional monarchy (1789–1792) ===
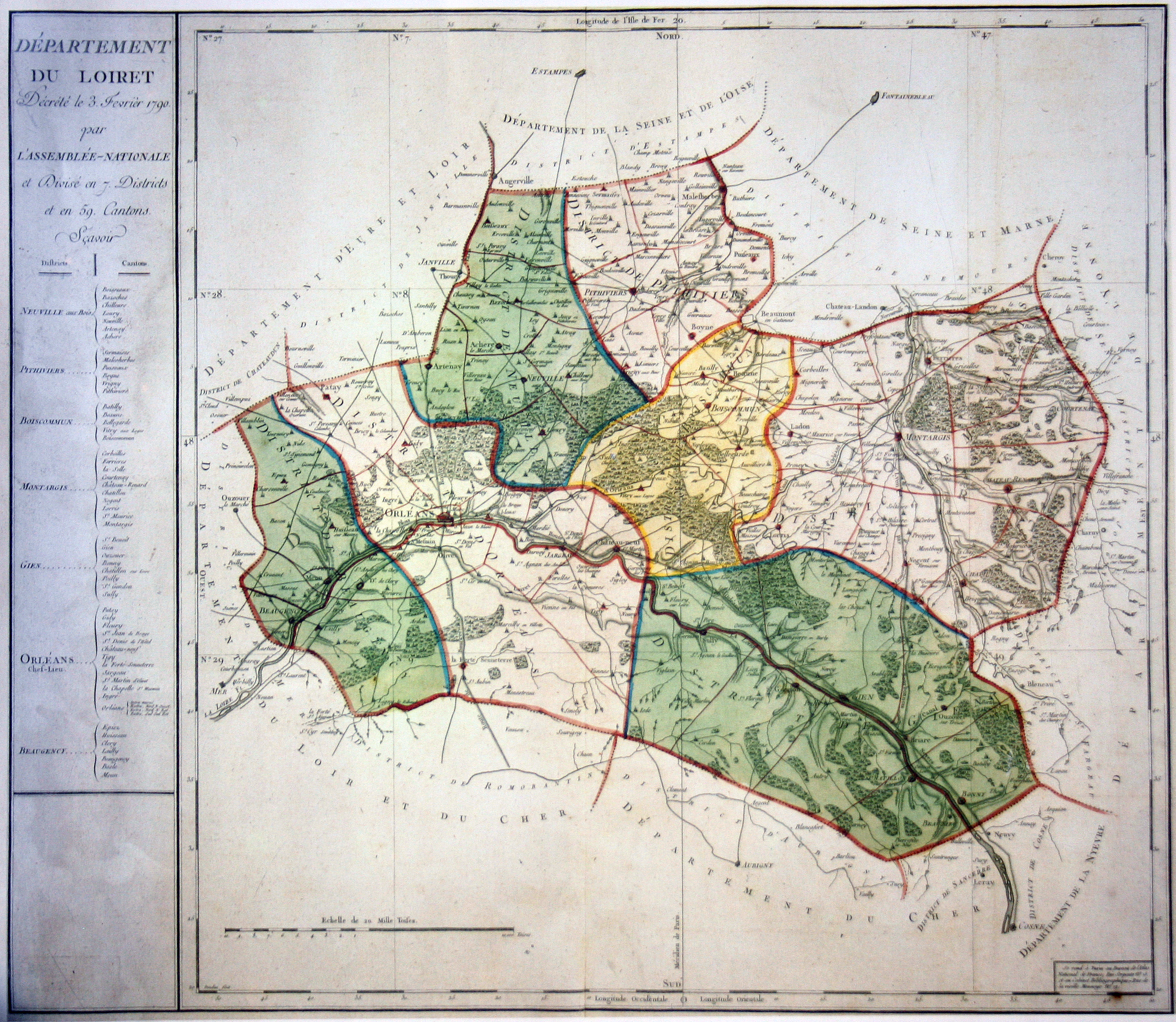
Map of the Loiret department (February 1790). At that time, the department consisted of seven districts (shown in color) and 59 cantons.

Although the term "department" was not a revolutionary creation, the National Constituent Assembly, by decree of December 22, 1789, planned a new division of the kingdom into seventy-five to eighty-five departments. The aim pursued by the deputies was to put an end to the complex network of various local constituencies, to eradicate privileges and franchises, and thus to establish an instrument of egalitarian uniformity.

A series of decrees of the National Assembly laid the foundations of the new administration in 1790. On January 15, 1790, the number of departments was set at 83, and most of the Généralité of Orléans gave birth to three of the new districts, provisionally called "Orléanois," "Blaisois," and "Pays Chartrain." During the month of January, the deputies of Orléanais and the neighboring departments established their boundaries after lengthy discussions. Their work resulted in the report of January 27, 1790, setting the limits of the "department of Orléans" and the number of districts at seven. At its session of February 3, 1790, the National Assembly adopted the conclusions of this report and of its Division Commission, and decreed that "the department of Orléanois, of which Orléans is the capital, is divided into seven districts (Orléans, Beaugency, Neuville, Pithiviers, Montargis, Gien, and Boiscommun) and 59 cantons." This decree was confirmed by that of February 26, where, for the first time, the department with Orléans as its capital was designated under the name "department of Loiret." The royal letters patent, signed by Louis XVI on March 4, 1790, made these various decisions enforceable.

Orléans thus went from being a provincial capital to being the capital of a department, in which the new "Departmental Council" sat, not without some opposition since Montargis had also claimed in December 1789 the status of departmental capital. The division of the department took no account of the former divisions: Beauce was split into three departments, Sologne was also divided between Cher, Loir-et-Cher, and Loiret.

The Constituent Assembly decided that the department would be administered by a "general council" composed of 36 members elected for two years and renewable by half every year. The election took place in two stages: in each cantonal capital, a primary assembly elected electors who in turn elected the general councillors. This system allowed large landowners and representatives of the upper bourgeoisie to be elected. The general council did not sit permanently. It designated, to represent it during the intervals between sessions, a departmental directorate composed of eight paid members who played the role of the department's executive. The directorate sat permanently and dealt with taxes, schools, prisons, agriculture, roads and bridges, and could issue decrees. The council elected each year a president and appointed a secretary general for the sessions of the general council and the permanent meetings of the directorate.

The general council was then essentially an administrative and not a representative body, unlike the former provincial estates, and the Constituent Assembly could dissolve it at any time. Similarly, the king could annul at any time the acts or deliberations he deemed contrary to the laws and orders received.

In Loiret, a report presented by the Attorney General Lemarcis to the general council on November 17, 1791, reviewed the operations carried out by the Departmental Directorate between December 1790 and October 1791. Among the issues he addressed, religious questions held an important place. Deprived of resources after the abolition of tithes (night of August 4, 1789) and the nationalization of its property (November 2, 1789), unsettled by revolutionaries who wanted it to fully adhere to the political and social principles that had emerged in 1789, the Church was in crisis. The transformation of clergymen into state officials through the Civil Constitution of the Clergy (July 12, 1790) and the obligation imposed on them to swear an oath (fidelity to the nation, the law, and the king, and upholding the Constitution) since the decree of December 26, 1790, had in particular sown unrest among the members of the former First Estate. The pope's condemnation of the Civil Constitution of the Clergy and of the oath (spring 1791) exacerbated tensions, despite attempts at appeasement (the decree of tolerance of May 7, 1791). The attorney was thus very satisfied to note that Loiret had shown, in this respect, its overall adherence to the new regime, and he particularly praised the adherence to the constitutional Church of the bishop of Orléans, Alexandre de Jarente de Sénas d'Orgeval. The Civil Constitution of the Clergy was condemned by Pope Pius VI and repealed by the Concordat of 1801.

=== Convention (1792–1795) ===
The insurrection of 10 August 1792 was a genuine popular movement with a national dimension, but it did not meet with much enthusiasm within the departmental assemblies. This led the Convention to decide, on 19 October 1792, on the renewal of the assemblies, which would henceforth be elected by direct universal suffrage. Every citizen aged twenty-five and residing for one year in the department was both an elector and eligible for election. The directory, instead of being designated by the general council, was itself elected by universal suffrage and by list voting, with up to two rounds. The main duties entrusted to the department were maintaining order, preserving property, guaranteeing individual safety, publishing laws, ensuring the free circulation of grain, collecting contributions, selling national property, and more.

In many departments, the assemblies sided with the Girondins against the Montagnards at the beginning of 1793. The Convention, dominated by the Montagnards, then decided to take several measures to stem the insurrection and passed an organic law on 14 Frimaire, Year II (4 December 1793), which abolished the general councils, the syndic general prosecutors, and the presidents. Only the directories were retained, but with prerogatives limited to public works, the distribution of taxes between districts, and the sale of communal property. However, the Convention kept the administrative division of the cantons, which retained an electoral role by a law of 26 June 1793. After the fall of Robespierre on 9 Thermidor, Year II (27 July 1794), the emergency measures of the Convention were annulled by the Constitution of 22 August 1795 (5 Fructidor, Year III), known as that of the "Bourgeois Republic." This Constitution abolished the districts, administrative bodies tied to the Terror, and reinforced the role of the cantons, which it had just reestablished.

=== Directory (1795–1799) ===
The Constitution of 5 Fructidor, Year III, applied from Vendémiaire, Year IV (1795), abolished the districts but maintained the cantons, which from then on gained greater importance. The duties of departmental administration included tax collection, requisitions, maintaining public order and tranquility, dealing with draft-dodgers and émigrés, organizing public forces, public works, and more. Nevertheless, the ability recognized to them of issuing wishes meant to express the expectations of their constituents carried within it the role of opinion relay that successive regimes would attribute to provincial notables, even if the assembly and its president remained subordinate to the prefect.

== Institutional reforms ==
=== Consulate and First Empire (1799–1814) ===
After Bonaparte's seizure of power, the country's administration was modified toward centralization with the law of 28 Pluviôse, Year VIII (17 February 1800), which divided "the European territory of the Republic into departments and municipal districts" (Art. 1). The departmental administration was completely changed. Bonaparte entrusted administrative authority to a single man, the prefect, appointed by the central government. The prefect was, however, assisted by two councils with limited and specialized powers: the general council and the prefectural council. The prefectural council was above all a tribunal responsible for administrative disputes, its members appointed and dismissed by the head of state. With this reorganization, the number of cantons was greatly reduced. By the decree of 9 Vendémiaire, Year X (1 October 1801), reducing the number of justices of the peace (cantons) in the department of Loiret, applied in accordance with this law, the number of cantons fell from 59 to 31.

According to the imperial decree of 21 August 1806, entitled "Decree containing the rectification of several cantons forming the justices of the peace of the department of Loiret," several cantons of Loiret underwent boundary changes; one canton was created (Artenay), three cantons were abolished (Olivet, Ingré, and Chécy), and the city of Orléans was redistricted (two additional cantons).

=== Constitutional monarchy (1814–1848): toward local democracy ===
The Restoration was accompanied by a strengthening of the General Councils, through reinforced stability of the departmental political personnel and the emergence of reformist ideas. Designated under Article 14 of the Charter of 4 June 1814 by royal appointment, the councillors and their president enjoyed great security, as large landed fortunes were relatively few in each department. The lack of renewal in their recruitment, the absence of a competence requirement, and the lack of electoral legitimacy fueled criticism of their mode of appointment.

The law of 22 June 1833 marked a real step toward local democracy, since members of the general councils were henceforth elected, though still by censitary suffrage. This law organized the representation of the department on the territorial basis of one general councillor elected in each canton, with a maximum limit of thirty per department. In Loiret, since there were 31 cantons, the forced grouping of two cantons to elect a single councillor sparked disputes. In addition to this relative opening toward the middle classes, the law marked a stage in consolidating the system of notables, without calling into question the centralization inherited from Napoleonic administration. The general councillors benefited from stability through a nine-year term. Their presidents could also hope to enjoy stable power, since the triennial renewal, by thirds, of the assembly, combined with censitary suffrage, was expected to protect them from electoral upheavals. From the session of 1834 onward, prefects were required to report on developments within the now-elected deliberative body to inform the central administration, which was uneasy about these changes. Loiret belonged to the mostly rural group of departments where the prefect lamented the "predominance of local spirit," exacerbated by voting at the cantonal capital.

The law of 10 May 1838 went further by allowing the president of the general council to transmit directly to the minister responsible for local authorities the "wishes" of the general council "in the interest of the department." For example, during the 1845 session, the president of the General Council of Loiret presented a request for reform of the mortgage system, the most commonly used form of credit in favor of owner-operators; he also transmitted to the government the wish for the establishment of agricultural banks under the patronage and control of the public authority, inspired by the practice of the German states to develop land credit. This wish was common to most general councils of wealthy, large-scale farming departments in the Paris Basin, whereas the poorer departments (Corsica, Corrèze, Indre) called for agricultural banks entirely established by the state.

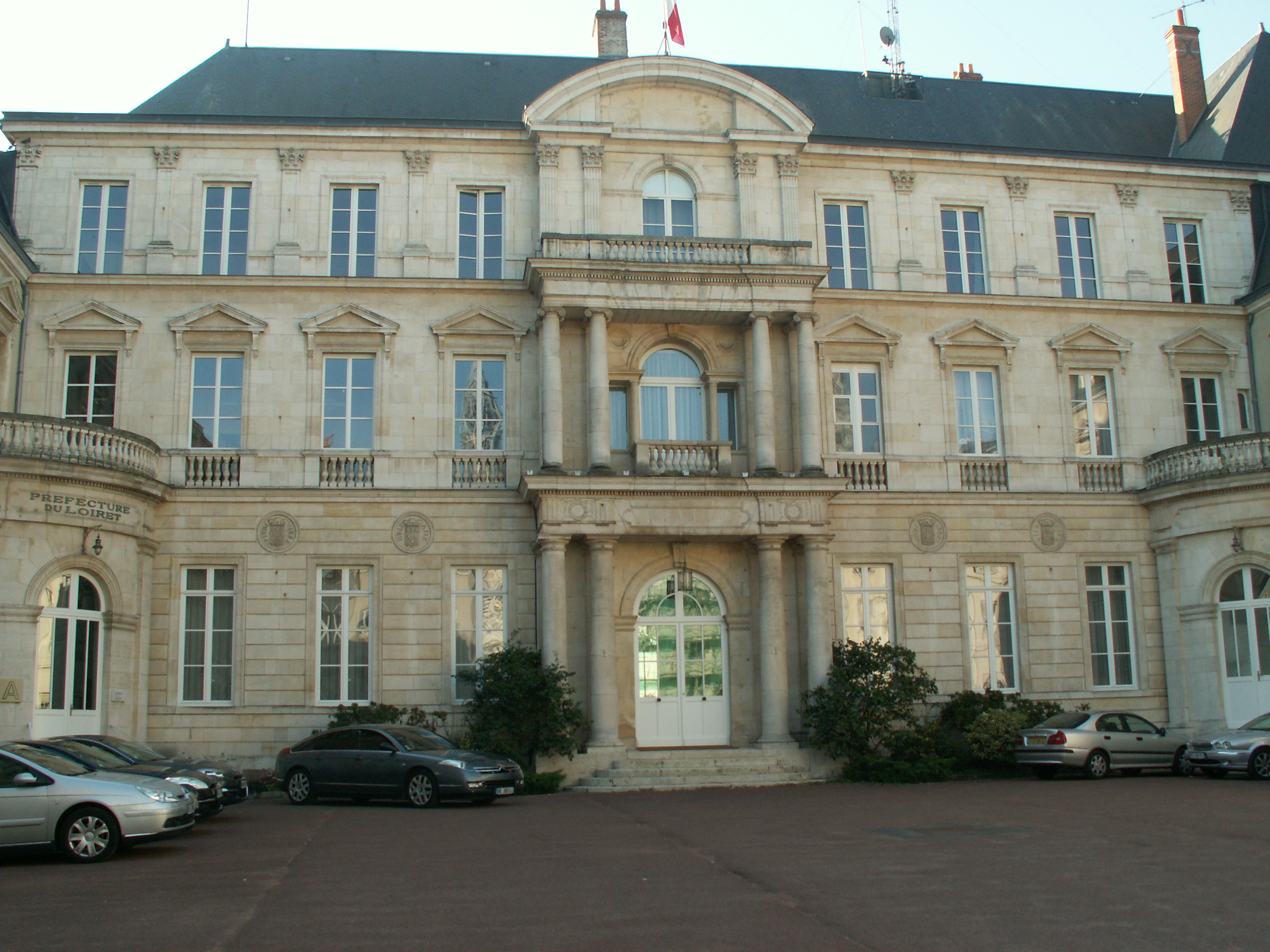
From 1790 to 1984, the Loiret General Council met at the Orléans Prefecture.

List of Presidents of the General Council of Loiret from 1814 to 1848
22 April 1817	Guy Émeric Anne de Durfort, Duke of Civrac then Duke of Lorges
3 August 1826	Alexandre François Marie Dugaigneau de Champvallins
16 August 1827	Guy Émeric Anne de Durfort, Duke of Civrac then Duke of Lorges
8 September 1828	Alexandre François Marie Dugaigneau de Champvallins
27 August 1829	Guy Émeric Anne de Durfort, Duke of Civrac then Duke of Lorges
10 May 1831	Louis, Baron Costaz
1 June 1832	Armand François Guyon de Guercheville
1 October 1833	Alexandre Perier
26 August 1839	Aimé Pierre Honoré Sevin-Mareau
23 August 1841	Alexandre Perier
26 August 1844	Aimé Pierre Honoré Sevin-Mareau
	Alexandre Martin
21 October 1848	Germain Nicolas Légier

=== Second Republic (1848–1852) ===
A further step toward local democracy was taken with the decree of 3 July 1848, which established a provisional system, pending the organic laws that a commission of thirty members was tasked to prepare, and which instituted universal male suffrage for cantonal elections. This measure was all the more revolutionary in that it was accompanied by the abolition of the cap of thirty general councillors per department. Henceforth, under Article 1, one general councillor would be elected in each canton. The same democratic concern led Article 18 to make the sessions of the General Council public, unless a majority of members requested a closed committee. However, the recourse to universal suffrage had the paradoxical consequence of drowning the councillors representing urban cantons within a General Council where every rural canton was now represented: the notability was further reinforced, since the politicization of debates had been mainly fueled by the urban representatives. The Second Republic, however, disappeared before completing the vote on the promised organic laws.

=== Second Empire (1852–1870) ===
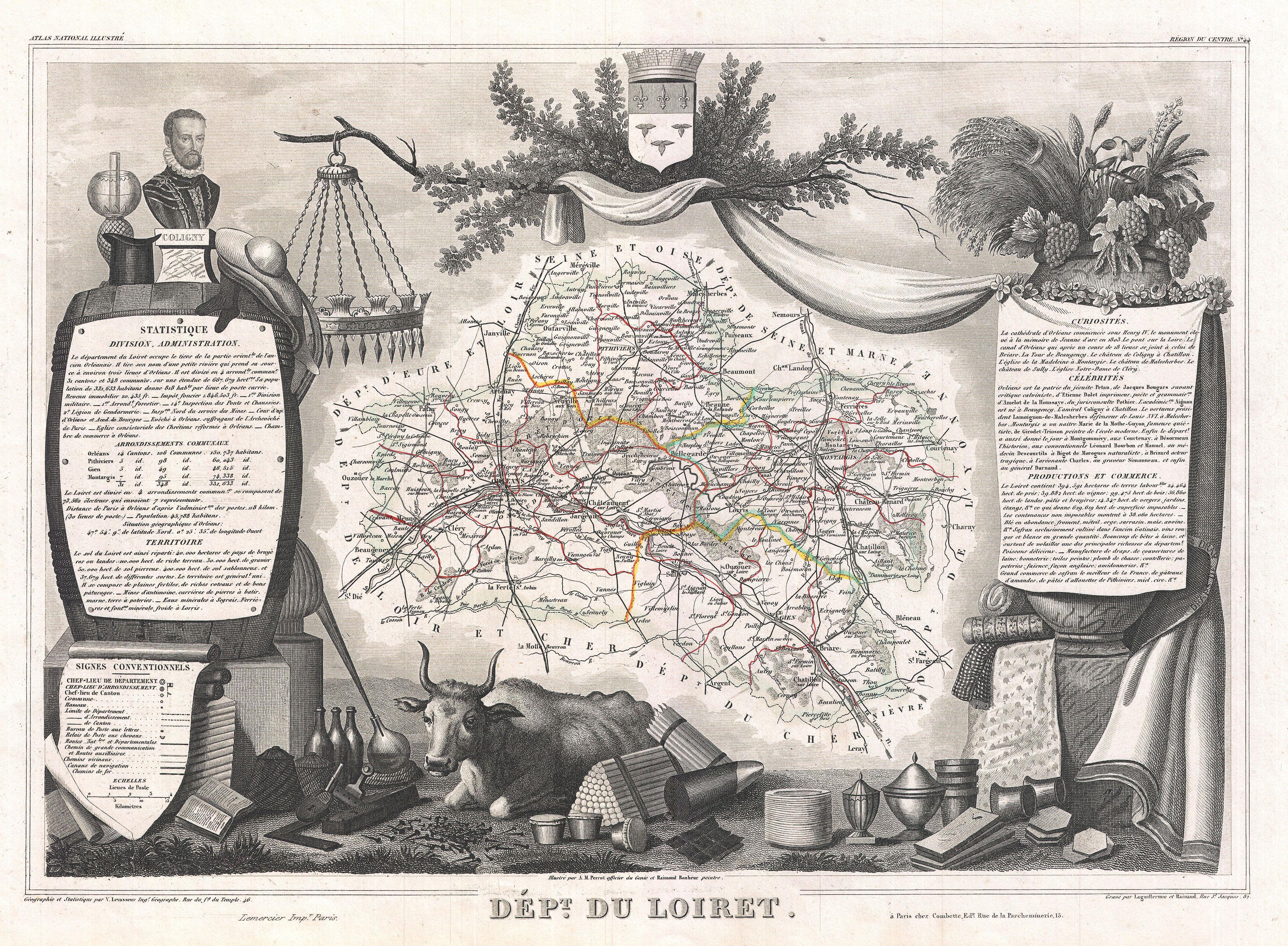
Levasseur map of the Loiret department (1852).

Following the coup d'état of 2 December 1851, the law of 7 July 1852 granted the President of the Republic the power to appoint the president of the General Council and the other bureau members. In contrast with the liberal measures of 1848, this law also ended the public nature of the General Council's sessions, before the ministerial circular of August 1852 further limited their reporting to the mere publication of the minutes that its president agreed to release. From 1852 to 1870, the president of the General Council was not elected by his peers but appointed: his selection nevertheless stemmed from an eminently political decision of the central authority, applied locally by the Prefectural Administration. This major ideological contradiction between the discourse and practice of the Second Empire was evident in the speech of the president of the General Council of Loiret, the Minister of Justice Jacques Pierre Abbatucci, who, on 23 August 1852, referred to the democratic anointment of elected officials after the concern for order, but gave no justification for the return to appointment of the president of these general councillors elected by universal suffrage.

The prefect attended the sessions of the general council. As representative of the central authority for the execution of laws, he supervised the deliberations and prevented them from exceeding the scope of the general council's responsibilities. As administrator of the department, he provided the general councillors with all necessary clarifications on matters submitted for their deliberation. He made proposals and supported or explained them. As representative of the department as a legal entity, he was also required to present to the general council his administrative account.

Under the pressure of the movement in favor of strengthening the autonomy of local authorities, decentralization themes entered the heart of the political debate under the Liberal Empire. In addition to the proposal of a regional framework and the promotion of cantonal cooperation among small municipalities, the main demand was for a clarification of roles between departmental bodies. It would no longer be the prefect but a permanent commission that would carry out the decisions of the General Council. The prefect would simply ensure the legality control of the General Council's acts, through his referral. The law of July 18, 1866, offered a partial response to these decentralizing aspirations by broadening the scope of powers of the general councils and authorizing them to vote extraordinary centimes, to be allocated to extraordinary expenditures of departmental utility. Moreover, definitive deliberations henceforth became enforceable within two months after the close of the session, unless annulled by the prefect for abuse of power or violation of the law. But criticism persisted over the absence of real means of controlling the actions of the prefect, and this prompted the President of the Council, Émile Ollivier, to convene in February 1870 an extra-parliamentary decentralization commission tasked with drafting legislative proposals to reform local authorities.

Date of Appointment	President of the General Council
15 August 1852	Jacques Pierre Abbatucci
2 August 1858	Charles Joseph de Salles
6 August 1859	Louis Marie Alexandre Mac Donald, Duke of Tarente
15 August 1868	Henry Jahan

== Third Republic: new powers, under prefect control (1871–1940) ==
=== Law of August 10, 1871: the charter of the departments ===
The law of July 23–26, 1870, corrected the law of 1866 on its most controversial points: the general council regained the right to elect its bureau, that is to say, its secretary, its vice-presidents, and its president. It could decide the order of its deliberations and draft its internal regulations. Finally, the drafting and publication of its minutes were determined by the Council, and the summary daily record of sessions was written under the supervision of the president of the General Council. Despite their importance, these measures went unnoticed in the atmosphere of mobilization and then debacle, all the more so as the Government of National Defense decreed, on December 25, 1870, the dissolution of the general councils, replaced by appointed departmental commissions. But some provisions of this law, as well as the ideas issued by the decentralization commission of 1870, were largely incorporated into the law of August 10, 1871.

The law of August 10, 1871, on general councils modernized the departmental institution by giving it the institutional framework and prerogatives that would ultimately prevail for more than a century, until the decentralization laws. The law distinguished between matters on which the departmental assembly "decides" and those on which it gives an "opinion." It also created the "departmental commission," composed of four to seven members, responsible for handling matters delegated to it by the general council but also for exercising a certain number of prerogatives of its own recognized by law. But the prefect remained the one who prepared and executed the decisions of the general council. The president of the general council exercised largely honorary functions. Moreover, the department remained subject to the financial, administrative, and technical supervision of the State.

The new general council of Loiret met on Monday, October 23, 1871, in its ordinary meeting room, at the Hôtel de la Préfecture in Orléans, by virtue of the decree of the President of the Republic of September 16, 1871, setting October 23 as the opening of the ordinary session of the general councils. Mr. Anceau presided over the session of October 23 as the eldest member. In his opening speech, the prefect emphasized the stakes of the new law and the responsibilities now granted to the general councils: "After two years of interruption, you will resume your work with expanded powers and responsibility. From this day forward, you are invested, in purely departmental matters, with an absolute right of decision. Through the advisory right you are called upon to exercise, you can intervene in all the administrative and economic affairs of the country. By forbidding political resolutions, the law of August 10, 1871, has raised you above the spirit of party and faction. Your deliberations will only have greater weight and gravity in the numerous and important matters that belong to you." But the essential part of the prefect's speech focused on the mobilization of Loiret during the 1870 war, the damage and trauma suffered by the territory and its population, the extent of the tasks already accomplished during the eight months following the armistice, and what remained to be achieved.

The election of the first president following the publication of the law of 1871 took place on the second day of the session, October 24, 1871: Mr. Louis Jahan was elected President of the general council for the year 1871–1872, with 17 votes against 13 for Mr. Cochery.

=== Presidency under the Third Republic ===
The successive presidents under the Third Republic proved particularly representative, through the specificity of their personality and their social and political background, of the transformations experienced by the country after the Franco-Prussian War. If Louis Jahan, a Councillor of State, embodied the great Bonapartist notable, who owed his nomination and then his election by the general councillors to his loyalty to Napoleon III, the lawyer and press owner Adolphe Cochery, a "Republican of the last hour" but quickly won over to the "conjunction of the centers," ensured the transition to the Opportunist Republic. His son, Georges Cochery, initiated a dynastic transmission of the presidency, extending from the crisis of May 16, 1877, to the "Sacred Union" of the summer of 1914. Beginning with Albert Viger, so representative of those physicians esteemed by rural populations and of those general councillors expert in agricultural matters, the domination of radical elected officials over the general council of Loiret continued in the interwar period with Fernand Rabier, the embodiment of anticlericalism, then with the Inspector General Louis Gallouédec and the agronomist engineer Marcel Donon.

The characteristics of the mandates of the seven presidents elected under the Third Republic were as follows.

Presidents	Year of Birth	Year of Death	Year of Election to the General Council	Age at Entry to the General Council	Total Duration of Terms as General Councilor (in years)	Year of Election to the Presidency of the General Council	Age at Entry to the Presidency of the General Council
Louis Jahan	1811	1894	1855	44	22	1870	59
Adolphe Cochery	1819	1900	1871	52	29	1877	58
Georges Cochery	1855	1914	1883	28	31	1900	45
Marie Albert Viger	1843	1926	1886	43	39	1906	63
Fernand Rabier	1855	1933	1907	52	26	1925	70
Louis Gallouédec	1864	1937	1907	43	30	1933	69
Marcel Donon	1879	1943	1919	40	21	1934	55

Chronology of prefects and presidents of the general council from 1900 to 1939
Year	Prefect	President of the General Council	
1900	Third Republic		Georges Cochery
1901	Third Republic		Georges Cochery
1902	Third Republic	Gustave Marie Antoine Chadenier	Georges Cochery
1903	Third Republic	Gustave Marie Antoine Chadenier	Georges Cochery
1904	Third Republic	Gustave Marie Antoine Chadenier	Georges Cochery
1905	Third Republic	Jean Jacques Georges Maringer Félix Trepont	Georges Cochery
1906	Third Republic	Jean Jacques Georges Maringer Félix Trepont	Georges Cochery
1907	Third Republic	Georges Émile Tallon	Georges Cochery
1908	Third Republic	Georges Émile Tallon	Georges Cochery
1909	Third Republic	Robert Godefroy	Georges Cochery
1910	Third Republic	Robert Godefroy	Georges Cochery
1911	Third Republic	Charles Aubert Gaston Poux-Laville	Georges Cochery
1912	Third Republic	Charles Aubert Gaston Poux-Laville	Marie Albert Viger
1913	Third Republic	Charles Aubert Gaston Poux-Laville	Georges Cochery
1914	Third Republic	Gabriel Brin Urbain Vitry	Marie Albert Viger
1915	Third Republic	Gabriel Brin Urbain Vitry	Marie Albert Viger
1916	Third Republic	Gabriel Brin Urbain Vitry	Marie Albert Viger
1917	Third Republic	Gabriel Brin Urbain Vitry	Marie Albert Viger
1918	Third Republic	Gabriel Brin Urbain Vitry	Marie Albert Viger
1919	Third Republic	Gaston Allain	Marie Albert Viger
1920	Third Republic	Pierre Génébrier	Marie Albert Viger
1921	Third Republic	Pierre Génébrier	Marie Albert Viger
1922	Third Republic	Pierre Génébrier	Marie Albert Viger
1923	Third Republic	Pierre Génébrier	Marie Albert Viger
1924	Third Republic	Pierre Génébrier	Marie Albert Viger
1925	Third Republic	Pierre Génébrier	Fernand Rabier
1926	Third Republic	Pierre Génébrier	Fernand Rabier
1927	Third Republic	Pierre Génébrier	Fernand Rabier
1928	Third Republic	Pierre Génébrier	Fernand Rabier
1929	Third Republic	Pierre Chaumet Paul Castanet	Fernand Rabier
1930	Third Republic	André Jozon	Fernand Rabier
1931	Third Republic	André Jozon	Fernand Rabier
1932	Third Republic	André Jozon	Fernand Rabier
1933	Third Republic	Robert Billecart	Louis Gallouédec
1934	Third Republic	Robert Billecart	Marcel Donon
1935	Third Republic	Robert Billecart	Louis Gallouédec
1936	Third Republic	Jules Scamaroni	Marcel Donon
1937	Third Republic	Jules Scamaroni	Marcel Donon
1938	Third Republic	Marcel Antoine Jean Lemoine	Marcel Donon
1939	Third Republic	Marcel Antoine Jean Lemoine	Marcel Donon

=== Departmental activity ===
==== Communication routes ====
The management, maintenance, and creation of new communication routes (departmental roads, local major roads, local-interest railways, ferries and crossings, etc.) were areas of competence clearly identified by law. For communication routes of departmental interest not explicitly defined as falling within its competence, the assembly issued resolutions. Thus, in the railway sector, the general council was concerned with good rail service for communes remote from the capital, but also with the reestablishment of interdepartmental links. On September 28, 1908, Gallouédec expressed the wish that two trains per day, on the Pithiviers–Orléans line, stop at Marigny-les-Usages. He also submitted a motion recommending that the Orléans–Vierzon train stop near the Pont Bourgogne, in anticipation of the construction of the canal bridge at Orléans. In 1913, together with Fernand Rabier, Louis Gallouédec signed a motion supporting the evening train from Orléans to Montargis stopping at Semoy. In 1918, he also submitted a motion on the restoration of five daily trains between Orléans and Gien, noting that the single train preserved since January 1917 was overcrowded and forced passengers to stand. And in 1927, a resolution called for a daily express tram on the cross line Le Mans–Orléans–Gien to avoid a detour through Paris, which lengthened the route by more than 150 km from Nantes to Orléans and Briare.

At the session of August 26, 1918, Louis Gallouédec expressed the wish to complete the works on the Combleux–Orléans canal, as well as the request, supported by Rabier, for a thorough study of the feasibility of a navigable waterway project.

From 1933 onward, the financial difficulties of the departmental steam tramway company of Sologne, Val de Loire, and Beauce worried the general council. On May 3, 1934, the failure was acknowledged, opening the way to the termination of the public service concession contract: the constant worsening of the operating deficit, linked to the fall in passenger numbers and the deterioration of service, together with the absence of an amicable agreement with the company, led the general council to schedule the cessation of all payments as of the end of June 1934, and to demand moreover the reimbursement of sums paid in advance. In November 1935, the shutdown of these unprofitable lines was confirmed, despite protests from the rural populations served. This "trauma" of the tramway closures served as an argument during the November 4, 1935, debate on the Orléans canal to reject the outright downgrading recommended by the prefect, here acting as spokesman for the Ministry of Public Works. The decline of activity discouraged considering the costly option of enlarging it to a major gauge, but the general councillors fell back on the mediocre path of continuing operation with the existing capacity.

==== School affairs ====
Gallouédec frequently intervened on school matters, beginning in 1908 as rapporteur of the administrative commission on questions of education and assistance. He thus addressed concrete issues such as the furniture of the Écoles Normales, the travel expenses of teachers, but also adult courses and, more generally, the state of primary education in the Loiret, taking into account the decline in birth rates and the secularization of the last religious school. In 1911, he initiated the creation of a commission for the establishment of a winter agricultural school, annexed to the higher primary school of Orléans. The pedagogue did not disappear behind the departmental notable: Gallouédec initiated the creation of a local history competition, reserved for members of the teaching corps. The goal was to contribute to the improvement of historical documentation for teachers in libraries, and thus to stimulate the teaching of local history, as the prefect of Loiret, Scamaroni, recalled at the time of Gallouédec's passing.

==== Affair of drawing water from the Loire to supply Paris ====
Since its declaration as being of public utility on 21 February 1868, the project of drawing water from the Loire for the city of Paris worried the general councillors of the Loiret. Nearly one million cubic meters would be brought daily to the capital via a 173 km aqueduct and, to compensate for low-water periods at Orléans, a reservoir of 10 to 12 million cubic meters would be built in the Orléans forest, as well as retention dams on the upper course of the river, to offset withdrawals by equivalent releases. With the war of 1870–71, the project was set aside, then resurfaced in 1898, at which point the Loiret general council opposed it. Then, the war of 1914–18 again caused the project to be forgotten... until 1928, when Paris resumed it in a different form: the water would be captured in 1,250 wells dug into the alluvial aquifer of the Val, between Nevers and Gien, then conveyed to Paris by a 160 km collector aqueduct, with three retention dams to be built, including that of Villerest. On 26 October 1928, the departmental assembly issued a new protest against this project, and requested that a "commission of impartial scholars" give its opinion. Nearly a year later, on 25 September 1929, the matter seemed to be unblocked: the Minister of Public Works created the requested study commission, and the prefect of Loiret appointed President Rabier and Vice-President Gallouédec to sit on it. The calming of tensions made it possible to advance toward a compromise solution. However, the project failed once more, a victim of the economic crisis that dried up Parisian finances, though it remained classified as being of public utility. One had to wait until 1962 for the project finally to be abandoned, after opposition from the Loiret general council.

==== Political resolutions ====
Despite repeated oaths of political neutrality within the General Council, the motions of confidence addressed to the governments of the early twentieth century reflect the tempered radicalism of the Loiret, through the opinions of its grassroots elected officials. Thus, on 25 September 1911, Gallouédec obtained an almost unanimous vote of support for the government "to pursue the policy of secular defense and democratic and social progress," "to put an end to acts of sabotage, to repress all anti-patriotic propaganda." Similarly, in 1923, the general council expressed its support for the Poincaré government during the occupation of the Ruhr; this did not prevent it, the next year, from voting confidence in the Herriot government for its foreign policy, which directly contradicted that of "Poincaruhr."

Beyond foreign policy issues, the major themes of national debate were not absent from the sessions of the general council. Thus, on 22 September 1924, a debate opposed the left, which wanted "to uphold secular and republican institutions internally," and the right, more sensitive to clerical influences and more attentive not to offend the particularism of the concordat departments.

In 1926, the "battle of the franc," a new monetary and financial counter-offensive on the Marne, led the general council to approve Gallouédec's proposal: to make a voluntary departmental contribution of 50,000 francs to participate in this recovery.

Even the question of the voting system for general elections gave rise to debate in the General Council: on 2 May 1927, Théophile Chollet proposed the reinstatement of the two-round majority single-member district vote, and opposed Gaumet, who remained a supporter of proportional representation. At the same session, Gaumet proposed recognizing women's eligibility to vote and stand for all assemblies, but the radical majority overwhelmingly rejected this proposition.

At the session of 26 September 1932, Fernand Rabier invited the general councillors of the Loiret to express their support for the president of the Council: "Following the example of our colleagues from other departments, you will wish to convey to the Head of Government, M. Édouard Herriot, the gratitude of all Frenchmen for the calm and courageous energy he has demonstrated, our gratitude for having once again shown the world, with eloquent firmness, the true face of France, resolutely peaceful and generous."

== Parenthesis under the Vichy Regime (1940–1944) ==
Under the Vichy regime, the sessions of general councils and departmental commissions were suspended by the law of 12 October 1940. The powers formerly granted to them were exercised by the prefect, assisted by an administrative commission composed of seven to nine members appointed by decrees of the Minister-Secretary of State for the Interior.

Meanwhile, the law of 19 April 1941 established nineteen regional prefects, each assisted by an "intendant of economic affairs" and an "intendant of police." The decree of 30 June 1941 specified the respective attributions of the prefects of Loiret, Ille-et-Vilaine, Maine-et-Loire, and Vienne, who thus became prefects of the regions of Orléans, Rennes, Angers, and Poitiers. The Orléans region grouped Loiret, Eure-et-Loir, Loir-et-Cher, Indre (in its occupied part), and Cher (also in its occupied part). Indre-et-Loire was divided between the Angers region and that of Limoges. Jacques Morane, prefect in Orléans since June 1940, thus became regional prefect until October 1942. Jacques-Félix Bussière succeeded him in December 1942.

The law of 7 August 1942 established in each department a departmental council composed of the same number of members as the suspended general council, i.e. xx members in the Loiret. The departmental councillors were appointed by decree of the Minister-Secretary of State for the Interior. They were required to meet twice a year, in sessions not public and not to exceed 10 days. The first ordinary session was held at the prefecture hotel on (15 June) 1943. Dates of the other ordinary sessions: (18 October) 1943 and (5 June) 1944. Extraordinary session on (27 March) 1944.

At the Liberation, the regional prefects were transformed into "regional commissioners" by the ordinance of 10 January 1944 dividing the territory into regional commissariats of the Republic and creating general commissariats of the Republic, before being abolished in 1946. André Mars, a lawyer at the Paris Court of Appeal, fulfilled this function at the Liberation on 16 August 1944 and left it two months later upon the appointment of Marcel Lanquetin as Prefect, replaced a year later by François Lota in September 1945. These regional commissioners thus had a brief existence.

== Period 1945–1982: Reconstruction and modernization, still under the prefect's authority ==
=== Cantonal redistricting of 1973 ===
With the decree of 23 July 1973, nine new cantons were created, three disappeared, and two were renamed:

- The canton of Montargis was divided into three cantons: Amilly, Châlette-sur-Loing, and Montargis, which remained with the sole commune of Montargis;
- The canton of Orléans-North-Westwas divided into three cantons: Orléans-Bannier (or Orléans-III), Fleury-les-Aubrais, and Saint-Jean-de-la-Ruelle;
- The canton of Orléans-North-East was divided into two cantons: Orléans-Saint-Marc (or Orléans-IV) and Saint-Jean-de-Braye;
- The canton of Orléans-South was divided into two cantons: Orléans-Saint-Marceau – La Source (or Orléans-V) and Olivet;
- The canton of Orléans-East took the name Orléans-Bourgogne (or Orléans-I);
- The canton of Orléans-West took the name Orléans-Carmes (or Orléans-II).

In addition, the commune of Boulay-les-Barres, previously in the canton of Orléans-North-West, was attached to the canton of Patay. The number of cantons thus rose from 31 to 37.

=== Premises ===
Since 1930, the general council had been installed in a room of the prefectural hotel. In 1966, Pierre Pagot justified the need to improve this room by noting that it was cramped, uncomfortable, and dilapidated, offering only 31 seats, and that the last renovation of the prefecture dated back to 1805. The new Chamber of Deliberations of the General Council, now located in the renovated east wing of the prefecture, was inaugurated on 23 January 1968. A work of art, created by the wood sculptor Robert Rapp, depicting the effigy of the Republic in high relief from a single block of walnut more than two meters high, decorates this chamber. Aubusson tapestries designed by the draughtsman-tapestry maker Perrot on the theme of hunting adorn the committee rooms.

=== Presidency from 1945 to 1982 ===
On Monday, October 29, 1945, Pierre Dézarnaulds was elected president of the General Council by twenty votes in favor, 10 blank ballots, and one vote for Claude Lemaître, an industrialist and councilor from Châteauneuf-sur-Loire. On Tuesday, October 30, the second day of the session, he gave political meaning to his election: "You have, no doubt, wished to put into practice this indispensable need for unity anchored in the hearts of all true patriotic Frenchmen at the present time." But he emphasized above all the vast, almost "crushing" scope of the reconstruction work to be carried out in this department where "our road bridges and railway bridges are almost entirely destroyed," and in which "you will also have to bring aid and assistance to our devastated towns: Orléans, Gien, Sully-sur-Loire, Beaugency, Châteauneuf-sur-Loire." Finally, before paying tribute to the "uncontested leader of the definitive Government of the Republic," to whom he expressed "all his confidence to implement the program of the National Council of the Resistance and to defend the security and the age-old interests of France and its empire." (Note: Allorant 2003, p. 138)

From 1951 to 1955, President Dézarnaulds saw his mandate renewed each time unanimously, but in 1955 he suffered a severe setback in the senatorial elections. His advanced age, infirmities, and authoritarian habits were no longer tolerated, and some reproached him for having attempted to prolong his parliamentary career by seeking a seat in the Council of the Republic, instead of retiring from political life. On November 19, 1956, Pierre Dézarnaulds lost his presidency: he obtained only 13 votes out of 29 cast, against 15 for Dr. Maurice Charpentier and one vote for Maître Perroy. This change was clearly the result of personal disavowal, as confirmed by the easy reelection of vice-presidents Grosbois and Perdereau. The speech of the new president did not contain a single word about Dézarnaulds' eleven years of presidency, and it took the intervention of councilor Maurice Grandidier of Châteaurenard for a tribute to be rendered, naming him, by acclamation, Honorary President of the General Council. The Prefect complemented this "acknowledgment of debt" by thanking him on behalf of the Prefectoral Administration. (Note: Allorant 2003, p. 140)

It was under Dr. Charpentier's initiative that the General Council created, in 1957, the SEMPEL, of which he became president. This mixed-economy company facilitated the reception of the benefits of expansion, particularly the decentralization of industrial and service facilities from the Paris region. This structure made Loiret a pioneering department in supporting economic development. (Note: Allorant 2003, p. 172) He resigned for health reasons in 1958. (Note: Allorant 2003, p. 173)

Pierre Perroy, an Orléans lawyer, holder of a law degree and an HEC diploma, succeeded Dr. Maurice Charpentier on April 30, 1958. Well established in the city's industrial and professional circles, appreciated for his oratorical skills and warm personality, he embodied the provincial liberal notable, echoing in Orléans the themes of the popular Antoine Pinay. But his past as a member of the Patriotic Youth, his pro–French Algeria positions, and above all his departure from the MRP alienated him from much support, and he lost the presidency in 1961.

Claude Lemaître was elected president from June 17, 1961, to March 18, 1964. His presidency was marked by his direct conflict with Prefect Dupuch, former chief of staff to the regional prefect of Clermont-Ferrand under Vichy, at the age of 31. During the commemoration of the sacrifice of the Resistance fighters of the Orléans Forest at the By crossroads, an incident broke out: Claude Lemaître declared to the prefect that his behavior during the Occupation forbade him any right to preside over such a tribute to the memory of the Resistance. There was tension duting the sessions of the General Council, until the prefect deployed his strategy of revenge, erasing the humiliation suffered by ensuring Lemaître's non-renewal as president in 1964. Dupuch encouraged the candidacy of the moderate and victorious MRP member Pierre Pagot, who obtained sixteen votes against fourteen for Claude Lemaître. (Note: Allorant 2003, p. 174)

Pierre Pagot became president of the General Council at age 62, on March 18, 1964, having already sat there for nine years. At his reelection in 1967, he won by only one vote, again against Claude Lemaître. On March 18, 1970, he broadened his margin, securing a majority of 18 votes against 12 for Dr. Grosbois. His designation for a fourth term was even clearer, with 27 votes against 10 for Marcel Legras, Dézarnaulds' successor at Châtillon-sur-Loire. (Note: Allorant 2003, p. 175)

Elected senator of Loiret on September 22, 1974, Kléber Malécot was logically elected president of the General Council on March 28, 1979. A proponent of a managerial approach, advocating nonpartisanship despite belonging to the UDF and supporting President Giscard d'Estaing, Kléber Malécot secured the near-unanimous adoption of departmental budgets and cultivated friendly relations with opposition left-wing representatives. He held the presidency for 15 years, until 1994.

Thus, six presidencies held the position of president of the General Council between 1945 and 1982.

Presidents	Year of Birth	Year of Death	Year of Election to the General Council	Age at Entry to the General Council	Total Duration of Terms as General Councilor (in years)	Year of Election to the Presidency of the General Council	Age at Entry to the Presidency of the General Council
Pierre Dézarnaulds	1879	1975	1919	40	44	1945	66
Maurice Charpentier	1908	1965	1951	43	14	1956	48
Pierre Perroy	1907	1990	1949	42	12	1958	51
Claude Lemaitre-Basset	1900	1983	1945	45	28	1961	61
Pierre Pagot	1902	1988	1955	35	24	1964	62
Kléber Malécot	1915	2008	1958	43	36	1979	64

Chronology of prefects and presidents of the general council from 1945 to 1982
	1945	François Lota	Pierre Dézarnaulds
1946	Fourth Republic	François Lota	Pierre Dézarnaulds
1947	Fourth Republic	François Lota	Pierre Dézarnaulds
1948	Fourth Republic	André Trémaux	Pierre Dézarnaulds
1949	Fourth Republic	André Trémaux	Pierre Dézarnaulds
1950	Fourth Republic	André Trémaux	Pierre Dézarnaulds
1951	Fourth Republic	André Trémaux	Pierre Dézarnaulds
1952	Fourth Republic	Maxime Roux	Pierre Dézarnaulds
1953	Fourth Republic	Maxime Roux	Pierre Dézarnaulds
1954	Fourth Republic	Maxime Roux	Pierre Dézarnaulds
1955	Fourth Republic	Désiré Arnaud Robert Holveck	Pierre Dézarnaulds
1956	Fourth Republic	Désiré Arnaud Robert Holveck	Maurice Charpentier
1957	Fourth Republic	Désiré Arnaud Robert Holveck	Maurice Charpentier
1958	Fifth Republic	Désiré Arnaud Robert Holveck	Pierre Perroy
1959	Fifth Republic	Pierre Dupuch	Pierre Perroy
1960	Fifth Republic	Pierre Dupuch	Pierre Perroy
1961	Fifth Republic	Pierre Dupuch	Claude Lemaitre-Basset
1962	Fifth Republic	Pierre Dupuch	Claude Lemaitre-Basset
1963	Fifth Republic	Pierre Dupuch	Claude Lemaitre-Basset
1964	Fifth Republic	Pierre Dupuch	Pierre Pagot
1965	Fifth Republic	Pierre Dupuch	Pierre Pagot
1966	Fifth Republic	Pierre Dupuch	Pierre Pagot
1967	Fifth Republic	Jacques Juillet	Pierre Pagot
1968	Fifth Republic	Jacques Juillet	Pierre Pagot
1969	Fifth Republic	Francis Graeve	Pierre Pagot
1970	Fifth Republic	Francis Graeve	Pierre Pagot
1971	Fifth Republic	Francis Graeve	Pierre Pagot
1972	Fifth Republic	Francis Graeve	Pierre Pagot
1973	Fifth Republic	Paul Masson	Pierre Pagot
1974	Fifth Republic	Paul Masson	Pierre Pagot
1975	Fifth Republic	Paul Masson	Pierre Pagot
1976	Fifth Republic	Bernard Couzier	Pierre Pagot
1977	Fifth Republic	Bernard Couzier	Pierre Pagot
1978	Fifth Republic	Marcel Blanc	Pierre Pagot
1979	Fifth Republic	Marcel Blanc	Kléber Malécot
1980	Fifth Republic	Jean Rochet	Kléber Malécot
1981	Fifth Republic	Jean Rochet	Kléber Malécot
1982	Fifth Republic	Jean Rochet	Kléber Malécot
1983	Fifth Republic	Jean Terrade	Kléber Malécot
1984	Fifth Republic	Jean Terrade	Kléber Malécot
1985	Fifth Republic	Yves-Jean Bentegeac	Kléber Malécot
1986	Fifth Republic	Paul Bernard	Kléber Malécot
1987	Fifth Republic	Paul Bernard	Kléber Malécot
1988	Fifth Republic	Paul Bernard	Kléber Malécot
1989	Fifth Republic	Paul Bernard	Kléber Malécot
1990	Fifth Republic	Paul Bernard	Kléber Malécot
1991	Fifth Republic	Hubert Blanc	Kléber Malécot
1992	Fifth Republic	Hubert Blanc	Kléber Malécot
1993	Fifth Republic	Bernard Gérard	Kléber Malécot
1994	Fifth Republic	Bernard Gérard	Éric Doligé
1995	Fifth Republic	Bernard Gérard	Éric Doligé
1996	Fifth Republic	Bernard Gérard	Éric Doligé
1997	Fifth Republic	Jacques Barel	Éric Doligé
1998	Fifth Republic	Jacques Barel	Éric Doligé
1999	Fifth Republic	Patrice Magnier	Éric Doligé
2000	Fifth Republic	Patrice Magnier	Éric Doligé

=== Departmental activity ===
==== Reconstruction ====
A considerable task arose immediately after the Liberation: rebuilding houses, schools, bridges, and roads, bringing Loiret out of its ruins. The General Council was one of the main actors of this reconstruction through the wishes and aid budgets it voted. In May 1953, the General Council deplored that the number of unsatisfied housing requests had reached 4,500 in the department. Alongside this housing effort, the General Council decided to help municipalities make subdivisions viable in order to encourage construction. The measure proved effective and lasted until November 1980.

As for roads, the task was equally immense, both for departmental roads and those under the State's authority. In May 1953, the general councilors vehemently protested against the Ministry of Public Works, which refused to rebuild the Maréchal-Joffre Bridge on the pretext that another bridge was planned further west. This was to be a bridge located at the level of Place Paul-Bert in Saint-Jean-de-la-Ruelle, where the western bypass of the Orléans urban area already connected. After negotiations between the State, the department, the Chamber of Commerce and Industry, and the city of Orléans for the possible reconstruction of this structure with financial assistance from the General Council, the Ministry of Public Works, Transport, and Tourism announced on November 24, 1954, that the reconstruction of the Joffre Bridge had been decided. (Note: Blanquet 1994, p. 206)

==== Roads ====
Once reconstruction was completed, a new development, a prelude to the decentralization to come, redefined the composition of the departmental road network. In 1972, the Finance Law of December 29, 1971, provided for the nationwide transfer of nearly 53,000 kilometers of national roads into departmental road systems. The aim was to allow the State to concentrate its efforts on the main national routes, to increase the responsibilities of departmental assemblies in line with the decentralization desired by the government, and to ensure better management and programming of the entire network. For the department of Loiret, 531 km of national roads became departmental by interministerial decree of December 31, 1972.

Various engineering structures on the Loire showed signs of fatigue. On March 26, 1964, traffic was banned on the Jargeau Bridge, and on April 12 of the same year, bicycles and pedestrians were also banned. A Bailey bridge with a single lane for vehicles was installed. A new bridge was not opened until 1988. (Note: Blanquet 1994, p. 212) Likewise, following the collapse of the Wilson Bridge in Tours in 1978, a major inspection of the Loire bridges was launched, leading to the closure of the medieval Beaugency Bridge to traffic in July 1979 and repair work in 1980. (Note: Blanquet 1994, p. 213) The department also supported major municipal projects. Thus, the third bridge in Orléans, east of the city near the railway bridge, was financed to the extent of 20% by the department and inaugurated on February 16, 1977. (Note: Blanquet 1994, p. 207)

==== Development of the Loire ====
The defense of the development of the Loire was the main priority of president Pierre Pagot, which he carried out in concert with the regional prefect Paul Masson, by assuming the presidency of the Interdepartmental Institution for the Protection of the Loire Valleys, founded in 1975, which built the Villerest dam from 1978 to 1984. In November 1967, the Council deliberated on the reinforcement of the levees, a study entrusted to a group of Dutch engineers from Delft, specialized in soil mechanics. Reinforcement by embankments situated behind the dikes was recommended. On January 1, 1979, the 35 km of levees in the Val d'Orléans were reinforced at a cost of 16 million francs. (Note: Blanquet 1994, p. 134) The Council then continued its participation in the reinforcement of the levees as part of the successive State-region planning contracts up until 2015.

==== Agriculture and rural life ====
In 1959, the Intermunicipal Syndicate for the Development of the Communes of Loiret (SIPECOL) was created to develop housing areas and industrial zones, chaired by the general councillor of Briare, Pierre-Armand Thiébaut, and later succeeded by Kléber Malécot. At the end of 1972, a proposal was submitted by Hubert Frémy, general councillor of Chatillon-Coligny, and approved by the assembly, aiming to establish a Departmental Committee for Rural Development to identify needs, set objectives, and launch coordinated actions regarding the rural world. Hubert Frémy emphasized the changing structure of farms and the aging of their workforce. According to 1971 statistics, 45% of farmers were 55 years and older, and only 8% were under 35. This created a renewal problem. This aging did not prevent cereal cultivation from growing from 230,000 to 275,000 hectares, while production reached 12 million quintals, 50% more than in 1965. Sugar beet production also increased, as did fruit production, which made a major leap from 10,000 to 45,000 tons. However, Frémy also noted a decline in livestock farming: 120,000 cattle in 1971 compared to 160,000 in 1965, a reduction that affected the tonnage of slaughtered meat, which was 17,000 tons in 1971 compared to 24,000 tons five years earlier. To support the rural world, the departmental assembly created in 1974 a Departmental Fund to accompany regional actions, as the Regional Council had just been established, with a budget of 10 million francs allocated to it. This support came in addition to existing aid: livestock buildings, fuel tax rebates, SAFER interventions, lifelong departure allowances, land consolidation aid and related works, land drainage, irrigation, and road infrastructure. The general council continued to support the rural world without being able to stop a decline that affected not only Loiret.

==== Economy and employment ====
As early as 1954, to encourage business transfers and consolidations, the general council sought to make use of the law of February 17, 1953, to reduce by 50% for five years the business tax of new enterprises. It requested a study on the matter, since no company had yet benefited from this law in the department, which was then characterized by localized large industries: Hutchinson with 4,800 workers in Châlette-sur-Loing, the Faïencerie of Gien with 250 employees, Brandt in La Ferté-Saint-Aubin, Tréca in Beaugency, and Maure-Thermor (2,000 employees) in Orléans. The departmental assembly decided to establish a departmental committee to encourage new business establishments. (Note: Blanquet 1994, pp. 181–182) On May 30, 1960, a Departmental Industrialization Plan, developed with the support of the Chamber of Commerce and Industry and the newly formed Expansion Committee, set the goal of creating an additional ten thousand jobs within five years. At the same time, SEMPEL was created in 1957 under the initiative of the General Council, with Étienne Barazer de Lannurien as its director and Claude Lemaître as president. Loiret was the first department in France to establish such a structure. In June 1960, the John Deere factory was established in Saran. Others followed. During the second 1960 session of the General Council, the Prefect welcomed full employment, while Pierre Perroy emphasized signs of expansion, which justified resorting to loans to encourage this development. But the situation deteriorated after the first oil crisis of 1974, and the number of job seekers increased by 19% in one year in 1979, and nearly 30% in the Gien area. At the opening of the second 1981 session, president Kléber Malécot noted the continued deterioration of the employment situation in Loiret. He called for greater decentralization so that local authorities, especially Departments, could play an active role in supporting their economic fabric. (Note: Blanquet 1994, pp. 183–187)

== Period 1982–2015: A fully responsible local authority ==
=== Institutional evolution ===
==== Cantonal redistricting of 1982 ====
With the decree of January 25, 1982, a new cantonal redistricting was implemented to increase the representation of urban areas. Four new cantons were created (Chécy, Ingré, Saint-Jean-le-Blanc, and Orléans-la Source), eleven were reorganized, and one was renamed:

- The canton of Saint-Jean-de-Braye was divided into two cantons: Saint-Jean-de-Braye and Chécy;
- The canton of Olivet was divided into two cantons: Olivet and Saint-Jean-le-Blanc;
- The canton of Orléans-Saint-Marceau–La Source was divided into two cantons: Orléans-Saint-Marceau and Orléans-La Source;
- The canton of Ingré was created (with the communes of Saran, Ingré, La Chapelle, and Ormes).
- The compositions and territorial boundaries of the cantons of Meung-sur-Loire, Saint-Jean-de-la-Ruelle, Fleury-les-Aubrais, Ingré, Orléans-Bourgogne, Orléans-Carmes, Orléans-Bannier, and Orléans-Saint-Marc were reorganized, the canton of Orléans-Saint-Marc being renamed Orléans-Saint-Marc-Argonne. The number of cantons thus rose from 37 to 41.

==== Act I of decentralization (1982–2003) ====
The law of March 2, 1982, harmonized local authorities by stating in its Article 1: "Communes, departments, and regions shall be freely administered by elected councils." This measure was of crucial importance, since from then on, not only were deliberative bodies elected, but so were executive bodies. The four main changes were as follows:

- Administrative and financial supervision previously exercised by the Prefect over the acts of local authorities a priori and at his discretion disappeared. From then on, this control was carried out a posteriori (and no longer a priori), through the Prefect, administrative courts, and regional audit chambers;
- The General Council itself elected the executive authority of its decisions. It was no longer the Prefect who implemented departmental policies, but the President of the General Council;
- The State transferred blocks of responsibilities to departments;
- Financial aid granted by the State to local authorities was consolidated in the form of global allocations for operations, equipment, and decentralization.

==== Act II of decentralization (2003–2015) ====
In 2003, the Government adopted several measures presented as Act II of decentralization:

- The constitutional revision of March 28, 2003, on the decentralized organization of the Republic, which extended the responsibilities of local authorities and granted them in particular a right to experimentation.
- The law of August 13, 2004, on local freedoms and responsibilities, which listed all the new powers transferred by the State to local authorities. Departments thus inherited responsibility for certain sections of national roads. They were assigned a leading role in social action, notably assuming responsibility for all social assistance benefits. In social housing, most responsibilities were transferred to departments or intercommunal groups. In education, technical, maintenance, and service staff (TOS) of middle schools had to be recruited and managed by the departments.

=== Premises ===
The inauguration of the Hôtel du Département, the new headquarters of the General Council located on Rue Eugène Vignat, on October 12, 1984, marked the department's entry into a new era, that of decentralization. The building comprised five floors and 7,000 m² of usable floor space. The inauguration took place in the presence of Alain Poher, president of the Senate, and Georges Lemoine, Secretary of State for Overseas Departments and Territories. At the same time, the technical services were installed in premises located south of the Loire, on Rue de Châteaubriand.

A new departmental administrative building was constructed between 2009 and 2011 on Avenue des Droits de l'Homme in Orléans. Built according to low-energy environmental standards and labeled High Environmental Quality, it was the first administrative building in France to obtain this label.

=== Presidency from 1982 to 2015 ===
Kléber Malécot was elected president of the general council on March 28, 1979, and had therefore been at the head of the collectivity for three years when the decentralization laws were passed. He was easily re-elected to the presidency of the General Council until April 1, 1994, as well as to the Senate on September 25, 1963, and again on September 27, 1992. (Note: Allorant 2003, p. 176) Éric Doligé, a general councillor since 1985, succeeded him and was re-elected to the presidency until 2015. Mayor of Meung-sur-Loire from 1983 to 2001 and deputy of Loiret from 1988 to 2001, Éric Doligé has also served as senator of Loiret since 2001.

Chronology of Prefects and Presidents of the General Council from 1982 to 2015
Year	State			Department
Year	President	Prime Minister	Prefect	President
1982	François Mitterrand	Pierre Mauroy	Jean Rochet	Kléber Malécot
1983	François Mitterrand	Pierre Mauroy	Jean Terrade	Kléber Malécot
1984	François Mitterrand	Laurent Fabius	Jean Terrade	Kléber Malécot
1985	François Mitterrand	Laurent Fabius	Yves-Jean Bentegeac	Kléber Malécot
1986	François Mitterrand	Jacques Chirac	Paul Bernard	Kléber Malécot
1987	François Mitterrand	Jacques Chirac	Paul Bernard	Kléber Malécot
1988	François Mitterrand	Michel Rocard	Paul Bernard	Kléber Malécot
1989	François Mitterrand	Michel Rocard	Paul Bernard	Kléber Malécot
1990	François Mitterrand	Michel Rocard	Paul Bernard	Kléber Malécot
1991	François Mitterrand	Édith Cresson	Hubert Blanc	Kléber Malécot
1992	François Mitterrand	Pierre Bérégovoy	Hubert Blanc	Kléber Malécot
1993	François Mitterrand	Édouard Balladur	Bernard Gérard	Kléber Malécot
1994	François Mitterrand	Édouard Balladur	Bernard Gérard	Éric Doligé
1995	Jacques Chirac	Alain Juppé	Bernard Gérard	Éric Doligé
1996	Jacques Chirac	Alain Juppé	Bernard Gérard	Éric Doligé
1997	Jacques Chirac	Lionel Jospin	Jacques Barel	Éric Doligé
1998	Jacques Chirac	Lionel Jospin	Jacques Barel	Éric Doligé
1999	Jacques Chirac	Lionel Jospin	Patrice Magnier	Éric Doligé
2000	Jacques Chirac	Lionel Jospin	Patrice Magnier	Éric Doligé
2001	Jacques Chirac	Lionel Jospin	Jean-Pierre Lacroix	Éric Doligé
2002	Jacques Chirac	Jean-Pierre Raffarin	Jean-Pierre Lacroix	Éric Doligé
2003	Jacques Chirac	Jean-Pierre Raffarin	Jean-Pierre Lacroix	Éric Doligé
2004	Jacques Chirac	Jean-Pierre Raffarin	André Viau	Éric Doligé
2005	Jacques Chirac	Dominique de Villepin	André Viau	Éric Doligé
2006	Jacques Chirac	Dominique de Villepin	Jean-Michel Bérard	Éric Doligé
2007	Nicolas Sarkozy	François Fillon	Jean-Michel Bérard	Éric Doligé
2008	Nicolas Sarkozy	François Fillon	Bernard Fragneau	Éric Doligé
2009	Nicolas Sarkozy	François Fillon	Bernard Fragneau	Éric Doligé
2010	Nicolas Sarkozy	François Fillon	Gérard Moisselin	Éric Doligé
2011	Nicolas Sarkozy	François Fillon	Michel Camux	Éric Doligé
2012	François Hollande	Jean-Marc Ayrault	Pierre-Etienne Bisch	Éric Doligé
2013	François Hollande	Jean-Marc Ayrault	Pierre-Etienne Bisch	Éric Doligé
2014	François Hollande	Manuel Valls	Michel Jau	Éric Doligé
2015	François Hollande	Manuel Valls	Michel Jau	Hugues Saury

=== Departmental activity ===
==== Health and social action ====
Beginning in 1983, the field of social welfare and action underwent the most far-reaching decentralization, with the law of July 22 transferring to the Departments child welfare, assistance to disabled adults (home help, compensatory allowance for a third party) and the elderly, as well as family and child health protection and the fight against social scourges. Five and nine years later came the laws on the Minimum Insertion Income (RMI, in 1988) and housing for the most disadvantaged (1992), which further expanded the scope of the departments' responsibilities.

In Loiret, the general council created in 1997 seven Territorial Units of Social Action (UTAS), which later became Territorial Units of Solidarity (UTS), then "Department Houses." They were established in Pithiviers, Gien, Montargis, Orléans North, Orléans South, Jargeau, and Meung-sur-Loire. Each has a multidisciplinary team: educators, childcare nurses, doctors, psychologists, and social workers. The UTS welcome, listen to, and support all people in difficult or precarious situations, with particular attention to child protection. Coverage across the department is ensured by 49 infant consultation centers and 90 social service offices in the municipalities.

Since January 1, 2002, the general council has implemented the Personalized Autonomy Allowance (APA), which replaced the Specific Dependency Benefit (PSD). This benefit, intended for dependent elderly persons (60 years and older), aims to help them cover the costs related to the daily assistance they need for carrying out routine acts of life. The APA can be paid to them regardless of their place of residence (at home or in an institution) and their income level.

The first departmental plans for establishments, social and medico-social services were adopted by the Loiret General Council in June 1997. The second-generation plans, in favor of disabled persons on one hand, children, families, and youth on the other, and finally elderly persons, fell within the framework of the law of January 2, 2002, reforming social and medico-social action, and were adopted at the December 2003 session, covering the period 2004–2009. Regarding children and families, the legislative foundations of policy were profoundly revised by the law of March 2007, and a new Plan in favor of Children, Families, and Youth was established for the period 2011–2015.

Among the flagship measures of the law for equality of rights and opportunities, participation, and citizenship of disabled persons of February 11, 2005, was the creation, in each department, of a Departmental House for Disabled Persons (MDPH). That of Loiret was created in 2006. Designed as a single access point to rights, schemes, and services for these individuals, the MDPH extended its reach through branches installed in the UTS for better territorial proximity. The MDPH took over the responsibilities previously held by the COTOREP and the Departmental Commission for Special Education (CDES). It receives all applications for rights or benefits falling under the Commission on Rights and Autonomy. In 2009, the Departmental House for Disabled Persons of Loiret inaugurated the "culture hub," a pioneering service in France that facilitates access to culture and leisure for disabled persons.

The orientation law on combating exclusion of July 29, 1998, relaunched the implementation of the right to housing by strengthening the tools established in 1990. With the launch in 2009 of the Departmental Action Plan for Housing Disadvantaged Persons (PDALPD), the State and the Departments joined forces for housing the most destitute. Named Housing Solidarity Plan 45 in Loiret, this plan, run by the Departmental Housing Information Agency (Adil), improves the housing conditions of households in difficulty by preventing evictions and fighting against substandard housing or energy poverty.

==== Roads ====
The department owns the departmental road network, which in 1982 extended 3,244 kilometers and included 566 engineering structures. As such, it ensures its maintenance, management (classification, declassification, etc.), and improvement. In 1981, equipment expenditures for this departmental road network exceeded 100 million francs, and maintenance costs approached 40 million. At its meeting of September 30, 1982, the general council approved an exceptional program for improving the departmental network. Its three-year cost was about 150 million francs. (Note: Blanquet 1994, p. 196)

The Departmental Assembly, at its session from September 29 to October 1, 1998, approved a departmental road plan defining, for each category, objectives for development, equipment, and maintenance, and various projects envisioned for 2015 to improve traffic flow, safety, and the quality of the road heritage. Among the major projects were three Loire crossings (Jargeau, Sully-sur-Loire, and Meung-sur-Loire / Cléry-Saint-André), various town bypasses (Bazoches-les-Gallerandes, Dordives, Lorris, Fay-aux-Loges, Le Bardon, Beaune-la-Rolande, etc.), and route improvements (RD 940, RD 122). The plan also provided for the completion of the 2000–2006 planning contract signed between the State and the region concerning national roads (Pithiviers bypass, intersection upgrades on RN 20 and RN 154).

The Gien bypass, 10 km long, with eight engineering structures and several roundabouts and interchanges, was opened to traffic on November 17, 2000. The departmental road 940 linking northern Gien to RN7 was converted into a dual carriageway between 2006 and 2008. Estimated at over 20 million euros, the operation was 50% financed by the department. The northern bypass of Pithiviers was opened in July 2011. The upgrade of the RD 940 south of Gien (€27 million) was completed in summer 2012.

==== Orléans canal ====
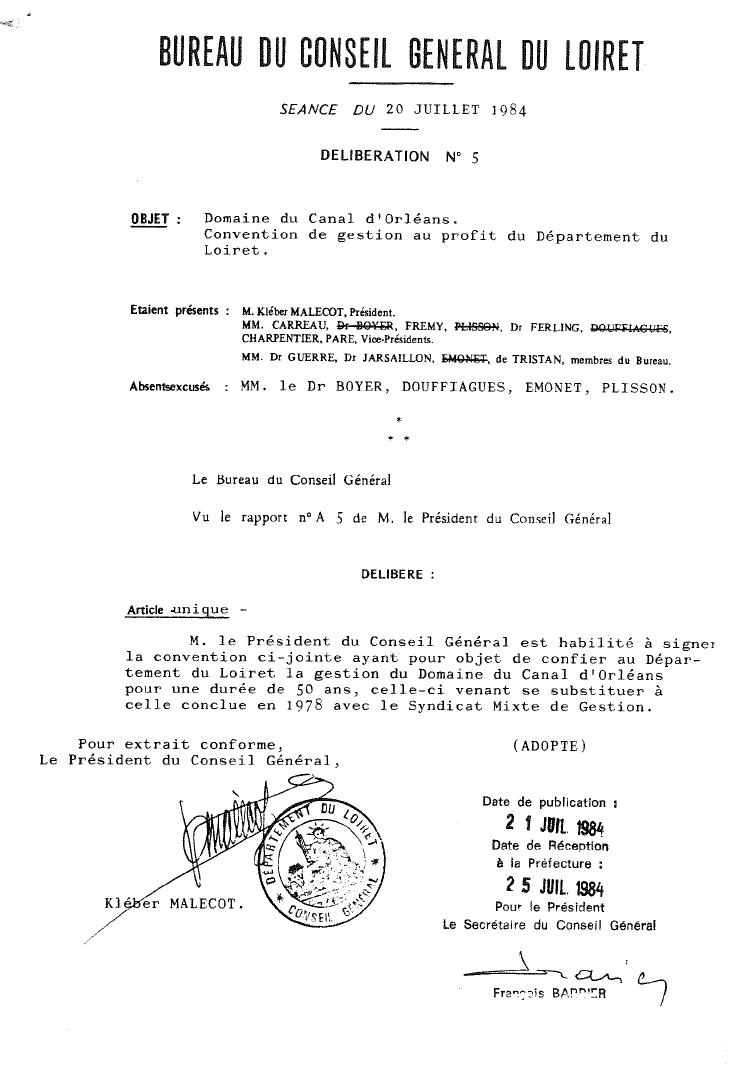
Facsimile of the deliberation of July 20, 1984 authorizing the President of the General Council to sign the agreement entrusting the management of the Canal d'Orléans to the Department for 50 years.

The section of the Orléans Canal between the Folie lock (commune of Châlette-sur-Loing) and Combleux was leased by the State to the joint management syndicate of the Orléans Canal by a lease agreement of November 22, 1978, for a period of 18 consecutive years expiring March 31, 1996. However, the lease between the State and the syndicate was terminated in 1984, and management of the property was entrusted to the Department of Loiret by decision of the minister in charge of state property on September 4, 1984. An agreement was signed on December 28, 1984, between the Directorate General of Taxes and the Department to continue, while intensifying, the rehabilitation program begun by the syndicate, while preserving the natural character of the property. The duration of the agreement was set at 50 years, beginning January 1, 1985, and ending December 31, 2035. Meanwhile, in 1985, the department entrusted the day-to-day management of the property to the joint syndicate managing the Orléans Canal. Between 1985 and 2014, the general council restored 13 of the 27 locks of the canal, developed towpaths and Loire riverbanks (including two leisure centers), renovated 40 buildings on the canal property (including 22 lock houses), and protected the banks.

In 2005, the department considered reopening the canal to navigation by 2020, but in 2006 a financial disagreement arose between the department and the State over the terms of transferring ownership of the canal, leading the department to suspend all investment works. As of 2014, this disagreement still persisted.

==== Transport ====
Since the Law on the Orientation of Domestic Transport (LOTI) of December 30, 1982, the department has been responsible for organizing interurban departmental transport, which includes regular services and on-demand road transport services. These may themselves be delegated, by the department, to secondary transport organizing authorities such as municipalities or their associations. Also part of non-urban transport services of departmental interest are road substitution services for rail services not included in the regional transport plan (for example, buses or coaches), and services of national interest organized and implemented by the departments on behalf of the State. The law of January 29, 1993, concerning the prevention of corruption and transparency in economic life and public procedures, codified in article L.1411-1 of the General Code of Local Authorities, clarified the awarding of transport contracts. These may now fall either under public service contracts subject to the Public Procurement Code or under public service delegations subject to the provisions of article L.1411-1 of the CGCT.

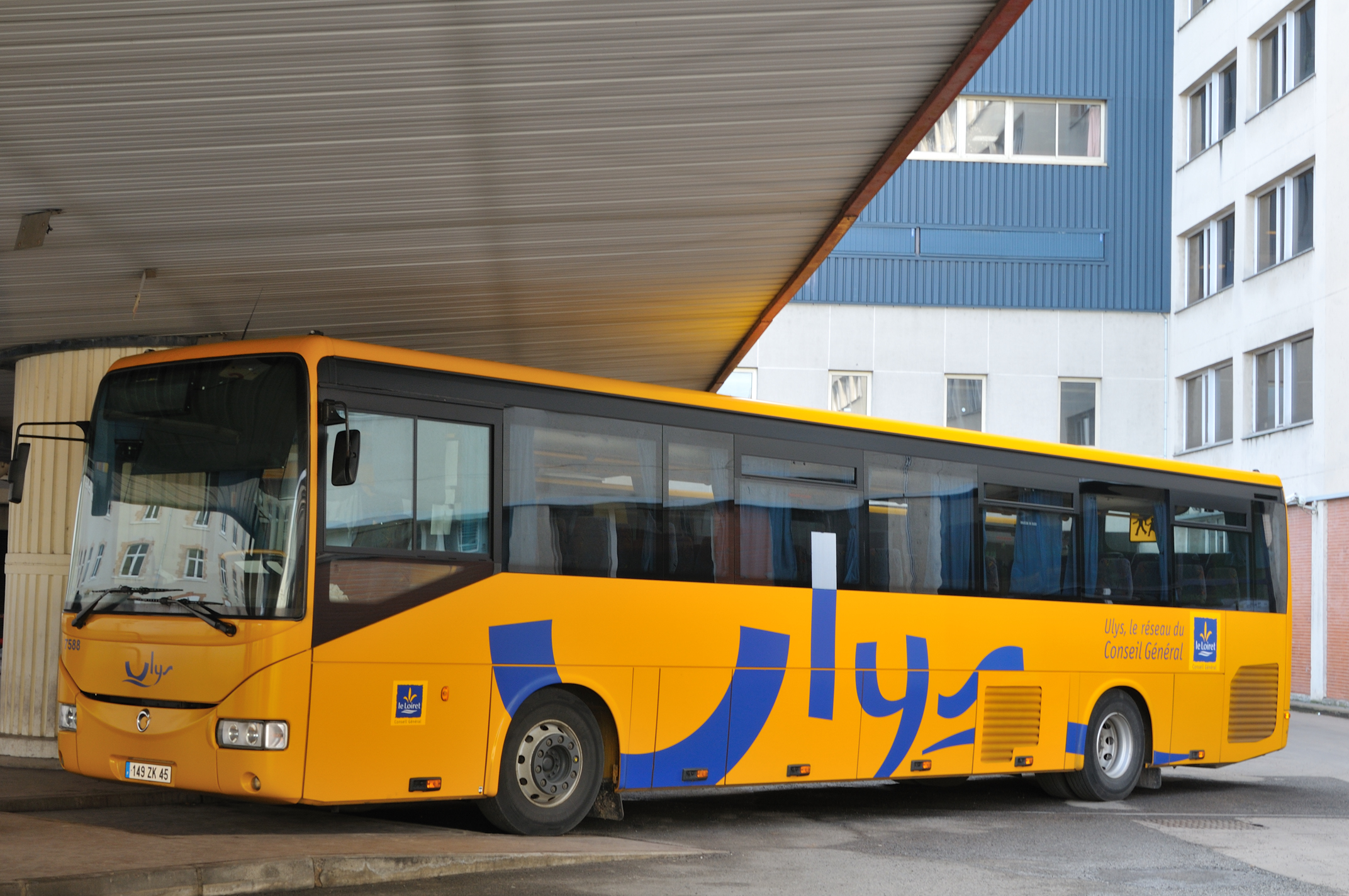
Coach belonging to the Ulys network, the public transport network entrusted by the department to the Odulys group under a public service delegation agreement.

In 1984, the department signed an agreement with TREC to provide, on a one-year trial basis, an express bus service between Orléans, Montargis, and Pithiviers. As the trial proved successful, the department, together with the city of Orléans, decided to build a new bus station near the new complex at Place d'Arc. A budget line of 800,000 francs was included in the 1986 budget for this purpose. With a final cost of 20 million francs, this bus station was located at the corner of Rue Émile-Zola and Rue Marcel-Proust. It was integrated into the extension of the Natural Sciences Museum, along with offices, housing, and parking, and connected to the railway station's commercial complex via a pedestrian gallery. (Note: Blanquet 1994, p. 199)

Within this framework, in September 2003, the Loiret Department delegated the management of the Ulys transport network to the ODULYS Grouping under a public service delegation to a single operator. Between 2003 and 2004, 51 vehicles were painted orange for regular lines. Given the impact, RVL extended this to school transport. To encourage the people of Loiret to favor public transport, which is less polluting but also safer and sometimes faster than cars, in September 2006 the department introduced a flat fare of 2 euros regardless of the journey. School transport was free until the 2012 school year.

As of 2015, Ulys operated 346 special school routes, 26 regular lines, and 27 on-demand transport routes.

==== Education and sports ====
The department is responsible for the construction, expansion, and equipment of middle schools, of which it became the owner under the law of July 22, 1983 (Act I of decentralization). Since the law of August 13, 2004 (Act II of decentralization), the technical staff of the middle schools (excluding teaching and management staff) have been placed at the disposal of the General Council for a two-year period. At the end of this period, they either opted for integration into a specific employment framework of the territorial civil service or chose to remain in a secondment position for an unlimited duration.

==== Culture and heritage ====
Already the owner of Sully-sur-Loire Castle, acquired in 1962, and Beaugency Castle, the department acquired Chamerolles Castle (16th century), in the heart of the Orléans forest, in 1987 and, after five years of restoration, opened it to the public in 1992. In total, nearly 13 million euros made possible the renovation and development of the Renaissance gardens, the roofs, the moats, as well as the acquisition of collections.

In 2013, the department sold Beaugency Castle to a private investor, the Patrice Besse Group.

== Period from 2015 to the present: New Institutional Reform ==
=== Evolution of the institution ===
A new territorial division came into effect in March 2015, defined by the decree of February 25, 2014, in application of the laws of May 17, 2013 (organic law 2013-402 and law 2013-403). From these elections onward, departmental councilors are elected by mixed-gender binomial majority vote. The voters of each canton elect to the Departmental Council, the new name of the General Council, two members of different sexes who run as a pair of candidates. Departmental councilors are elected for six years by two-round binomial majority voting, with access to the second round requiring 12.5% of registered voters in the first round. In addition, the entirety of departmental councilors is renewed. This new voting system required a redistricting of the cantons, the number of which was halved and rounded up to the nearest odd number. In Loiret, the number of cantons thus decreased from 41 to 21.

=== Presidency from 2015 onward ===
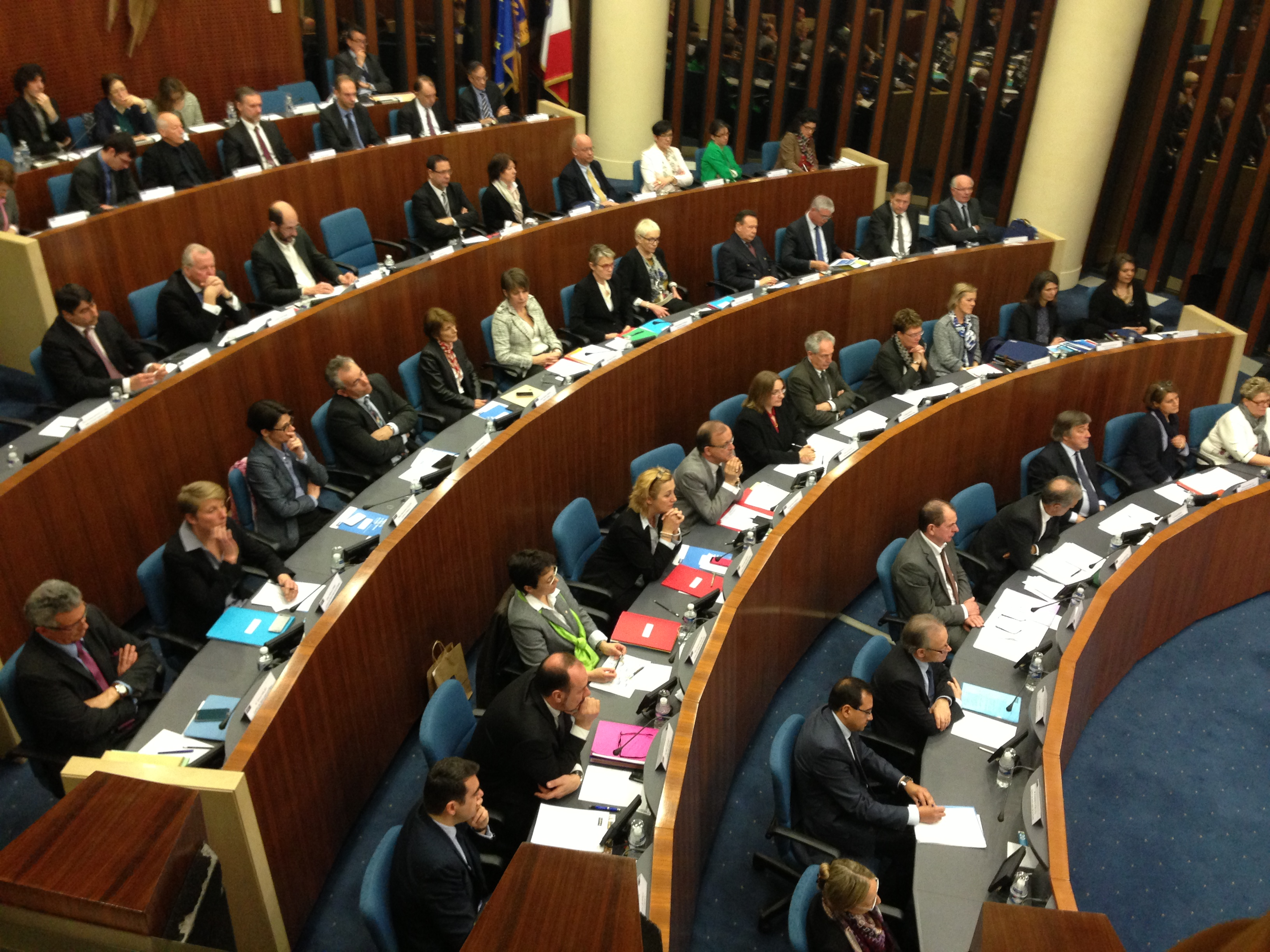
The newly elected departmental council, meeting in session on April 3, 2015.

The first elections under these new provisions were held on March 22 and 29, 2015. The UMP–departmental majority won 36 of the 42 seats in the assembly, compared with 27 right-wing and 14 left-wing elected officials in the previous term. At the same time, the number of women increased from 8 to 21. Hugues Saury was elected president of the departmental council by a large majority on April 2, 2015.

Chronology of Prefects and Presidents of the General Council from 2015 to the Present
Year	State			Department
Year	President	Prime Minister	Prefect	President
2016	François Hollande	Manuel Valls	Michel Jau	Hugues Saury
2016	François Hollande	Manuel Valls	Nacer Meddah	Hugues Saury
2017	Emmanuel Macron	Édouard Philippe	Jean-Marc Falcone	Marc Gaudet
2018	Emmanuel Macron	Édouard Philippe	Jean-Marc Falcone	Marc Gaudet
2019	Emmanuel Macron	Édouard Philippe	Jean-Marc Falcone	Marc Gaudet

== See also ==
- History of the Loiret

== Bibliography ==
- Prudhomme, Louis Marie (1798). Dictionnaire géographique et méthodique de la République française en 120 départements, volume 1 [Geographical and Methodical Dictionary of the French Republic in 120 Departments, Volume 1] (in French). Paris: Louis Marie Prudhomme.
- Poitou, Christian (1982). Paroisses et communes de France : le Loiret [Parishes and municipalities of France: Loiret.] (in French). Paris: Éditions du Centre national de la recherche scientifique. ISBN 2-222-02930-9.
- Duvergier, J.B (1836). Collection complète des lois, décrets, ordonnances, règlements, avis au conseil d'Etat -Tome 1 [Complete collection of laws, decrees, ordinances, regulations, notices to the Council of State - Volume 1] (in French). Paris: Guyot et Scribe.
- Blanquet, Henri (1994). 1940 - 1990. Cinquante ans de Loiret. La passion d'un Président [1940–1990. Fifty years of Loiret. The passion of a president] (in French). Orléans: Éditions Spirales.
- Gaudillère, Bernard (1995). Atlas historique des circonscriptions électorales françaises [Historical Atlas of French Electoral Districts] (in French). Geneva: Librairie Droz SA. ISBN 978-2-600-00065-9.
- Motte, Claude; Séguy, Isabelle; Théré, Christine (2003). Communes d'hier, communes d'aujourd'hui : les communes de la France [Communes of yesterday, communes of today: the communes of France] (in French). Paris: Ined. ISBN 978-2-7332-1028-4.
- Allorant, Pierre (2003). Le président du Conseil général du Loiret de 1871 à 1982 : mémoire d'histoire du droit [The President of the Loiret General Council from 1871 to 1982: a history of law] (in French). Orléans: Presses Universitaires d'Orléans. ISBN 2-913454-13-5.
- Donier, Virginie (2014). Droit des collectivités territoriales [Local government law] (in French). Paris: Dalloz. ISBN 978-2-247-10592-2.
- Agulhon, Maurice (1970). La République au village [The Republic in the village] (in French). Paris: Plon.
- Blanc, Jacques; Remond, Bruno (1989). Les collectivités locales [Local authorities] (in French). Paris: FNSP.
- Bodineau, P; Verpeaux, Michel (1993). Histoire de la décentralisation [History of decentralization]. Que sals-je? (in French). Paris: PUF.
- Bonnaud-Delamare, R (1951). Loi du 10 août 1971 relative aux Conseils généraux, suivie du décret du 12 juillet 1893 portant règlement sur la comptabilité départementale [Law of August 10, 1971, relating to General Councils, followed by the decree of July 12, 1893, establishing regulations on departmental accounting] (in French). Paris: Recueil Sirey.
- Bourdon, Jacques; Pontier, Jean-Marie (1992). Le Conseil général [The General Council]. Que sats~je ? (in French). Paris: PUF.
- Burdin, Brigitte (1998). Les conseillers généraux du Loiret de 1833 à nos jours [The general councilors of Loiret from 1833 to the present day] (in French). Orléans: Imprimerie départementale du Loiret.
- Chapman, Brian (1955). L'Administration locale en France [Local government in France] (in French). Paris: Cahiers de la FNSP.
- de Courson, Jacques (2000). Les élus locaux : Qui sont-ils ? Que font-ils ? Comment travaillent-ils ? [Local elected officials: Who are they? What do they do? How do they work?] (in French). Paris: Editions d'Organisation.
- Debal, Jacques (1963). Histoire d'Orléans et de son terroir tome III : ds 1870 à nos jours [History of Orleans and its region, Volume III: From 1870 to the present day] (in French). Roanne: Editions Horvath.
- Deyon, Pierre (1996). L'Etat face au pouvoir local [The state versus local government] (in French). Paris: Editions locales de France.
- Dosiere, R; Portier, J.-C; Mastias, J (1994). Le Conseil général [The General Council] (in French). Paris: Editions de l'Atelier.
- Escudier, Antoine-Jean (1964). Le Conseil général [The General Council] (in French). Paris: Berger-Levrault.
- Escudier, Antoine-Jean; Vidot, M.-H (1985). Le Conseil général et le département à l'heure de la décentralisation [The General Council and the department at a time of decentralization] (in French). Paris: Berger-Levrault.
- Goguel, François (1981). Chroniques électorales de la IVe République [Election Chronicles of the Fourth Republic] (in French). Paris: Presses de la FNSP.
- Guelec, Agnès; Guelec, Jean (1993). Le département, espace et institution [The department, space, and institution] (in French). Paris: CNFPT-Dunod.
- Longepierre, Michel (1971). Les conseillers généraux dans le système administratif français [General councilors in the French administrative system] (in French). Paris: Cujas.
- Mabileau, Albert (1991). Le système local en France [The local system in France] (in French). Paris: Montchrestien.
- Marchand, Marie-Hélène (1970). Les conseillers généraux en France depuis 1945 [General councilors in France since 1945] (in French). Paris: F.N.S.P.Armand Coin.
- Marlin, François (1994). La République, la paix, la liberté, le Front populaire en terre radicale : le Loiret 1934-1939 [The Republic, peace, freedom, the Popular Front in radical territory: the Loiret region, 1934–1939] (in French). Paris: Université Paris VIII Saint-Denis.
- Peiser, Gustave (1968). Le Departement [The Department] (in French). Paris: Dalloz.
- Retournard, François (1964). L'Assemblée des présidents des Conseils généraux dans la vie publique française depuis 1946 [The Assembly of Presidents of General Councils in French public life since 1946] (in French). Paris: F.N.S.P.. Centra d'étude de la via politique française.
- Verbeke, Michel (1964). Pierre Dézarnaulds ( 1879-1975). Un grand notable radical dans les années trente [Pierre Dézarnaulds (1879–1975). A prominent radical figure in the 1930s] (in French). Orléans: Faculté des Lettres d'Orléans.
