= List of senators of Loiret =

Location of Loiret in France

Following is a list of senators of Loiret, people who have represented the department of Loiret in the Senate of France.

== Third Republic ==
Senators for Loiret under the French Third Republic were:

- Antoine Dumesnil (1876-1888)
- Henry Jahan (1876-1879)
- Paul-Alexandre Robert de Massy (1879-1888)
- Louis Adolphe Cochery (1888-1900)
- Ernest Fousset (1888-1900)
- Albert Viger (1900-1920)
- Gustave Alasseur (1900-1906)
- Ernest Guingand (1906-1920)
- Marcel Donon (1920-1940)
- Fernand Rabier (1920-1933)
- Henri Roy (1920-1940)
- Eugène Turbat (1933-1940)

== Fourth Republic ==
Senators for Loiret under the French Fourth Republic were:

- Jules Delmas (1946-1948)
- Pierre de Félice (1946-1951)
- Claude Lemaitre-Basset (1948-1955)
- Lucien Perdereau (1951-1959)
- Maurice Charpentier (1955-1959)

== Fifth Republic ==
Senators for Loiret under the French Fifth Republic:

Term	Name	Group	Notes
1959–1965	Lucien Perdereau	Centre Républicain d'Action Rurale et Sociale	
1959–1965	Maurice Charpentier	Républicains et Indépendants	Died in office 19 August 1965
1959–1965	Maurice Gallard	none	Replaced Maurice Charpentier 20 August 1965
1965–1974	Lucien Perdereau	Centre Républicain d'Action Rurale et Sociale	
1965–1974	Pierre de Félice	Gauche Démocratique	
1974–1983	Louis Boyer	Républicains et Indépendants	
1974–1983	Kléber Malécot	Union Centriste	
1983–1992	Louis Boyer	Républicains et Indépendants	
1983–1992	Kléber Malécot	Union Centriste	
1983–1992	Paul Masson	Rassemblement pour la République	
1992–2001	Louis Boyer	Républicains et Indépendants	
1992–2001	Kléber Malécot	Union Centriste	
1992–2001	Paul Masson	Rassemblement pour la République	
2001–2011	Éric Doligé	Les Républicains	
2001–2011	Janine Rozier	Union pour un Mouvement Populaire	
2001–2011	Jean-Pierre Sueur	Socialiste et républicain	
2011–2017	Jean-Pierre Sueur	Socialiste et républicain	
2011–2017	Éric Doligé	Les Républicains	
2011–2017	Jean-Noël Cardoux	Les Républicains	
2017–present	Jean-Pierre Sueur	Socialiste et républicain	
2017–present	Hugues Saury	Les Républicains	
2017–present	Jean-Noël Cardoux	Les Républicains	

== Sources ==
- Liste des anciens sénateurs de la IIIème République par circonscription (in French), Sénat de France
- Liste des anciens sénateurs de la IVème République par circonscription (in French), Sénat de France
- Liste des anciens sénateurs de la Vème République par circonscription (in French), Sénat de France
- Liste par département – Loiret (in French), Sénat de France
