= Fleury-les-Aubrais =

- Commune
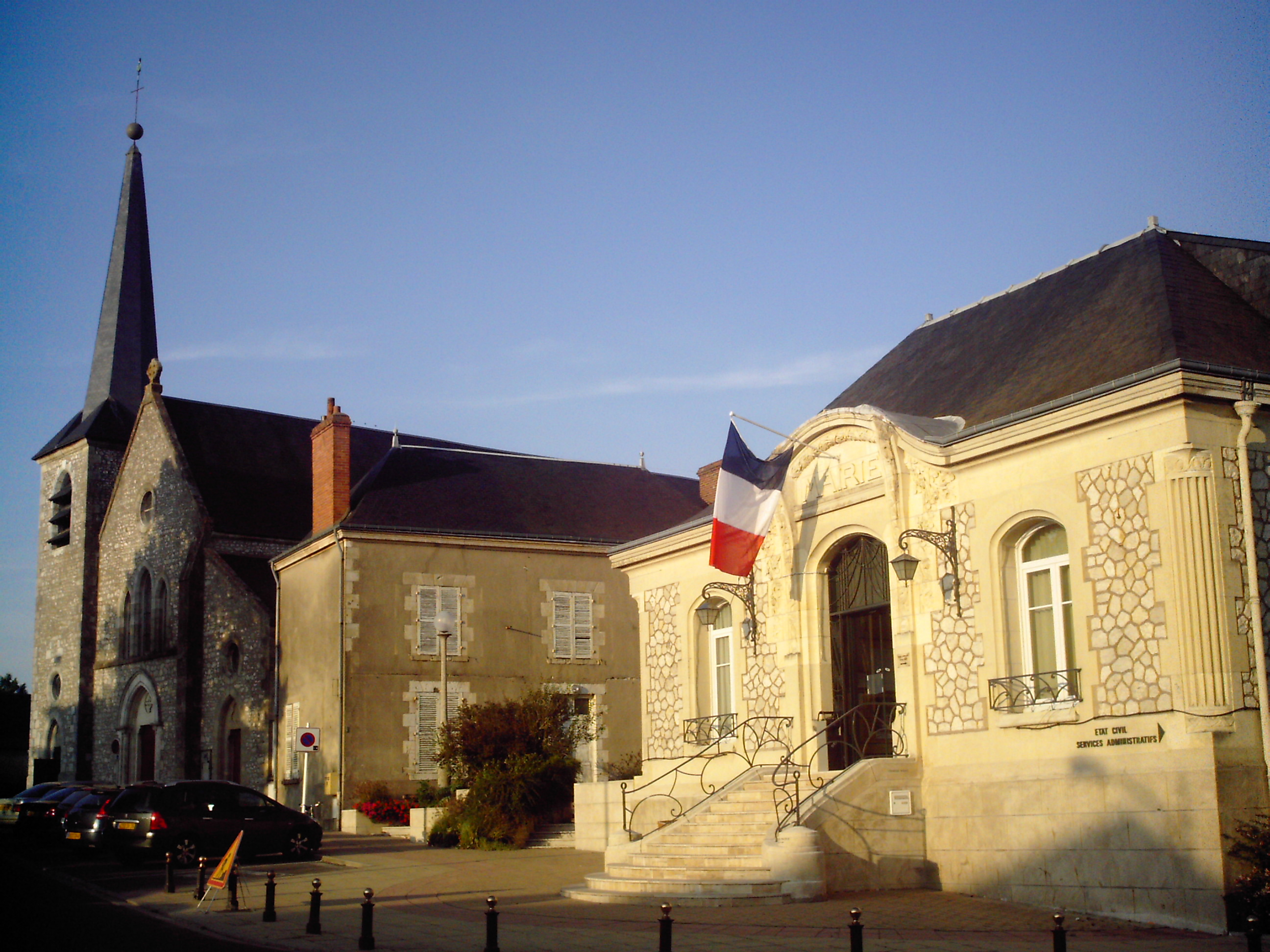
- The church and the Hôtel de Ville

- Coat of arms
- Location of Fleury-les-Aubrais
- Location within France Location within Centre-Val de Loire
- Coordinates: 47°55′52″N 1°55′16″E
- Country: France
- Region: Centre-Val de Loire
- Department: Loiret
- Arrondissement: Orléans
- Canton: Fleury-les-Aubrais
- Intercommunality: Orléans Métropole

Government
  - Mayor (2020–2026): Carole Canette
- Area^{1}: 10.12 km^{2} (3.91 sq mi)
- Elevation: 125 m (410 ft)
- Highest elevation: 133 m (436 ft)
- Lowest elevation: 109 m (358 ft)
- Population (2023): 21,804
  - Density: 2,155/km^{2} (5,580/sq mi)
- Demonym(s): Fleuryssois, Fleuryssoise
- Time zone: UTC+01:00 (CET)
  - Summer (DST): UTC+02:00 (CEST)
- INSEE/Postal code: 45147 /45400
- ^{1} French Land Register data, which excludes lakes, ponds, glaciers > 1 km^{2} (0.386 sq mi or 247 acres) and river estuaries.

Fleury-les-Aubrais (French pronunciation: [fløʁi le.z‿obʁɛ]) is a commune in the Loiret department, Centre-Val de Loire, France. It is a northern suburb of Orléans.

== History ==
The Hôtel de Ville was completed in 1928.

As a part of German-occupied France, the town's railway station was destroyed in 1944 by the Combined Bomber Offensive.

== Population ==
Historical population

Year	Pop.	±% p.a.
1793	764	—
1800	772	+0.15%
1806	927	+3.10%
1821	908	−0.14%
1831	1,043	+1.40%
1836	1,054	+0.21%
1841	1,003	−0.99%
1846	1,032	+0.57%
1851	1,151	+2.21%
1856	1,109	−0.74%
1861	1,155	+0.82%
1866	1,146	−0.16%
1872	1,222	+1.08%
1876	1,302	+1.60%
1881	1,393	+1.36%
1886	1,666	+3.64%
1891	1,733	+0.79%
1896	1,961	+2.50%
1901	2,134	+1.71%

Year	Pop.	±% p.a.
1906	2,351	+1.96%
1911	2,887	+4.19%
1921	4,503	+4.55%
1926	5,043	+2.29%
1931	6,016	+3.59%
1936	6,818	+2.53%
1946	6,321	−0.75%
1954	8,521	+3.80%
1962	10,756	+2.95%
1968	13,180	+3.45%
1975	16,842	+3.56%
1982	19,758	+2.31%
1990	20,673	+0.57%
1999	20,690	+0.01%
2007	21,359	+0.40%
2012	20,843	−0.49%
2017	21,026	+0.17%
2023	21,804	+0.61%

Source: EHESS and INSEE (1968-2023)

== Notable people ==
- Antoine Carré, politician
- Josué Escartin, footballer
- Pierre Perroy, politician

== See also ==
- Communes of the Loiret department
