= Ingré =

- Commune
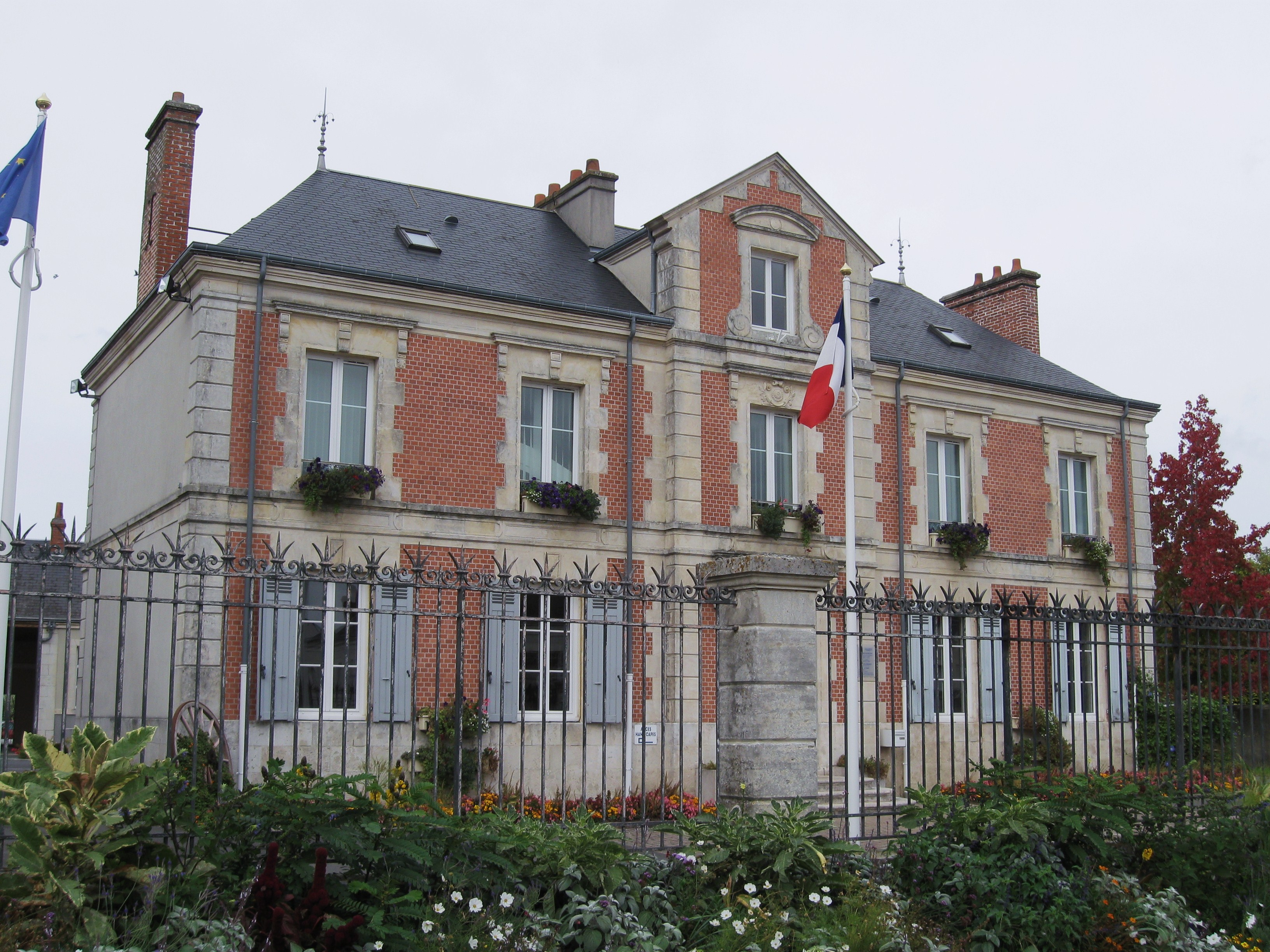
- The town hall in Ingré

- Coat of arms
- Location of Ingré
- Location within France Location within Centre-Val de Loire
- Coordinates: 47°55′16″N 1°49′30″E
- Country: France
- Region: Centre-Val de Loire
- Department: Loiret
- Arrondissement: Orléans
- Canton: Saint-Jean-de-la-Ruelle
- Intercommunality: Orléans Métropole

Government
  - Mayor (2020–2026): Christian Dumas
- Area^{1}: 20.82 km^{2} (8.04 sq mi)
- Highest elevation: 133 m (436 ft)
- Lowest elevation: 103 m (338 ft)
- Population (2023): 10,062
  - Density: 483.3/km^{2} (1,252/sq mi)
- Demonym: Ingréen·ne
- Time zone: UTC+01:00 (CET)
  - Summer (DST): UTC+02:00 (CEST)
- INSEE/Postal code: 45169 /45140
- Website: www.ingre.fr
- ^{1} French Land Register data, which excludes lakes, ponds, glaciers > 1 km^{2} (0.386 sq mi or 247 acres) and river estuaries.

Ingré (French pronunciation: [ɛ̃ɡʁe]) is a commune in the Loiret department, central France. It is part of the urban area of Orléans.

== Population ==
Historical population
Year	Pop.	±% p.a.
1968	3,973	—
1975	4,505	+1.81%
1982	5,221	+2.13%
1990	5,880	+1.50%
1999	7,450	+2.66%
2007	7,969	+0.85%
2012	8,104	+0.34%
2017	9,087	+2.32%
2023	10,062	+1.71%
Source: INSEE

== Twin towns – sister cities ==
Ingré is twinned with:

- Castel Maggiore, Italy (2011)
- Drensteinfurt, Germany (2017)

== See also ==
- Communes of the Loiret department
