= Serge Grouard =

French politician

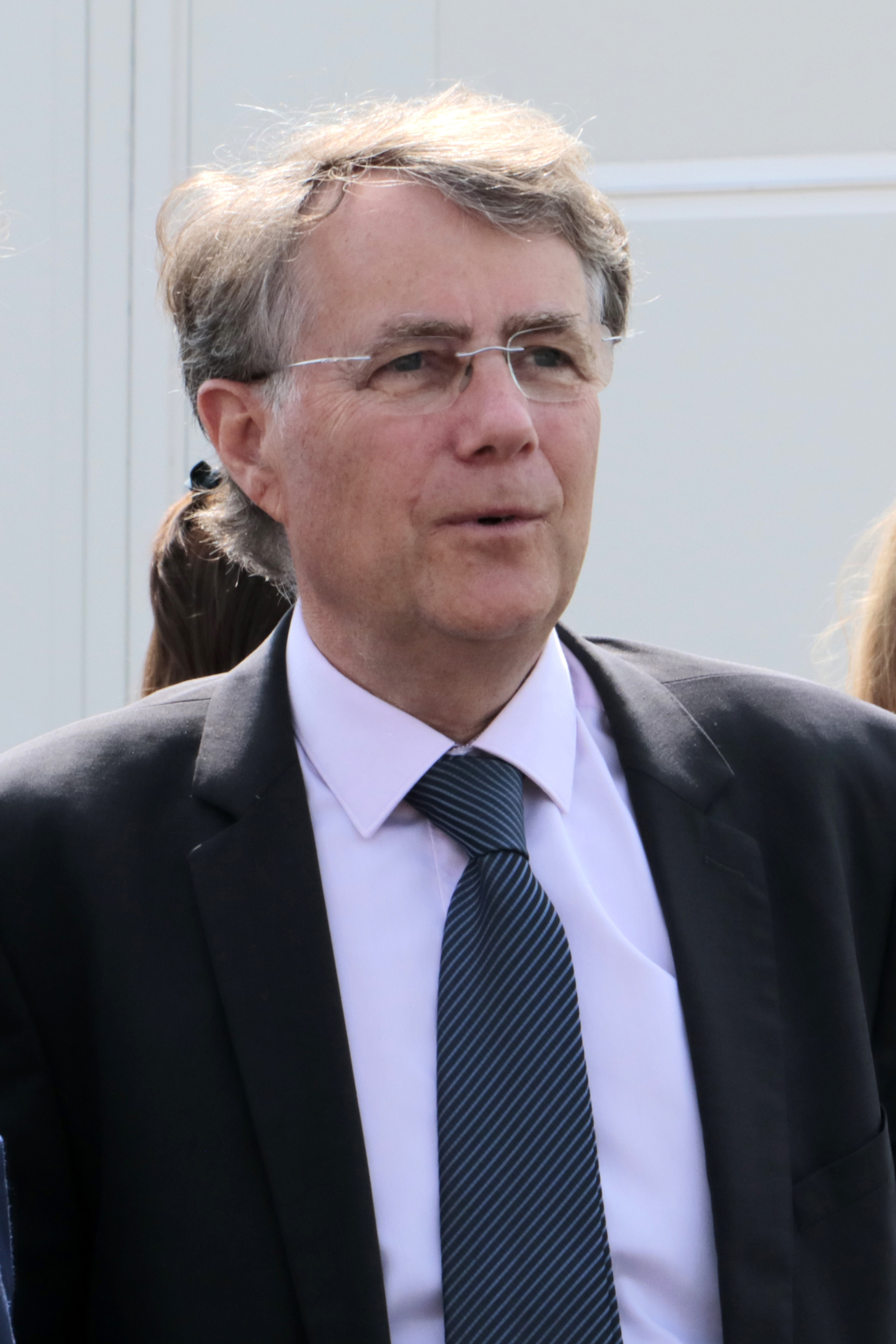
- Grouard in 2023

Mayor of Orléans
- Incumbent
- Assumed office 4 July 2020
- Preceded by: Olivier Carré
- In office 25 March 2001 – 28 June 2015
- Preceded by: Jean-Pierre Sueur
- Succeeded by: Olivier Carré

Member of the National Assembly for Loiret's 2nd constituency
- In office 19 June 2002 – 20 June 2017
- Preceded by: Éric Doligé
- Succeeded by: Caroline Janvier

Personal details
- Born: 19 March 1959 (age 67) Paris, France
- Party: UMP; The Republicans
- Education: Sciences Po

Serge Grouard (French pronunciation: [sɛʁʒ ɡʁuaʁ]; born 19 March 1959) is a French politician, and a former member of the National Assembly. He represented Loiret's 2nd constituency from 2002 to 2017, as a member of The Republicans. He served as mayor of Orléans between 2001 and 2015 and was reelected in 2020.
