= Emmanuel Duplessy =

French politician (born 1990)

Member of the French National Assembly for Loiret's 2nd constituency
- Incumbent
- Assumed office 18 July 2024
- Preceded by: Caroline Janvier

Personal details
- Born: 2 January 1990 (age 35)
- Political party: Génération.s; Socialist Party (2011–2013)

Emmanuel Duplessy (French pronunciation: [emanɥɛl dyplɛsi]; born 2 January 1990) is a French politician of Génération.s. He was elected member of the National Assembly for Loiret's 2nd constituency in 2024.

== Early life and career ==
Duplessy was a member of the Union Nationale des Étudiants de France, and of the Socialist Party from 2011 to 2013. In 2019 he launched the Génération.s movement in Orléans. He has been a municipal councillor in Orléans since 2020, and was a candidate for the 2022 legislative election.
