= Loiret's 2nd constituency =

Constituency of the National Assembly of France

2nd constituency of Loiret
- inline Constituency of the National Assembly of France

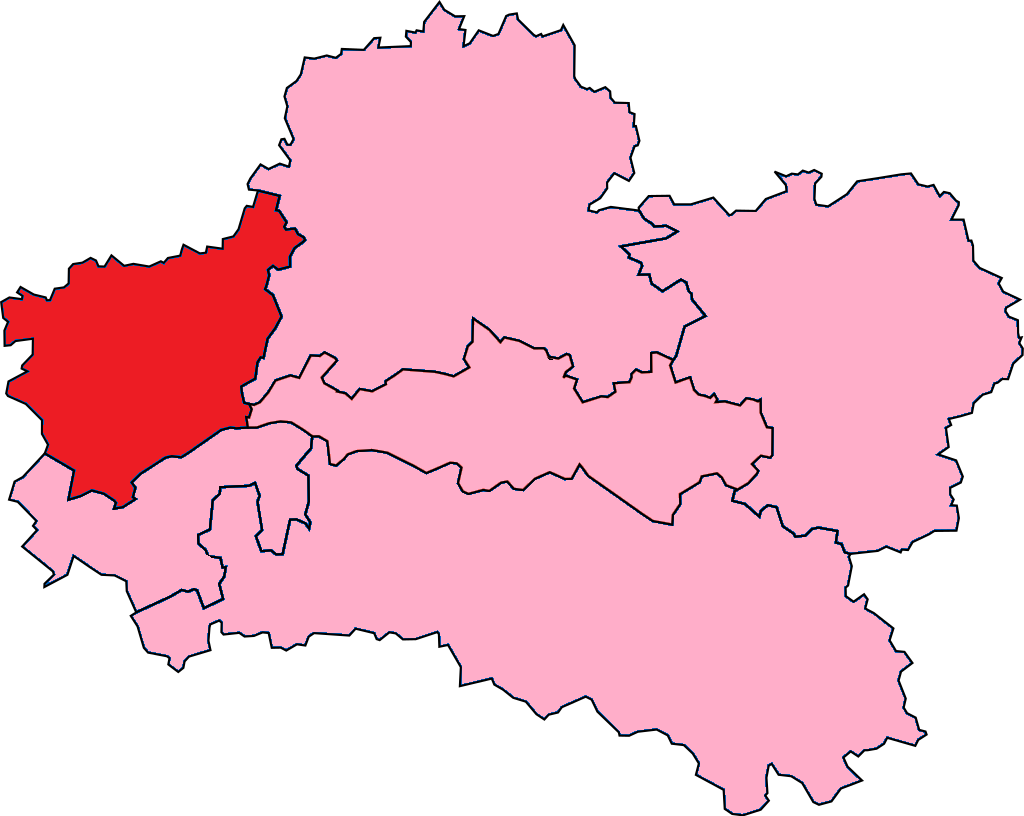
- Loiret's 2nd Constituency shown within Loiret
- Deputy: Emmanuel Duplessy; G.s
- Department: Loiret
- Cantons: Artenay, Ingré, Meung-sur-Loire, Orléans-Bannier, Orléans-Carmes, Patay, Saint-Jean-de-la-Ruelle
- Registered voters: 85273

The 2nd constituency of the Loiret (French: Deuxième circonscription du Loiret) is a French legislative constituency in the Loiret département. Like the other 576 French constituencies, it elects one MP using a two round electoral system.

== Description ==
The 2nd Constituency of the Loiret stretches from the north western suburbs of Orléans towards the western edge of department.

In common with the department the seat has historically tended towards the centre right, with Gaullist parties dominating. However, at the 2017 the constituency elected the centrist En Marche! candidate at the expense of the conservative LR incumbent.

== Assembly Members ==
Election	Member	Party
1988	Éric Doligé	RPR
1993	Éric Doligé	RPR
1997	Éric Doligé	RPR
2002	Serge Grouard	UMP
2007	Serge Grouard	UMP
2012	Serge Grouard	UMP
2017	Caroline Janvier	LREM
2022	Caroline Janvier	RE
2024	Emmanuel Duplessy	G.s

== Election results ==
=== 2024 ===
Candidate	Party	Alliance	First round			Second round		
Candidate	Party	Alliance	Votes	%	+/–	Votes	%	+/–
Elodie Babin	RN		18,957	32.91	+13.69	23,375	43.85	new
Emmanuel Duplessy	G.s	NFP	16,148	28.03	+2.91	29,934	56.15	+11.93
Caroline Janvier	RE	Ensemble	13,263	23.03	-6.07	withdrew		
Cyril Colas	LR	UDC	4,527	7.86	-3.83			
Yann Chaillou	DVG		1,951	3.39	-0.79			
Bruno Carrani	DIV		1,474	2.56	new			
Marie-Odile Duvillard	REC		716	1.24	-3.72			
Farida Megdoud	LO		388	0.67	-0.54			
Ahmed Aachboun	DIV		178	0.31	-0.31			
Votes			57,602	100.00		53,309	100.00	
Valid votes			57,602	97.90	-0.10	53,309	90.50	-0.56
Blank votes			836	1.42	+0.03	4,330	7.35	+1.17
Null votes			398	0.68	+0.08	1,264	2.15	-0.61
Turnout			58,836	66.41	+18.30	58,903	66.46	+20.15
Abstentions			29,765	33.59	-18.30	29,720	33.54	-20.15
Registered voters			88,601			88,623		
Result			G.s GAIN FROM RE					

=== 2022 ===
Legislative Election 2022: Loiret's 2nd constituency
Party	Candidate	Votes	%	±%
LREM (Ensemble)	Caroline Janvier	11,978	29.10	-6.30
G.s (NUPÉS)	Emmanuel Duplessy	10,338	25.12	+3.48
RN	Élodie Babin	7,911	19.22	+7.47
LR (UDC)	Alexandre Houssard	4,811	11.69	−16.07
REC	Jean-Paul Mallet	2,043	4.96	N/A
DVG	Yann Chaillou	1,720	4.18	N/A
DIV	Sarah Bertran	868	2.11	N/A
Others	N/A	1,490	-	−
Turnout		41,159	48.11	−0.82
2nd round result
LREM (Ensemble)	Caroline Janvier	20,535	55.78	+4.55
G.s (NUPÉS)	Emmanuel Duplessy	16,280	44.22	N/A
Turnout		36,815	46.31	+6.45
LREM hold				

=== 2017 ===
Legislative Election 2017: Loiret's 2nd constituency
Party	Candidate	Votes	%	±%
LREM	Caroline Janvier	14,770	35.40	N/A
LR	Serge Grouard	11,583	27.76	−9.48
FN	Nadine Boisgerault	4,902	11.75	−2.44
LFI	Olivier Hicter	4,051	9.71	N/A
EELV	Jean-Philippe Grand	3,424	8.21	+5.93
PCF	Mathieu Gallois	1,554	3.72	−1.89
Others	N/A	1,437		
Turnout		41,721	48.93	−9.67
2nd round result
LREM	Caroline Janvier	17,415	51.23	N/A
LR	Serge Grouard	16,579	48.77	−1.60
Turnout		33,994	39.86	−18.09
LREM gain from LR				

=== 2012 ===
Legislative Election 2012: Loiret's 2nd constituency
Party	Candidate	Votes	%	±%
UMP	Serge Grouard	17,879	37.24	−9.07
PS	Christophe Chaillou	17,444	36.33	+11.48
FN	Philippe Lecoq	6,812	14.19	+10.02
FG	Sylvie Dubois	2,694	5.61	−4.55
EELV	Moïsette Crosnier	1,097	2.28	−0.20
Others	N/A	2,086	4.35	−1.57
Turnout		48,012	58.60	−1.61
2nd round result
UMP	Serge Grouard	23,915	50.37	−4.28
PS	Christophe Chaillou	23,561	49.63	+4.28
Turnout		47,476	57.95	+0.31
UMP hold				

=== 2007 ===
Legislative Election 2007: Loiret's 2nd constituency
Party	Candidate	Votes	%	±%
UMP	Serge Grouard	22,460	46.31	+2.02
PS	Christophe Chaillou	12,052	24.85	−3.75
PCF	Michel Guerin	4,928	10.16	+3.23
MoDem	Cécile Richard	2,963	6.11	N/A
FN	Sabrina Duchesne	2,020	4.17	−7.65
LV	Moïsette Crosnier	1,204	2.48	N/A
Others	N/A	2,872	5.92	−0.40
Turnout		49,235	60.21	−4.92
Registered electors		81,766		
2nd round result
UMP	Serge Grouard	25,054	54.65	−2.94
PS	Christophe Chaillou	20,793	45.35	+2.94
Turnout		47,130	57.64	−2.66
Registered electors		81,766		
UMP hold				

=== 2002 ===
Legislative Election 2002: Loiret's 2nd constituency
Party	Candidate	Votes	%	±%
UMP	Serge Grouard	21,893	44.29	+11.64
PS	Christophe Chaillou	14,137	28.60	N/A
FN	Jean-Lin Lacapelle	5,845	11.82	−2.84
PCF	Véronique Daudin	3,427	6.93	−5.85
Cap21	Bruno Duval	1,009	2.04	N/A
Others	N/A	3,125	6.32	N/A
Turnout		50,440	65.13	−2.17
Registered electors		77,449		
2nd round result
UMP	Serge Grouard	25,939	57.59	+4.57
PS	Christophe Chaillou	19,103	42.41	N/A
Turnout		46,701	60.30	−10.59
Registered electors		77,448		
UMP hold				

=== 1997 ===
Legislative Election 1997: Loiret's 2nd constituency
Party	Candidate	Votes	%	±%
RPR	Eric Doligé	15,433	32.65	−12.36
LV	Nino-Anne Dupieux	10,608	22.44	+11.34
FN	Michel Rothe	6,930	14.66	+1.58
PCF	Michel Guérin	6,041	12.78	+1.72
LDI	Pascal Guérin	2,643	5.59	N/A
LO	Patrick Costard	1,646	3.48	+0.83
GE	Eric Warusfel	1,605	3.40	N/A
MEI	Bruno Duval	1,074	2.27	N/A
LCR	Renaldo Ruiz	665	1.41	N/A
MDC	Marcelle Boucherie	622	1.32	N/A
Turnout		49,906	67.30	−4.25
Registered electors		74,151		
2nd round result
RPR	Eric Doligé	25,926	53.02	−9.95
LV	Nino-Anne Dupieux	22,971	46.98	N/A
Turnout		52,564	70.89	+1.24
Registered electors		74,147		
RPR hold				

=== 1993 ===
Legislative Election 1993: Loiret's 2nd constituency
Party	Candidate	Votes	%	±%
RPR	Éric Doligé	21,967	45.01	
PS	Francois Lebon	7,261	14.88	
FN	Pierre Bonaccorsi	6,385	13.08	
LV	Bruno Duval	5,417	11.10	
PCF	Michel Guerin	5,397	11.06	
LO	Patrick Costard	1,295	2.65	
EXG	Michel Tissier	1,078	2.21	
NERNA	Lyliane Lemoine	1	0.00	
Turnout		51,449	71.55	
Registered electors		71,904		
2nd round result
RPR	Éric Doligé	29,027	62.97	
PS	Francois Lebon	17.069	37.03	
Turnout		50,084	69.65	
Registered electors		71,903		
RPR hold				
