= Caroline Janvier =

French politician (born 1982)

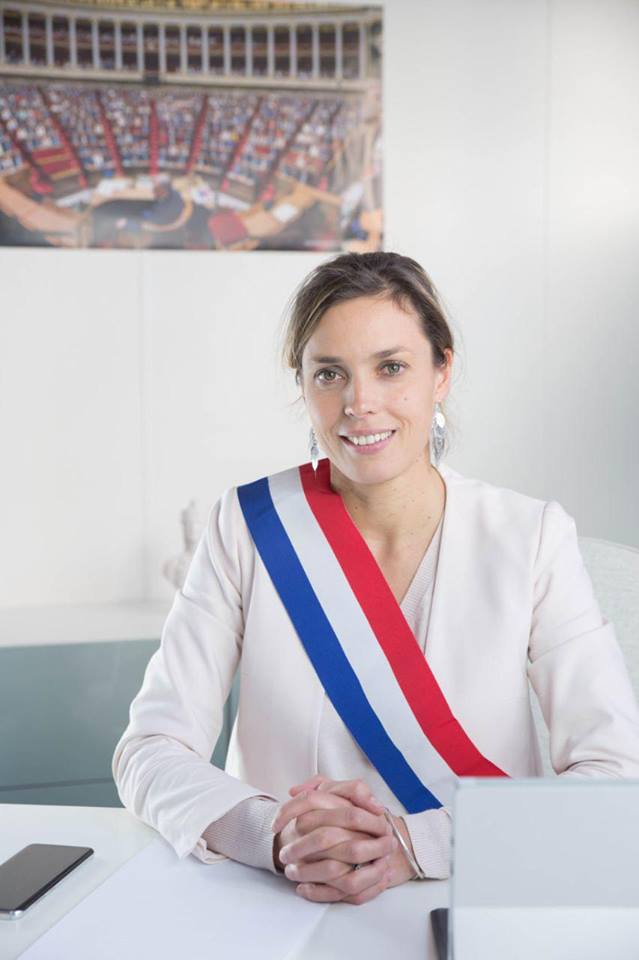

Member of the National Assembly for Loiret's 2nd constituency
- In office 21 June 2017 – 9 June 2024
- Preceded by: Serge Grouard
- Succeeded by: Emmanuel Duplessy

Personal details
- Born: 9 March 1982 (age 44) Nantes, France
- Party: Renaissance
- Education: Sciences Po

Caroline Janvier (French pronunciation: [kaʁɔlin ʒɑ̃vje]; born 9 March 1982) is a French politician who represented the 2nd constituency of the Loiret department in the National Assembly from 2017 to 2024. She is a member of Renaissance (RE, formerly La République En Marche!).

== Studies ==
Janvier grew up in Tours, Indre-et-Loire, before joining a literary preparatory class at Jules Ferry High School in Paris. She then studied at Sciences Po on the Dijon regional campus.

== Professional career ==
After her graduation from Sciences Po, Janvier worked for one year and a half in Kenya for the French Ministry of Economy and Finance, to establish relationships between French insurance companies and Eastern African banks. After that, she settled in the Loiret department to work in social affairs.

For six years, Janvier worked at the Aidaphi association (Association Interdépartementale pour le Développement des Actions en faveur des Personnes Handicapées et Inadaptées) as technical adviser, where she negotiated financial resources with the relevant public authorities (regional health authorities, departmental councils), managed the association's law monitoring and followed the association's various establishments and services. She also worked as independent consultant for various consulting firms in the medical and social sector.

== Political career ==
Janvier joined En Marche! (later La République En Marche!) from its launch in April 2016. She became a candidate in the 2017 French legislative election when she replaced the party's departmental point of contact (référent) Emmanuel Constantin when he was found ineligible due to his professional activity as a senior civil servant.

On 18 June 2017, Janvier was elected as the deputy to the National Assembly for Loiret's 2nd constituency, winning with 51.2% of the vote in the election's second round against former The Republicans deputy Serge Grouard.

In Parliament, Janvier is a member of the Committee on Social Affairs as well as of the Committee on European Affairs. In addition to her committee assignments, she chair the French-Russian Parliamentary Friendship Group and is a member of the French delegation to the Interparliamentary Union. She serves as Vice-President of the information mission on the revision of bioethics laws before joining the special commission on the 2019 law on bioethics.

As a specialist in disability and inclusion, Janvier is the author of an amendment in the PACTE law on the French economy. The amendment's aim is to create a "Handicap" label for the companies most involved in including disabled workers in their human resources and to increase employment's accessibility for disabled citizens.

In July 2019, Janvier published an information report on the European Union's plastics strategy, together with the Les Républicains MP Bernard Deflesselles. Since the end of 2019, she is working as a rapporteur on another European Affairs' information report focusing on the European Neighbourhood Policy, together with the Socialist MP Joaquim Pueyo.

On 14 January 2020, Janvier became her parliamentary group's rapporteur on recreational cannabis in the National Assembly's common information mission on the regulation and impact of the different uses of cannabis.

== Political positions ==
In July 2019, Janvier voted in favor of the French ratification of the European Union’s Comprehensive Economic and Trade Agreement (CETA) with Canada.

In 2020, Janvier was one of ten LREM members who voted against her parliamentary group's majority and opposed a much discussed security bill drafted by her colleagues Alice Thourot and Jean-Michel Fauvergue that helps, among other measures, curtail the filming of police forces.

== See also ==
- 2017 French legislative election
