= Hôtel de Ville, Fleury-les-Aubrais =

Town hall in Fleury-les-Aubrais, France

Hôtel de Ville
- The main frontage of the Hôtel de Ville in August 2026
- Interactive map of the Hôtel de Ville area

General information
- Type: City hall
- Architectural style: Art Deco style
- Location: Fleury-les-Aubrais, France
- Coordinates: 47.9312°N 1.9207°E
- Completed: 1928

Design and construction
- Architect: Constant Coursimault

The Hôtel de Ville (French pronunciation: [otɛl də vil], City Hall) is a municipal building in Fleury-les-Aubrais, Loiret, in north-central France, standing on Place de la République.

== History ==
Following the French Revolution, the new town council of Fleury-aux-Choux initially met in the house of the mayor at the time. This arrangement continued until December 1845 when the council rented two rooms on the west side of Place du Bourg (now Place de la République). The two rooms accommodated the municipal office and a classroom, where teaching was provided by two nuns on a fee-paying basis. In 1881, teaching became free of charge following the implementation of the Jules Ferry laws. The school became known as the École du Bourg and, later, the École Primaire René Ferragu.

In the mid-1920s, following significant population growth, the council led by the mayor, Maurice Jourdain, decided to commission a dedicated town hall. The site they selected was on the east side of Place du Bourg. After some discussion about the size and cost of the proposed building, the council eventually accepted a modest single-storey concept. Construction of the new building started in 1926. It was designed by the departmental architect, Constant Coursimault, in the Art Deco style, built by local contractors in rubble masonry at a cost of some FFr210,000, and was officially opened in the presence of the mayor of Orléans, Théophile Chollet, and the newspaper proprietor, Leon Zay, (father of the politician, Jean Zay) on 15 July 1928. The design involved a symmetrical main frontage of three bays facing west onto the Place du Bourg. The central bay featured a round-headed doorway flanked by ornate corbels supporting a round-headed pediment with the word "Mairie" carved into the tympanum. The outer bays were fenestrated by round-headed windows with moulded surrounds.

A war memorial, in the form of an obelisk carved with a female figure intended to commemorate the lives of local service personnel who died in the First World War, was unveiled on the west side of Place du Bourg in the 1920s. This was later augmented to commemorate the lives of local service personnel who died in the Second World War. Following the liberation of the town by the 3rd United States Army, under Lieutenant General George S. Patton, on 16 August 1944, the town hall was the venue for a major celebrations.

The building was extended to the north in 1961 to accommodate the Bureau du Maire (mayor's parlour). As services expanded, prefabricated office units were established behind the town hall in the 1970s and then replaced by a modern two-story office building in 1992. Internally, the principal room was the Salle du Conseil (council chamber). A new war memorial, in the form of a stele with a plaque intended to commemorate the lives of local service personnel who died in the conflicts in Indochina, Algeria, Lebanon, and Afghanistan, was unveiled in front of the town hall in Place de la République in September 2014. The whole complex was the target of a major cyberattack in June 2024.
