= Saint-Jean-de-la-Ruelle =

- Commune
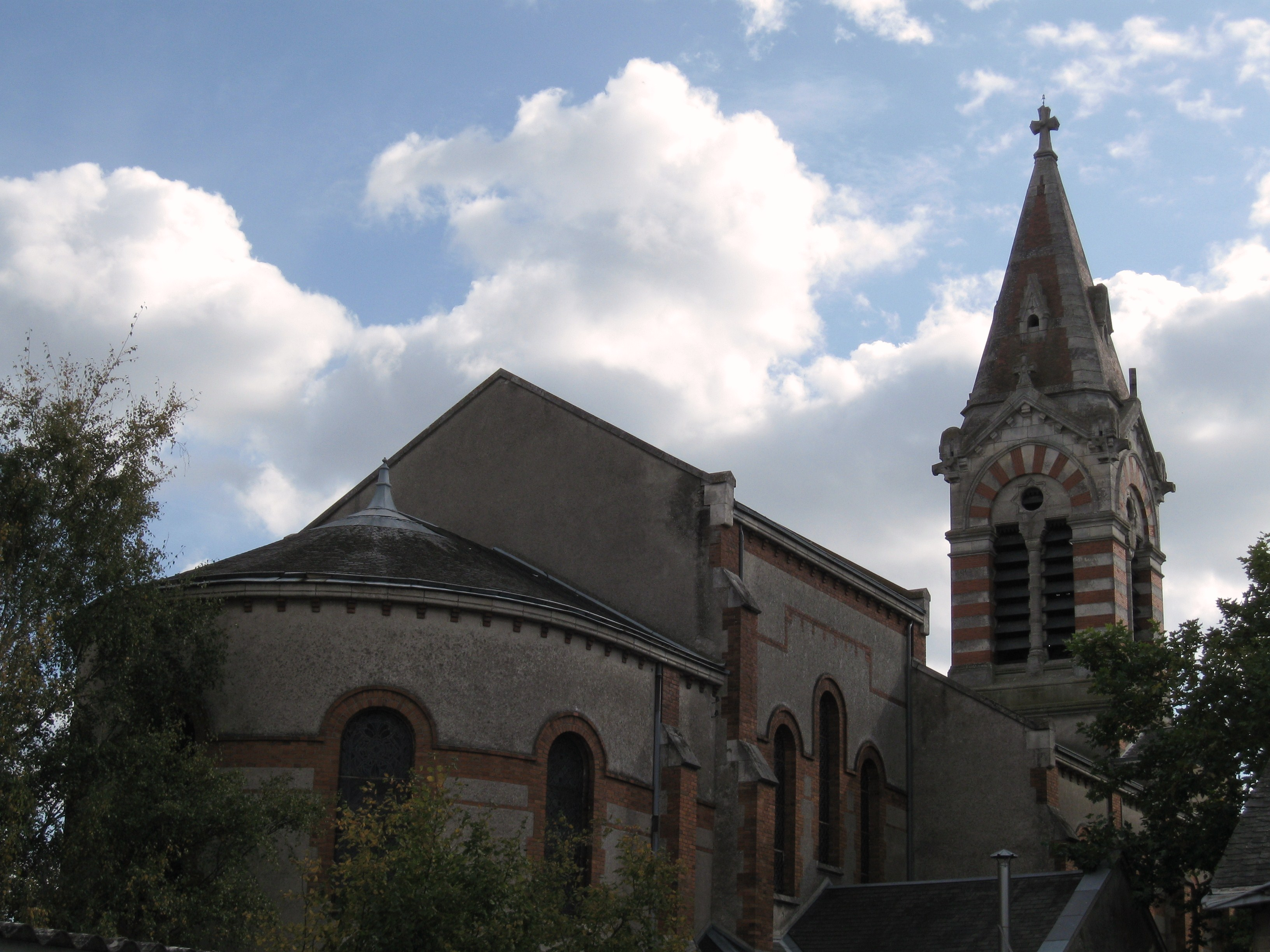
- The church in Saint-Jean-de-la-Ruelle

- Coat of arms
- Location of Saint-Jean-de-la-Ruelle
- Location within France Location within Centre-Val de Loire
- Coordinates: 47°54′50″N 1°52′28″E
- Country: France
- Region: Centre-Val de Loire
- Department: Loiret
- Arrondissement: Orléans
- Canton: Saint-Jean-de-la-Ruelle
- Intercommunality: Orléans Métropole

Government
  - Mayor (2023–2026): Fabien Rivière-Da-Silva
- Area^{1}: 6.06 km^{2} (2.34 sq mi)
- Highest elevation: 121 m (397 ft)
- Lowest elevation: 90 m (300 ft)
- Population (2023): 16,768
  - Density: 2,770/km^{2} (7,170/sq mi)
- Time zone: UTC+01:00 (CET)
  - Summer (DST): UTC+02:00 (CEST)
- INSEE/Postal code: 45285 /45140
- ^{1} French Land Register data, which excludes lakes, ponds, glaciers > 1 km^{2} (0.386 sq mi or 247 acres) and river estuaries.

Saint-Jean-de-la-Ruelle (pronounced [sɛ̃ ʒɑ̃ d(ə) la ʁɥɛl]) is a commune in the Loiret department in the administrative region of Centre-Val de Loire, France.

It is located about 3.5 km (2.2 mi) from Orléans.

== Population ==
Historical population
Year	Pop.	±% p.a.
1968	12,620	—
1975	16,359	+3.78%
1982	17,062	+0.60%
1990	16,335	−0.54%
1999	16,560	+0.15%
2007	16,406	−0.12%
2012	16,833	+0.52%
2017	16,273	−0.67%
2023	16,768	+0.50%
Source: INSEE

== Personalities ==
- Dosseh, rapper and actor

== Twin towns – sister cities ==
Saint-Jean-de-la-Ruelle is twinned with:

- Amposta, Spain
- Gommern, Germany
- Niepołomice, Poland

== See also ==
- Communes of the Loiret department
