= Pierre Perroy =

French politician

Pierre Perroy (11 February 1907 - 19 September 1990) was a French politician. Perroy was born in Fleury-les-Aubrais. He represented the National Centre of Independents and Peasants (CNIP) in the National Assembly from 1956 to 1958.

He is a graduate of HEC Paris and holds a law degree.
