= Georges Cochery =

French politician (1855–1914)

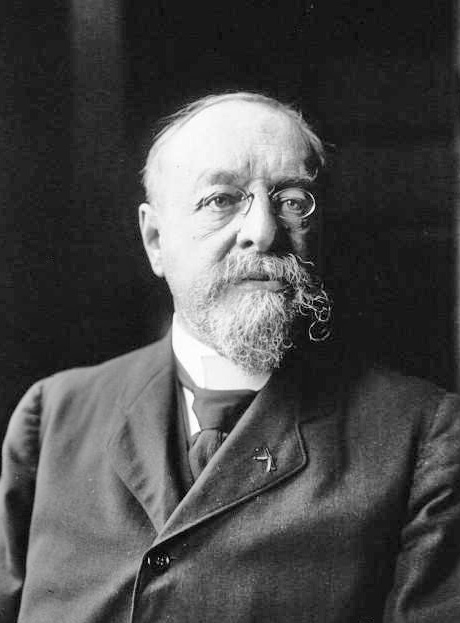
Georges Cochery (1913)

Georges Charles Paul Cochery (20 March 1855 – 10 August 1914) was the son of the French politician Louis-Adolphe Cochery.

Cochery was deputy of his father's département of the Loiret from 1885 until 1914, five times president of the Budget Commission, minister of finance (1895–1898) and vice-president of the chamber (1898–1902), and again finance minister in the Briand Cabinet, 1909.
