= Louis Boyer (politician) =

French physician and politician

- Born: 13 November 1921
- Died: 12 May 2017 (aged 95)
- Occupations: Physician, politician

Louis Boyer (13 November 1921 – 12 May 2017) was a French physician and politician. He served as a member of the French Senate from 1974 to 2001, representing Loiret. He was also the mayor of Gien from 1959 to 1995.

== Biography ==
Louis Boyer was born on November 13, 1921. He is a physician by profession.

He was mayor of Gien, in the Loiret department, between 1959 and 1995 and general councilor for the canton of Gien between 1964 and 1994. He was elected senator for the Loiret on September 22, 1974, and re-elected in 1983 and 1992. He was vice-chairman of the Social Affairs Committee during his terms as senator.

The stadium in the town of Gien has borne his name since June 2014.

He died on May 11, 2017, at the age of 96.
