= Louis Adolphe Cochery =

French politician and journalist (1819–1900)

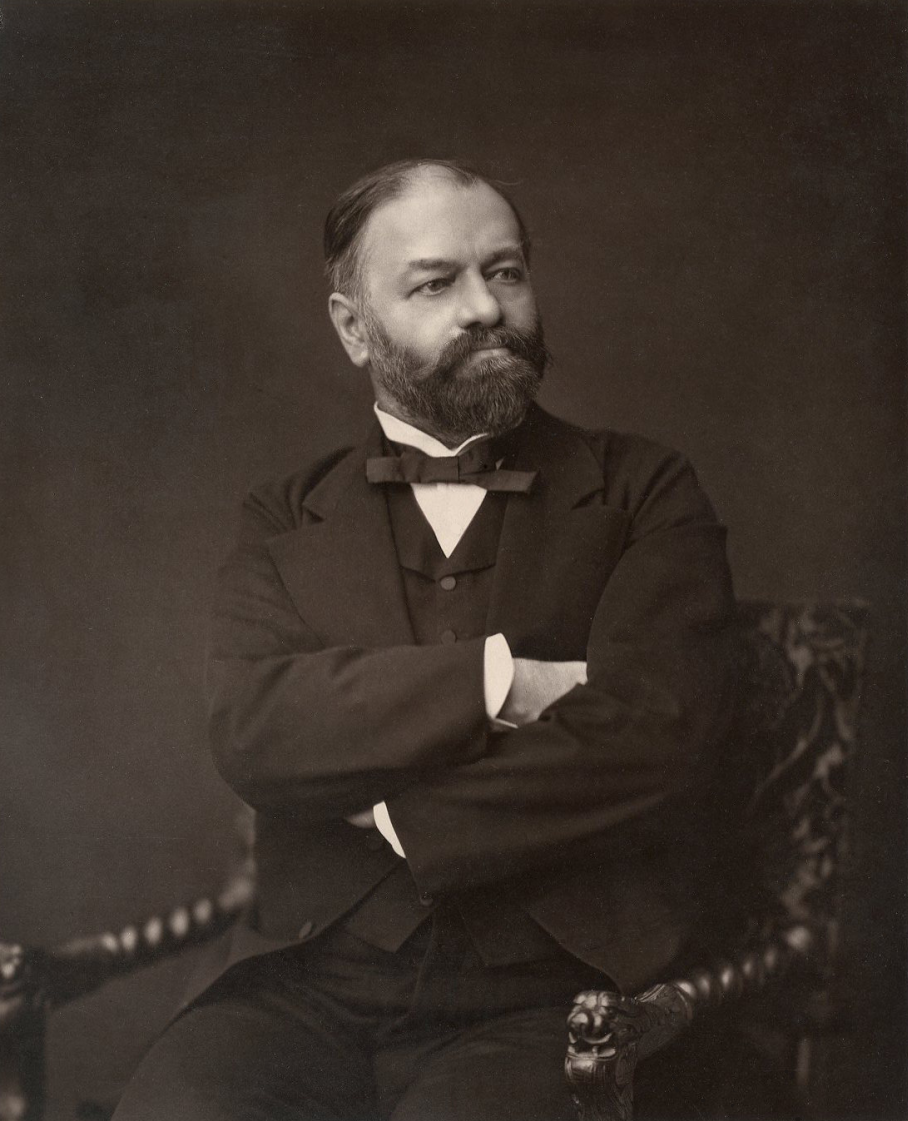
Louis Adolphe Cochery

Louis Adolphe Cochery (26 August 1819 – 13 October 1900) was a French politician and journalist.

== Biography ==
Born in Paris, he studied Law and soon after soon entered politics, joining the staff of the Ministry of Justice after the revolution of February 1848. From the time of Louis-Napoléon Bonaparte's coup of 1851, through the Second French Empire, to May 1869, he devoted himself to journalism (in 1868, he founded the journal Indépendant de Montargis). Then, elected deputy by the department of the Loiret, he joined the group of the Centre-left, and was a supporter of the September 4, 1870 creation of the Third Republic. During the Paris Commune, he was mandated by the Parliament with missions inside the besieged capital, and, although he had been awarded safe-conduct by Adolphe Thiers, he was the subject of a parliamentary investigation.

His talent in finance won him a distinguished voice in the chamber. From 1879 until 1885 he was Minister of Posts and Telegraphs, presiding over the Universal Postal Union Congress in Paris (1878), and founding the École Nationale Supérieure des Télécommunications. In January 1888 he was elected to the Senate.

His son Georges Charles Paul Cochery (1855–1914) was also a politician.
