= Éric Doligé =

French politician

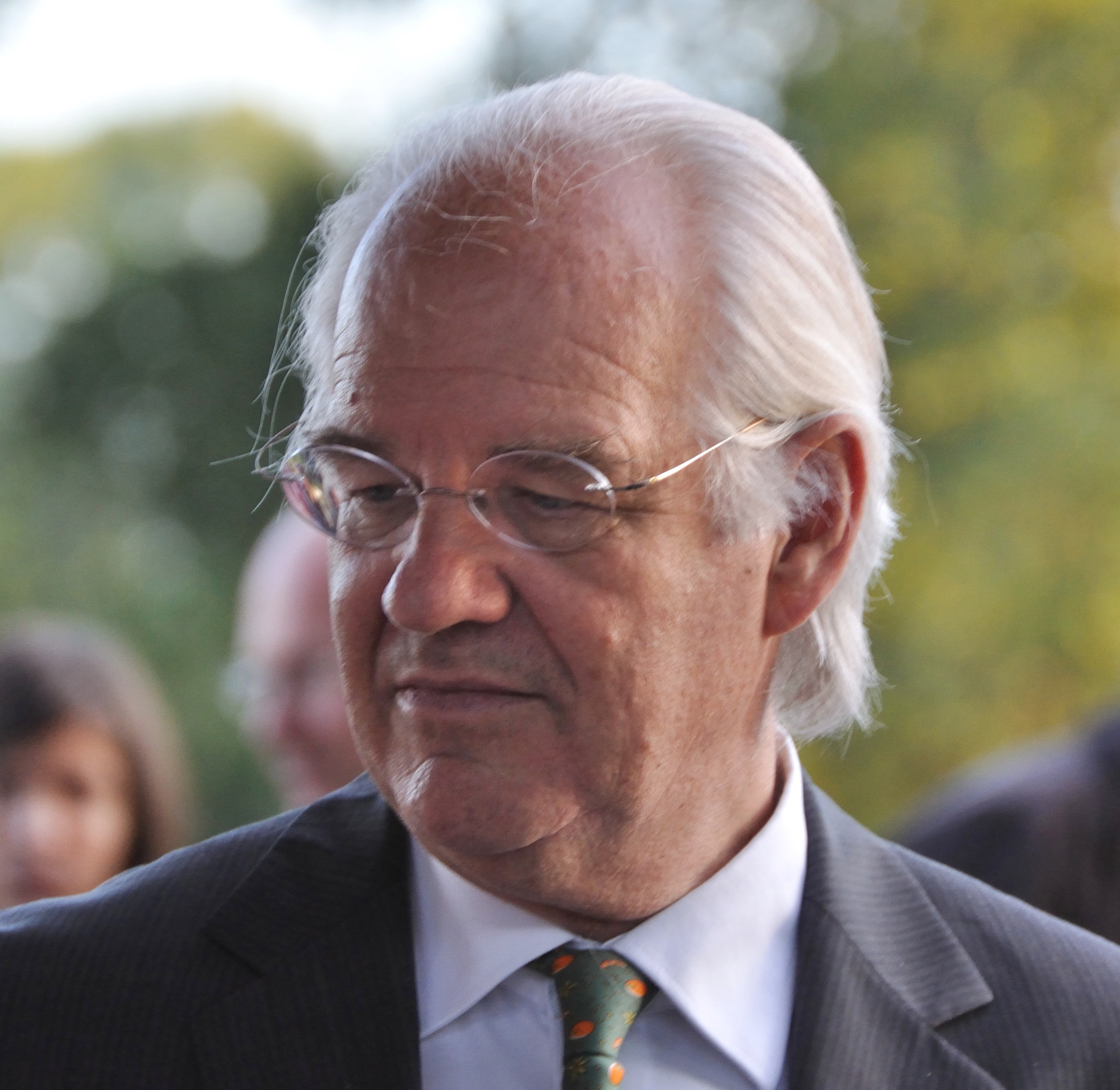

Member of the French Senate for Loiret
- In office 1 October 2001 – 1 October 2017
- Parliamentary group: UMP then LR

Member of the National Assembly for Loiret's 2nd constituency
- In office 1988–2002
- Preceded by: none (proportional representation per Department)
- Succeeded by: Serge Grouard

Personal details
- Born: 25 May 1943 (age 83) Paris, France
- Party: The Republicans
- Education: EDHEC Business School

Éric Doligé (born 25 May 1943 in Paris) is a French politician and former member of the Senate of France. He represented the Loiret department and is a member of The Republicans Party.

== Bibliography ==
- Page on the Senate website
