= 1982 Paris–Dakar Rally =

Off-road motorsport event in France and Africa

← Previous event	Next event →
- Host country: France; Algeria; Mali; Senegal

1982 Dakar Rally also known as the 1982 Paris–Dakar Rally was the 4th running of the Dakar Rally event. 382 competitors took part. The brothers, Claude Marreau and Bernard Marreau, won for the Renault team while Cyril Neveu won the motorcycle category for the Honda team.

== Stages ==
Stage	Date	From	To	Total (km)
1	1 January	(France) Paris	(France) Olivet	
2	2 January	(France) Olivet	(France) Sète	
	3 January	Transportation to Africa		
3	4 January	(Algeria) Algiers	(Algeria) Ouled Djellal	470
4	5 January	(Algeria) Ouled Djellal	(Algeria) Hassi Messaoud	
5	6 January	(Algeria) Hassi Messaoud	(Algeria) Bordj Omar Driss	414
6	7 January	(Algeria) Bordj Omar Driss	(Algeria) Tit	568
7	8 January	(Algeria) Tit	(Algeria) Timeaouine	538
8	9 January	(Algeria) Timeaouine	(Mali) Gao	740
	10 January	Rest day in Gao		
9	11 January	(Mali) Gao	(Mali) Mopti	538
10	12 January	(Mali) Mopti	(Mali) Gao	570
	13 January	Rest day in Gao		
11	14 January	(Mali) Gao	(Mali) Tombouctou	424
12	15 January	(Mali) Tombouctou	(Mali) Niono	558
13	16 January	(Mali) Niono	(Mali) Nioro du Sahel	517
14	17 January	(Mali) Nioro du Sahel	(Senegal) Tambacounda	310
15	18 January	(Senegal) Tambacounda	(Senegal) Dara	306
16	19 January	(Senegal) Dara	(Senegal) Tiougoune	250
17	20 January	(Senegal) Tiougoune	(Senegal) Dakar	100

== Results ==
=== Cars ===
No.	Driver / co-driver	Country	Marque
1	Claude Marreau / Bernard Marreau	France	Renault
2	Jean Claude Briavoine / André Deliaire	France	Lada
3	Jean-Pierre Jaussaud / Michel Brière	France	Mercedes
4	Pierre Lartigue / Patrick Destaillats	France	Range Rover
5	Jacky Ickx / Claude Brasseur	Belgium; France	Mercedes

=== Bikes ===
Pos.	Rider	Country	Marque
1	Cyril Neveu	France	Honda
2	Philippe Vassard	France	Honda
3	Grégoire Verhaegue	France	Barigo
4	Guy Albaret	France	Yamaha
5	Michel Merel	France	Yamaha

=== Trucks ===
Pos.	Driver co-drivers	Country	Marque
1	Georges Groine / Thierry de Saulieu / Bernard Malferiol	France	Mercedes
2	Pierre Laleu / Bernard Langlois	France	Mercedes
3	Jan de Rooy / Gérard Straetmans	Netherlands	DAF
4	Claude Hervé / Jean-Claude Garcia	France	Acmat
5	Etienne Martinez / Jean-Paul Oligo	France	Mercedes
