= Jean-Louis Riguet =

French writer (1947–2025)

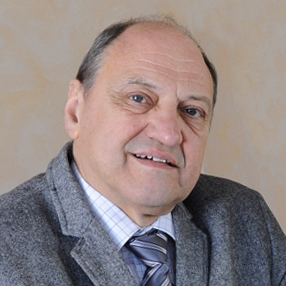
- Riguet in 2015
- Born: 25 March 1947; Mirebeau, France
- Died: 7 August 2025 (aged 78); Orléans, France
- Education: Diplôme national du brevet
- Occupation: Writer

Jean-Louis Riguet (French: [ʒɑ̃ lwi ʁigɛ]; 25 March 1947 – 7 August 2025) was a French writer.

== Life and career ==
Born in Mirebeau on 25 March 1947, Riguet was the son of tailor Louis Riguet and seamstress Emma Robert. He obtained his Diplôme national du brevet and began working at a notary office. He then began teaching at the Centre de formation professionnelle des notaires in Paris. He began publishing poetry and essays in 2012, after his retirement from teaching. During this time, he lived in Saint-Hilaire-Saint-Mesmin. A member of the Société des gens de lettres, he started the blog librebonimenteur.net.

His work L’association des bouts de lignes won him the Prix Scriborom in 2013. His historical novel Aristide, la butte meurtrie (Vauquois 1914–1918) received the Prix Roman Terroir at the Salon international du livre de Mazamet in 2015. He received the same prize again in 2018 with Récits historiques des quais d'Orléans. Some of his poems were published in literary magazines in 2018, 2020, and 2023. In 2025, he was a member of the jury of the Concours de nouvelles, organized by Éditions Anagnorisis.

Riguet died in Orléans on 7 August 2025, at the age of 78.

== Works ==
- Augustin, ma bataille de Loigny (2012)
- L’association des bouts de lignes (2013)
- Le tambour héroïque, Le passant, Le grand canyon, Les plumes et L’Ondine et la Sylphide (2013)
- La vie en archives d’un petit gars (2014)
- Aristide, la butte meurtrie (Vauquois 1914–1918) (2014)
- Délire très mince (2014)
- André dans le tumulte de 39-45 (2015)
- Lettre aux attenteurs (2015)
- Récits historiques de l'Orléanais (2016)
- Le dénouement des jumeaux : bataille de Coulmiers 1870 (2016)
- Pétales éclectiques (2016)
- Coquecigrues par mégarde (2017)
- Récits historiques des quais d'Orléans (2017)
- Éliminations pour un héritage (2017)
- Ondes intimes (2018)
- Les acrostiches en liberté (2018)
- Le château du Rondon d'Olivet raconte son histoire de France (2018)
- Certitudes indécises (2019)
- Le baron de la disette (2019)
- Le bâtard de la folie (2020)
- Vies cabossées (2021)
- Ainsi va la vie (2022)
- Touches en noir et blanc (2022)
- Deux campagnes de Loire : Patay en Beauce 1429–1870 (2022)
- Le cauchemar de Chloé (2023)
- Les aventures de Priscillien 1 - La cabane (2023)
- Les aventures de Priscillien 2 - La butte (2023)
- Automne 1870 en Beauce : des familles en souffrance (2023)
- Bricemaël et la Butte des Élus (2024)
