= Jacky Ickx =

Belgian racing driver (born 1945)

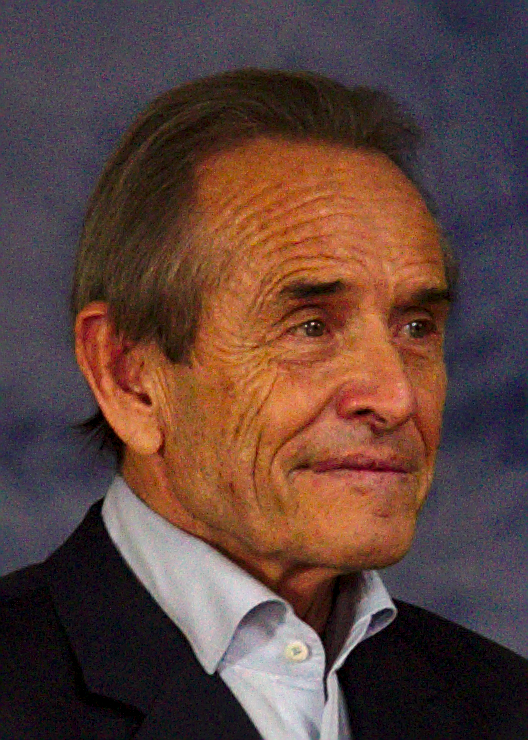
- Ickx in 2018
- Born: Jacques Bernard Edmon Martin Henri Ickx; 1 January 1945 (age 81); Brussels, Belgium
- Spouses: Catherine Blaton (m. 1970; div. 1980): Maroussia Janssens; Khadja Nin (m. 2006)
- Children: 5, including Vanina
- Relatives: Pascal Ickx (brother)

Formula One World Championship career
- Nationality: (Belgium) Belgian
- Active years: 1966–1979
- Team(s): Tyrrell, Cooper, Ferrari, Brabham, McLaren, Frank Williams, Lotus, Wolf–Williams, Ensign, Ligier
- Entries: 122 (116 starts)
- Championships: 0
- Wins: 8
- Podiums: 25
- Career points: 181
- Pole positions: 13
- Fastest laps: 14
- First entry: 1966 German Grand Prix
- First win: 1968 French Grand Prix
- Last win: 1972 German Grand Prix
- Last entry: 1979 United States Grand Prix

World Sportscar Championship career
- Years active: 1966–1979, 1982–1985
- Teams: Francorchamps, Ford, Ferrari, Alfa Romeo, Ligier, BMW, Kauhsen, Gulf, Martini, Porsche
- Starts: 124
- Championships: 2 (1982, 1983) (Note: The World Endurance Championship for Drivers was only held from 1981 onwards.)
- Wins: 39
- Podiums: 71
- Poles: 23
- Fastest laps: 22

24 Hours of Le Mans career
- Years: 1966–1967, 1969–1970, 1973, 1975–1983, 1985
- Teams: Ford, Ferrari, Gulf, Porsche, Martini
- Best finish: 1st (1969, 1975, 1976, 1977, 1981, 1982)
- Class wins: 6 (1969, 1975, 1976, 1977, 1981, 1982)

Jacques Bernard Edmon Martin Henri "Jacky" Ickx (French pronunciation: [ʒaki iks]; born 1 January 1945) is a Belgian former racing driver, who competed in Formula One from 1966 to 1979. Ickx twice finished runner-up in the Formula One World Drivers' Championship in 1969 and 1970, and won eight Grands Prix across 14 seasons. In endurance racing, Ickx won two World Endurance Championships with Porsche and is a six-time winner of the 24 Hours of Le Mans, as well as a two-time winner of the 12 Hours of Sebring. In rallying, Ickx won the Paris–Dakar Rally in 1983 with Mercedes.

Born and raised in Brussels, Ickx started his career in motorcycle road racing and trials, winning several national and continental titles in the latter discipline. Progressing to touring car racing in the mid-1960s, Ickx won multiple titles before winning the 24 Hours of Spa in 1966. Attracting the attention of Ken Tyrrell, he entered the 1966 German Grand Prix in a Matra Formula Two car, retiring after a first-lap collision with John Taylor, who later died of his injuries. Ickx returned to the race the following year, qualifying third in his Formula Two machinery and earning a Formula One drive with Cooper from the Italian Grand Prix onwards, where he finished sixth. Ickx was signed by Ferrari in 1968, taking his maiden victory in France, amongst several podiums, as he finished fourth in the standings.

Moving to Brabham in 1969, Ickx continued to race and finished runner-up to Jackie Stewart. He returned to Ferrari the next year, again finishing runner-up to Jochen Rindt as he took wins in Austria, Canada and Mexico. Ickx took further wins for Ferrari at the Dutch Grand Prix in 1971 and the German Grand Prix in 1972, but left the team halfway through the 1973 season over the performance of the Ferrari 312B3. After one-off appearances for McLaren and Williams, Ickx joined Lotus in 1974, but left after less than two seasons with the team. He returned to the sport with Wolf–Williams in 1976, swapping seats with Chris Amon at Ensign from the Dutch Grand Prix onwards. After intermittent appearances for Ensign over the next three seasons, Ickx joined Ligier in 1979, replacing an injured Patrick Depailler at the final eight Grands Prix of the season. Struggling to adapt to the ground effect era, Ickx retired from Formula One at the conclusion of the 1979 season with eight race wins, 13 pole positions, 14 fastest laps and 25 podiums.

Outside of Formula One, Ickx won the 24 Hours of Le Mans six times, a record which stood until 2005. He also won the 12 Hours of Sebring in 1969 and 1972, and the 24 Hours of Daytona in 1972 alongside Mario Andretti, (Note: The 24 Hours of Daytona was held as the 6 Hours of Daytona in 1972.) making him the fifth driver to complete the Triple Crown of endurance racing. Ickx won two World Endurance Championships in 1982 and 1983 with Porsche. He retired from endurance racing in 1985, following his involvement in the death of Stefan Bellof. Between 1981 and 2000, Ickx entered 14 editions of the Dakar Rally, winning in 1983. Ickx was inducted into the International Motorsports Hall of Fame in 2002.

Noted for his skill in rain and on challenging tracks such as the Nürburgring, Ickx is described as one of the most adaptable racing drivers of all time due to his success across a wide range of categories.

== Early life and career ==
Jacques Bernard Edmon Martin Henri Ickx was born on 1 January 1945 in Brussels. He was introduced to motorsports when he was taken by his father, motoring journalist Jacques Ickx, to races which he covered. Despite this family background, Ickx had limited interest in the sport until his father bought him a 50 cc Zündapp motorcycle.

Ickx began to compete in road racing and motorcycle trials. He won the 50 cc class at the 1962 Mettet Grand Prix road race, then demonstrated impressive talent when he defeated future motocross world champion Roger De Coster in the 1963 Belgian 50 cc trials national championship. Soon afterwards, Ickx won 8 of 13 races at the first season and the European 50 cc trials title.

Ickx took another two titles before he moved to racing a Lotus Cortina in touring car racing, taking his national saloon car championship in 1965, as well as winning the Spa 24 Hours race in 1966 driving a BMW 2000TI. He also competed in sports car races where he had already significant experience from taking part in the 1000 km races at the Nürburgring.

== Formula One career ==
=== Debut and early career (1966–1967) ===
Ickx entered his first Grand Prix at the Nürburgring in 1966, driving a Matra MS5-Cosworth one-litre Formula Two (F2) car, entered by Ken Tyrrell. However, a first lap collision with John Taylor at Flugplatz caused both cars to retire and Taylor later died as a result of burns received in the accident, after his car caught fire. In 1967, Ickx again drove at the Nurburgring, with an F2 Matra MS7-Cosworth 1.6-litre, also entered by Tyrrell. Despite the greater power of the Formula One cars, only two drivers qualified with a faster time than Ickx: Denny Hulme and Jim Clark. As Ickx was racing in the separate F2 class, he started the race behind all of the Formula One cars, but within four laps of the 28 km circuit he was up to fifth place, having overtaken 12 Formula One cars. He was forced to retire after 12 laps with a broken front suspension, but set the fastest lap of the F2 runners.

At Monza in 1967, Ickx made his Formula One debut in a Cooper T81B-Maserati, finishing sixth, despite suffering a puncture on the last lap. He also drove for Cooper in the United States Grand Prix at Watkins Glen but retired on lap 45 with overheating.

=== Ferrari (1968) ===
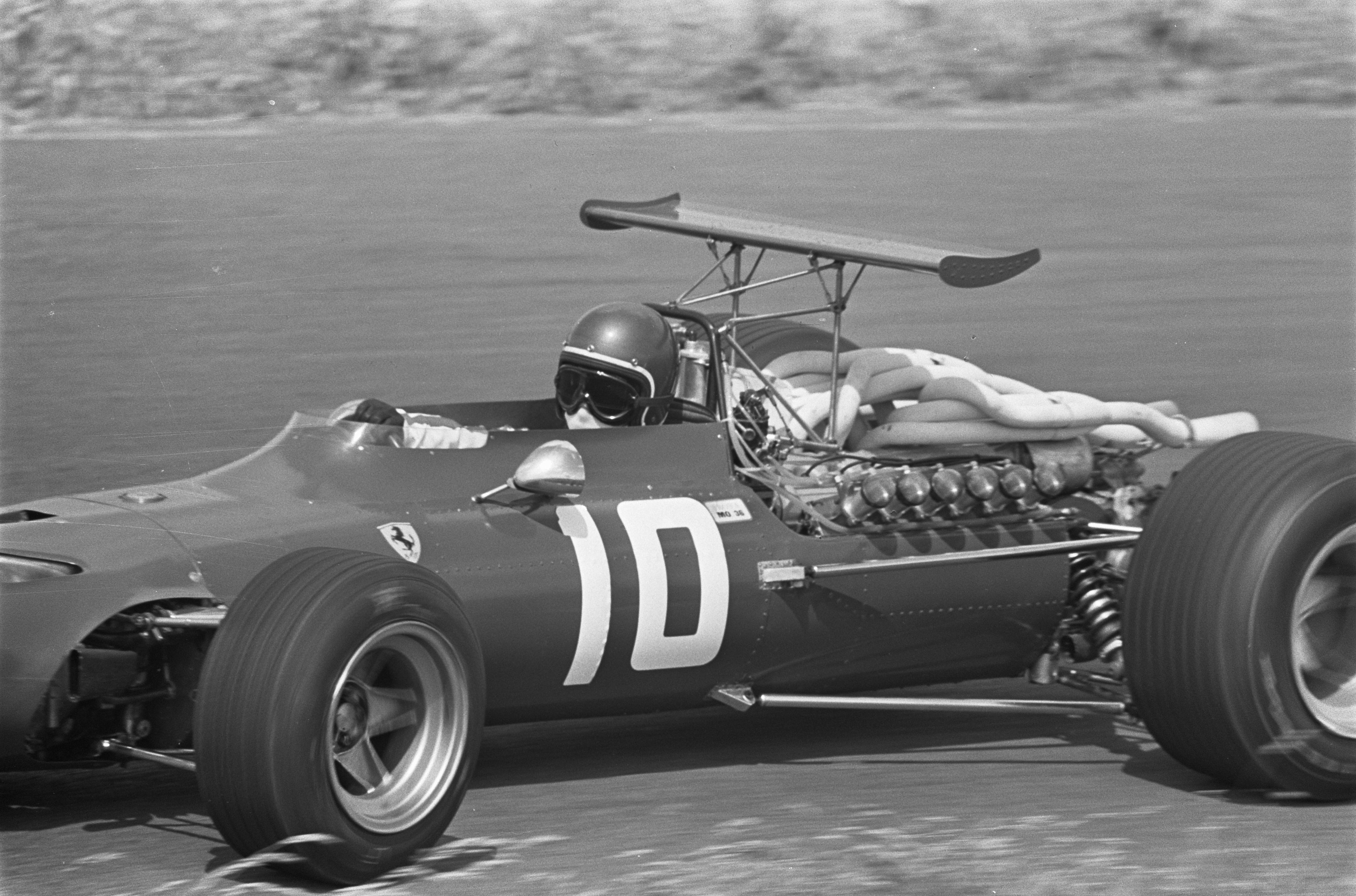
Ickx at the 1968 Dutch Grand Prix.

In 1968, Ickx drove in Formula 1 for Ferrari. He retired from his first two races, but at his home race at Spa-Francorchamps he started from the front row and finished third. In the French Grand Prix at Rouen, he took his first win, in heavy rain. Ickx also finished third at Brands Hatch and fourth at the Nürburgring after driving almost the entire race in heavy rain without his helmet visor. At Monza, he finished the race in third position. In Canada, he crashed and broke his left leg during practice, thus did not start and also missed the subsequent United States Grand Prix. He returned in time for the final race of the season in Mexico. Ickx scored 27 points in the 1968 Formula One season finishing in fourth place behind Graham Hill, Jackie Stewart and Hulme.

=== Brabham (1969) ===
In 1969, Ickx moved to Brabham, partly at the instigation of the John Wyer team for whom he'd had considerable success in sports cars. Wyer's main sponsor, Gulf Oil were keen to ensure that they retained his services rather than possibly lose him to Ferrari's sports car team. His first results at Brabham were poor, but after Jack Brabham broke his foot in a testing accident, Ickx's results improved: Alan Henry suggests that Ickx performed better with the whole team focussed on him. Ickx finished third in France, second in Great Britain and won in Canada and in Germany at the Nürburgring, where he also took pole position and fastest lap, in the last Formula One race there before 'The Ring' was made less bumpy and dangerous. In the 1969 Mexican Grand Prix Ickx finished second and ended the year as runner-up in the drivers' world championship, behind Stewart. He returned to the Ferrari team for the 1970 season, a move he had been considering since the Italian Grand Prix.

=== Return to Ferrari (1970–1973) ===
As in 1969, Ickx had a disappointing start to the 1970 season. On the first lap of the Spanish Grand Prix he collided with the BRM of Jackie Oliver and his car caught fire. It took at least 20 seconds for him to leave the burning car and he was hospitalized with severe burns. After 17 days, he was back in his car at the Monaco Grand Prix, where he ran fifth before retiring with a driveshaft failure. The car started to improve and at the German Grand Prix (held at Hockenheim as his favourite Nürburgring was boycotted for safety reasons) he fought with Jochen Rindt for the win, but finished a close second. At the Austrian Grand Prix it was Ickx that took the win. At Monza, Rindt died in an accident during qualifying. Ickx was the only driver with a chance to take the championship from Rindt who had already won five of nine races in that season, with four more to go. Monza saw a win by Ferrari teammate Clay Regazzoni while Ickx's car broke down. Ickx took the win at Canada and if he could win at the remaining two events, he would overtake Rindt and win the championship. However, in the US Grand Prix at Watkins Glen he only finished fourth, with Rindt's replacement Emerson Fittipaldi scoring his first career win, and thus was mathematically eliminated from the championship chase. Despite winning the last race in Mexico, Ickx could not beat Rindt's points total. Ickx later stated in a 2011 article in the British magazine Motor Sport that he was glad he did not win the 1970 World Championship. He did not want to win against a man who could not defend his chances, referring to the deceased Rindt.

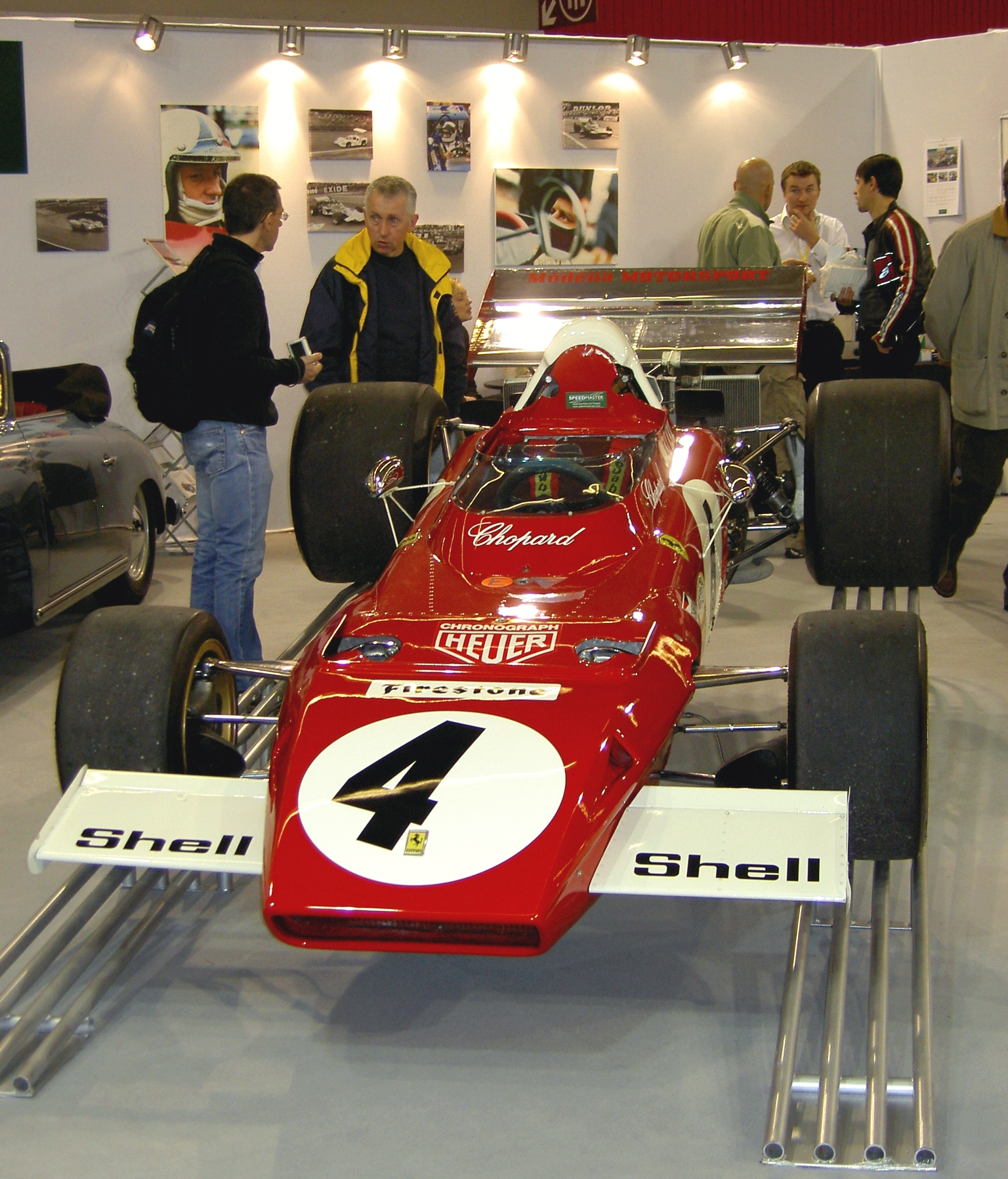
Jacky Ickx's Ferrari 312B2 (1971/72)

In 1971, Ickx and Ferrari started as favourites, but the championship went to Jackie Stewart with the new Tyrrell. Ferrari traditionally started the season with its full attention on the sports car championship rather than Formula One, a fact that had already caused John Surtees to leave in the middle of the 1966 season. Ickx won at Zandvoort in the rain with Firestone wet tyres, while Stewart had no chance with his Goodyear rubber. After that, he had a lot of retirements, while Stewart took one win after the other, despite Ickx giving him a good challenge at the Nürburgring once again, where both drivers shared victories from 1968 to 1973. That long and very challenging track was the favourite of Ickx, while Stewart had called it the 'Green Hell' as well as being a driving force behind the driver boycott of 1970 that urged the Germans to rework the layout of the track, which had been built in 1927. Stewart said the only thing that had changed since then were the trees growing bigger. As requested, those near the track were cut and replaced with a small run-off area, and armco. So, the Scot and the Belgian not only fought on the track, but also off the track. Stewart was constantly fighting for more safety in Formula One, while Ickx thought by doing that the challenge was taken out of the sport.

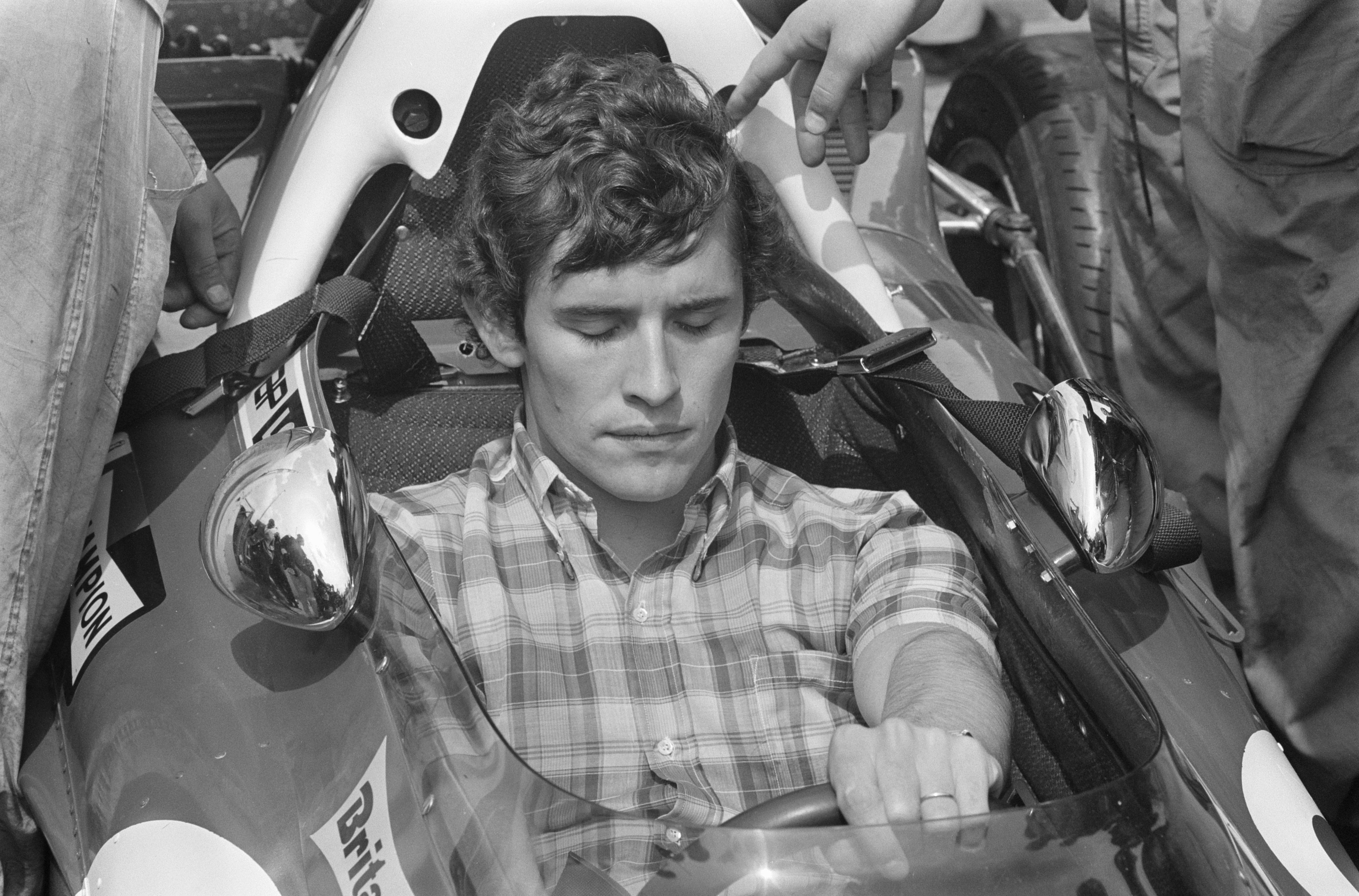
Ickx in his Ferrari at the 1971 Dutch Grand Prix

In 1972, Ickx stayed at Ferrari and finished second in Spain and Monaco. After that the Ferrari only got noticed for its retirements. Yet, once again it was the Nürburgring where Ickx was eager to show it was his track, giving his great rival Stewart no chance at all. As for Stewart one year later, and other champions such as Juan Manuel Fangio in 1957, it turned out that the last Formula One win for Ickx came at Nürburgring, where superior driving skill could beat superior machinery.

In 1973, the Ferrari 312B3 was no longer competitive, and Ickx only managed one fourth place at the opening Grand Prix of the season. While being successful with their sports cars, which were driven to several wins by Ickx himself, the Formula One programme of the Italians was outclassed, and they even had to skip some races, notably at the Nürburgring. This was not acceptable to Ickx, who left the team halfway through the season (after the 1973 British Grand Prix, where he finished eighth). Instead, he competed in the German Grand Prix at the Nürburgring in a McLaren, and scored a sterling third place behind the all-conquering Tyrrells of Stewart and François Cevert. Ickx returned to Ferrari for the Italian Grand Prix at Monza again finishing eighth but drove for Williams in the 1973 United States Grand Prix at Watkins Glen finishing seventh.

=== Lotus (1974–1975) ===
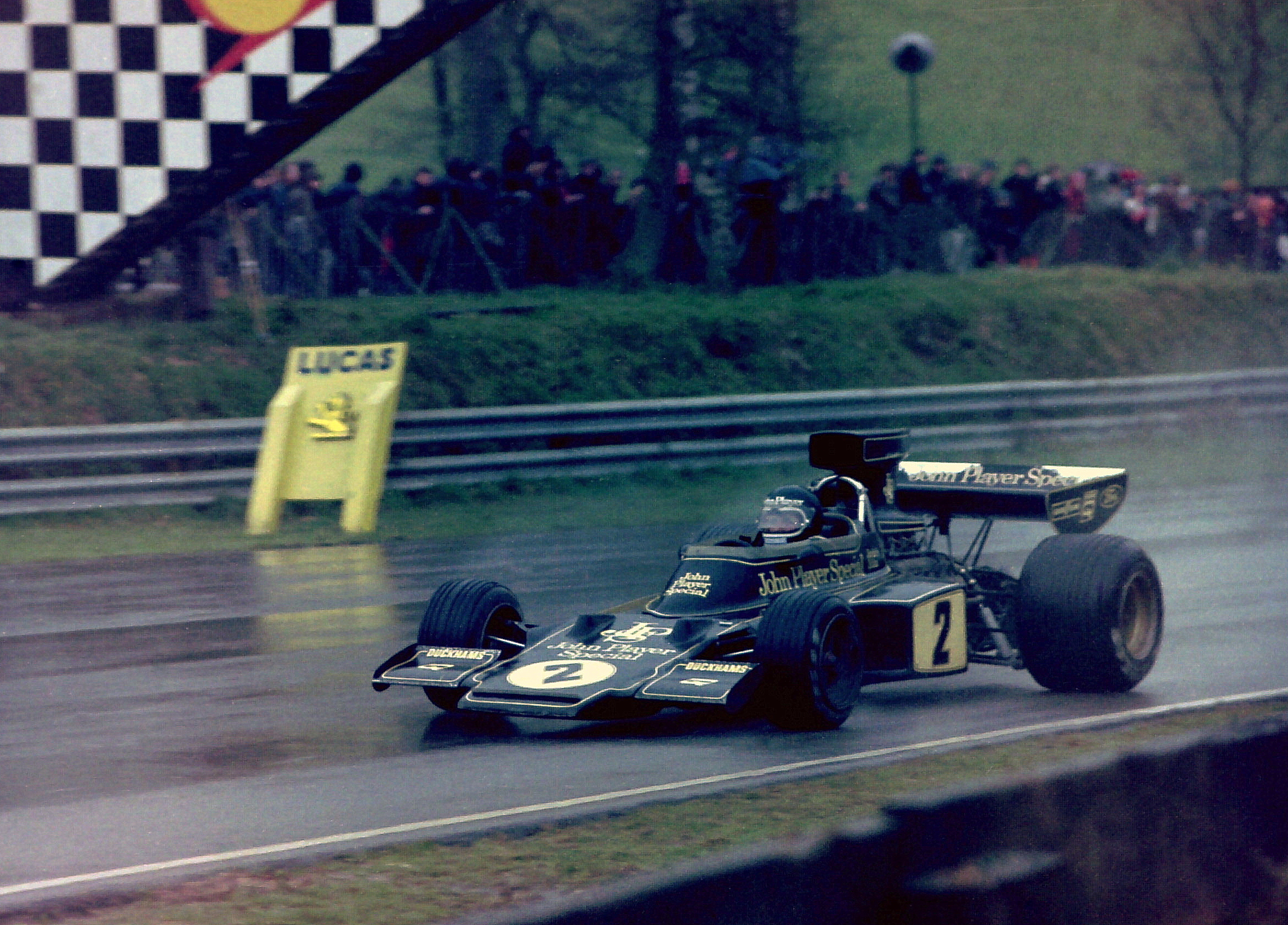
Ickx at the 1974 Race of Champions

When Ickx signed with Team Lotus in 1974, a difficult period awaited. Lotus had problems replacing the successful but ageing Lotus 72 (which debuted in 1970) with the troublesome Lotus 76 and, during the opening races of the championship, Ickx only managed a solitary third place in Brazil. Ickx demonstrated that he was still the Rain Master when he won the non-championship Race of Champions at Brands Hatch after having passed Niki Lauda on the outside at Paddock Bend. After the Brazilian Grand Prix his season deteriorated, the Lotus-Ford retiring in five consecutive races until an eleventh-place finish at Zandvoort. However, in mid season Ickx recovered some form, rising through the field in the British Grand Prix to finish a strong third. Even better was his drive in the German Grand Prix. For most of the race Ickx dueled for fourth place with his teammate Ronnie Peterson who was using a Lotus 76, which had been grafted to the back end of a Lotus 72, Mike Hailwood in a McLaren M23 and Jochen Mass in a Surtees running on his home circuit on Firestone tyres well suited to the circuit. It was a classic duel on the daunting circuit, which still lacked armco around half the track in 1974. Two laps from the end Hailwood crashed badly ending his World Championship career. On the last two laps Ickx was getting close to third place Carlos Reutemann, but on the final lap, Ronnie Peterson slipstreamed past to claim fourth. In Austria, Ickx, this time in the Lotus 76, moved up the field but went off while attempting to take Depailler for second. In the last races of the year, tyre issues with Goodyears unsuitable for the Lotus 72 and 76 meant Lotus were not competitive.

1975 was even more disastrous for Lotus and Ickx left the team halfway through the season, even though he managed a second place in the chaotic Spanish Grand Prix which was overshadowed by accidents and stopped before half distance. Ickx was generally qualifying about 0.8 seconds slower than teammate Peterson. Ickx was stood down after the 1975 French GP with the promise that Chapman might re-employ him when a competitive new Lotus was ready to race. Ickx did not compete in Formula One for the remainder of 1975.

=== Later career (1976–1979) ===
It seemed that the end of Ickx's career was near. After Fittipaldi left McLaren, Ickx was at the "top of the list." However, James Hunt got the drive, allegedly because McLaren's chief sponsor John Hogan had known Hunt for many years. (After Hunt's death, Hogan claimed that he preferred Ickx but McLaren leadership wanted Hunt.) In 1976 Ickx began the season with Wolf–Williams Racing (then entering as "Frank Williams Racing Cars"), but after three races signed with the new team of Walter Wolf Racing, which had substantial financial backing from Wolf. The Wolf team were also running the Wolf–Williams FW05 which was essentially a rebadged Hesketh 308C from 1975 and was uncompetitive. However, at the Race of Champions, Ickx was challenging Hunt and Alan Jones for the lead, when Ickx's visor ripped off. In the world championship races he failed to qualify on four occasions, (a first in his career) achieving a degree of respectability only with a seventh in Spain and a good drive to tenth out of 19 finishers in the French GP in a car which, in the estimate of James Hunt and Chris Amon, was worse than useless. Nevertheless, for a large payment from Wolf, Amon agreed to swap drives with Ickx and Ickx raced the rest of the season in the fast and fragile Lotus styled Ensign N176, in which design Amon had suffered horrific breakages at Zolder and in the Swedish GP. For most of the Dutch GP, Ickx moved through the field, running the third fastest lap and on most laps was the fastest car in the race. With a newer Cosworth engine, Ickx probably would have won, but the under-maintained engine expired ten laps from the end. In the Italian race, Ickx drove at competitive pace in a Grand Prix for the last time, when he finished tenth, only 30 seconds behind winner Ronnie Peterson, hard on the tail of Carlos Reutemann in a works Ferrari 312T2 in ninth. After a bad crash at the United States Grand Prix at Watkins Glen which he was lucky to have survived with only ankle injuries, Ickx only competed sporadically. In 1977, Ickx competed in only one Grand Prix at Monaco for Ensign finishing tenth. In 1978 he entered four Grands Prix, again for Ensign but only achieved a twelfth place at Zolder. In the Swedish Grand Prix at Anderstorp, Ickx failed to qualify.

In 1979, Ickx ended his career as a Grand Prix driver at Ligier, standing in for the injured Patrick Depailler, gaining a fifth and sixth, but finding the ground effect cars dangerous and disconcerting, ill-suited to his precise style. Outside of Formula One, Ickx continued to win races in various sports car series, which he had decided to concentrate on exclusively.

== Endurance racing career ==
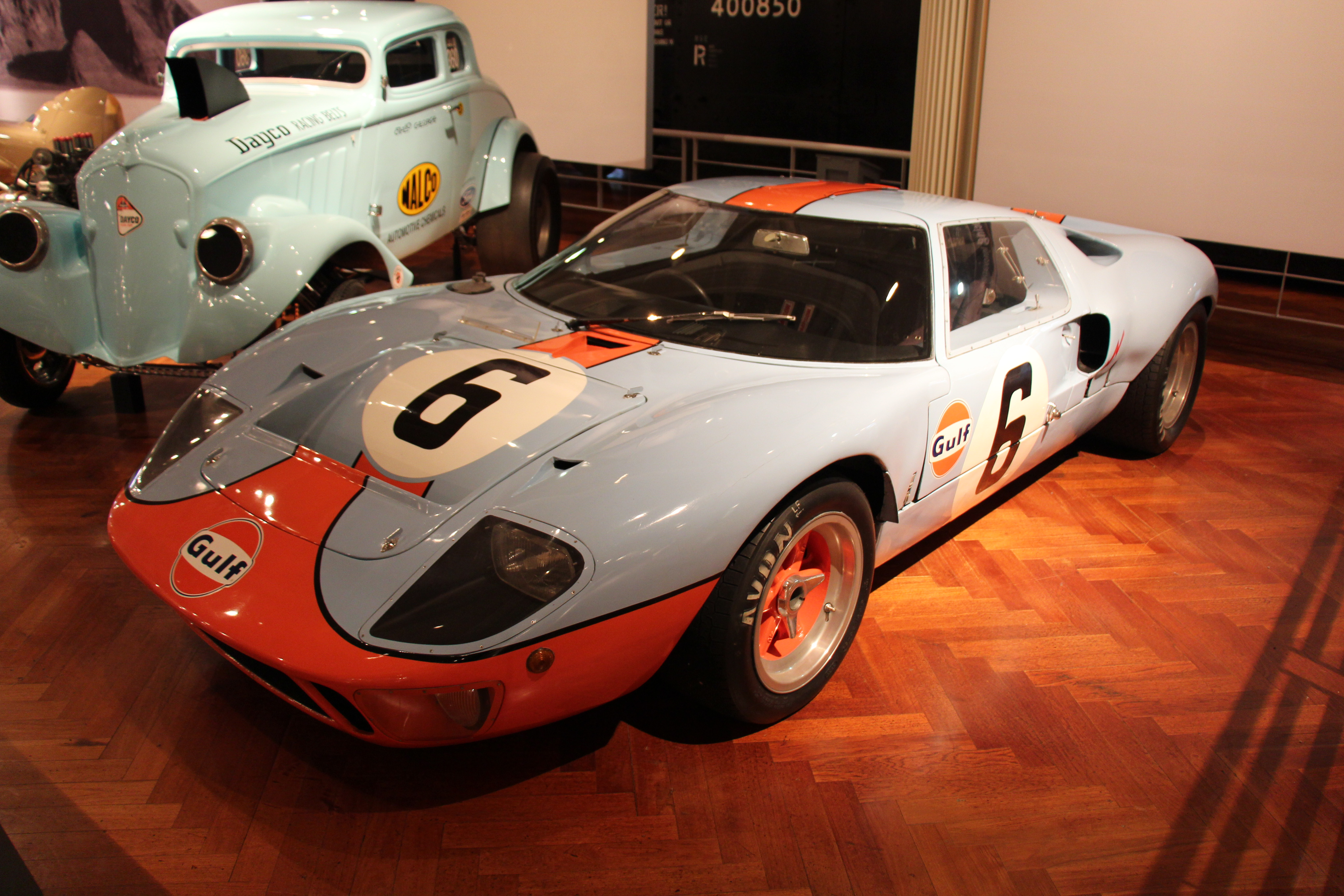
Ickx's Ford GT40, winner of the 1969 24 Hours of Le Mans

In 1966, Ickx teamed up with Hubert Hahne in a BMW 2000TI to win the Spa 24 Hours endurance race in his native Belgium. In 1967, Ickx won the 1000km of Spa with Dick Thompson in the Gulf-liveried JW Automotive Mirage M1. In 1968, Ickx won the Brands Hatch six-hour endurance race partnered with Brian Redman in a John Wyer entered Ford GT40 Mk1. Ickx would go on to win the Brands race on a further three occasions, in 1972 for Ferrari alongside Mario Andretti and 1977 and 1982 driving Porsches with Jochen Mass and Derek Bell respectively.

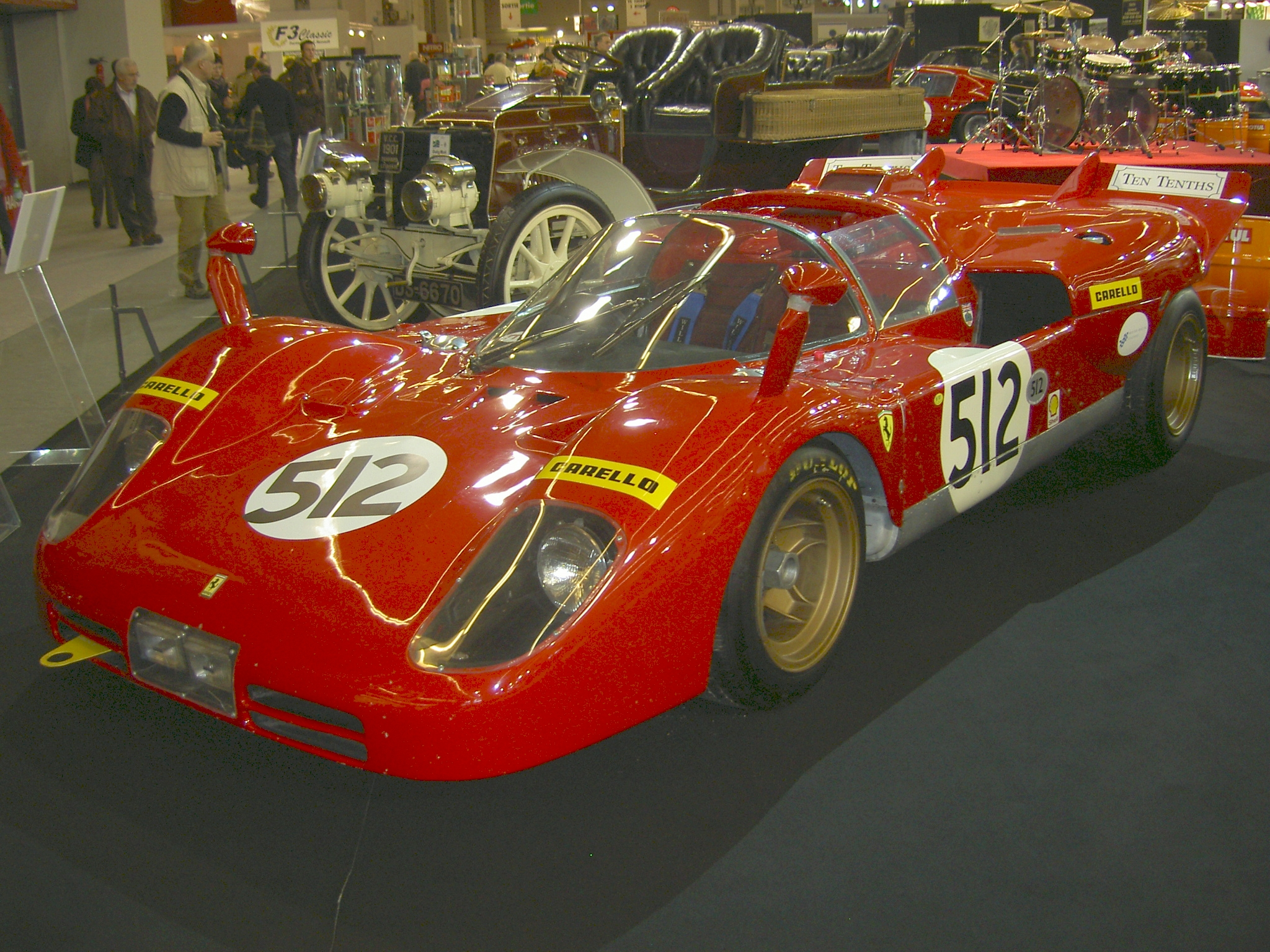
Ferrari 512S: Ickx drove this model during the 1970 24 Hours of Le Mans.

Ickx won the 1969 24 Hours of Le Mans, his first victory in that race. This race also saw the first appearance of the Porsche 917 at Le Mans, which was regarded by far as the favourite. The Ford GT40 that Ickx drove with Jackie Oliver appeared at that time to be an obsolete car, outperformed by the new Porsche 917 but also by the older Porsche 908 and the new generation of 3-litre prototypes from Ferrari, Matra and Alfa Romeo.

As Ickx was opposed to the traditional Le Mans start which he considered to be dangerous, he slowly walked across the track to his machine, instead of running. He locked the safety belt carefully and thus was the last to start the race, chasing the field. On lap one, private driver John Woolfe, who had not taken time to belt himself in, had a fatal accident in his new and powerful 917.

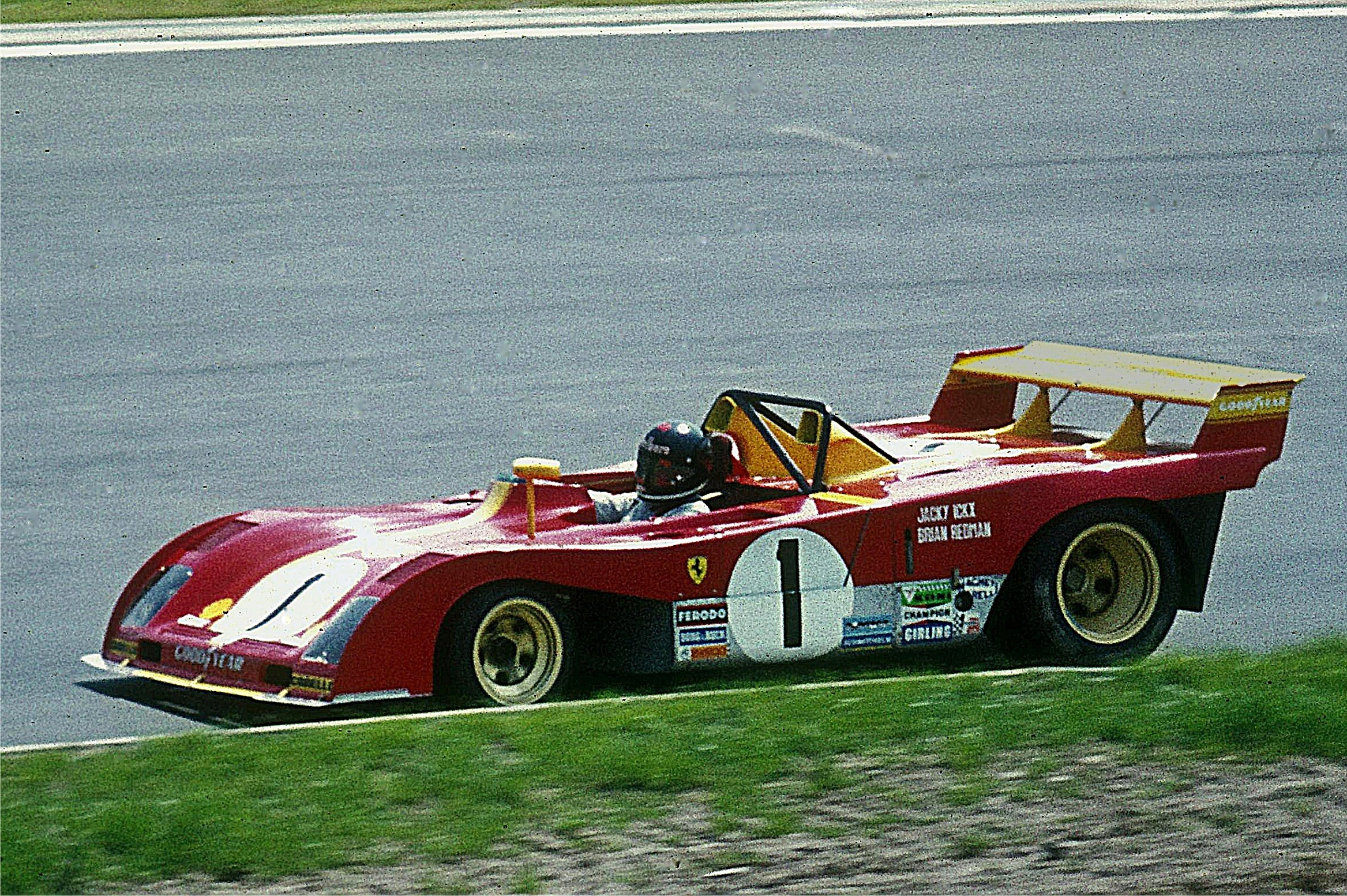
Ickx driving a Ferrari 312PB at the Nürburgring in 1973

During the race the Porsche 917 cars proved unreliable, and none finished. The last four hours of the race turned into a duel between the Porsche 908 of Hans Herrmann/Gérard Larrousse and the Ford GT-40 of Ickx/Oliver. In the last hour, Ickx and Herrmann continually leapfrogged each other, the Porsche being faster on the straights owing to having less aerodynamic drag, while being passed again under braking as the brake pads were worn and the team reckoned there was not enough time left to change them. Ickx won the race by the smallest of competitive margins ever, with less than 120 yards (110 m) between the two cars, despite having lost a bigger distance intentionally at the start. He also won his case for safety: from 1970, all drivers could start the race sitting in their cars with the belts tightened properly.

In later years, Ickx won a record six times at the 24h race at Le Mans, becoming known as "Monsieur Le Mans". Three of the wins were with Derek Bell: this would become one of the most legendary partnerships. In 2005, Tom Kristensen surpassed Ickx's record and when Kristensen announced his proposed retirement at the end of the 2014 season had nine victories.

Ickx driving an Alfa Romeo 33TT12 at Monza in 1974

From 1976 on, Ickx was a factory driver for Porsche and their new turbocharged race cars, the 935 and especially the 936 sports car, which he drove to wins in Le Mans three times. These drives, as well as the losing effort in 1978, often in the rain and at night, were some of the finest ever. Ickx considers the 1977 24 Hours of Le Mans race to be his favourite win of all time. Retiring earlier on in another Porsche 936, which he shared with Henri Pescarolo, the team transferred him to the car of Jürgen Barth and Hurley Haywood which was in 42nd place. Ickx made up for lost laps to lead the race by early morning, but suffered a mechanical problem which forced the car to pit. The mechanics resolved the issue by switching off one cylinder, and Ickx went on to win the race. The win in 1982 came with the new and superior Porsche 956 model, though, which carried him to two titles as world champion of endurance racing, in 1982 and 1983.

In 1983, Ickx was the team leader at Porsche, but a new teammate was faster than he was: young German Stefan Bellof set new lap records at the Nürburgring in the last ever sports car race held on the original configuration of Ickx's favourite track. As it turned out, Ickx and Bellof would become involved in controversial events later on.

In 1984, Ickx acted as Formula One race director in Monaco. He stopped the race before half distance due to heavy rain, just as leader Alain Prost was being caught by a young Ayrton Senna and Bellof. Prost thus won the race but was awarded only half the points for a win (4.5); the Frenchman subsequently lost the 1984 World Championship to McLaren team-mate Niki Lauda by half a point.

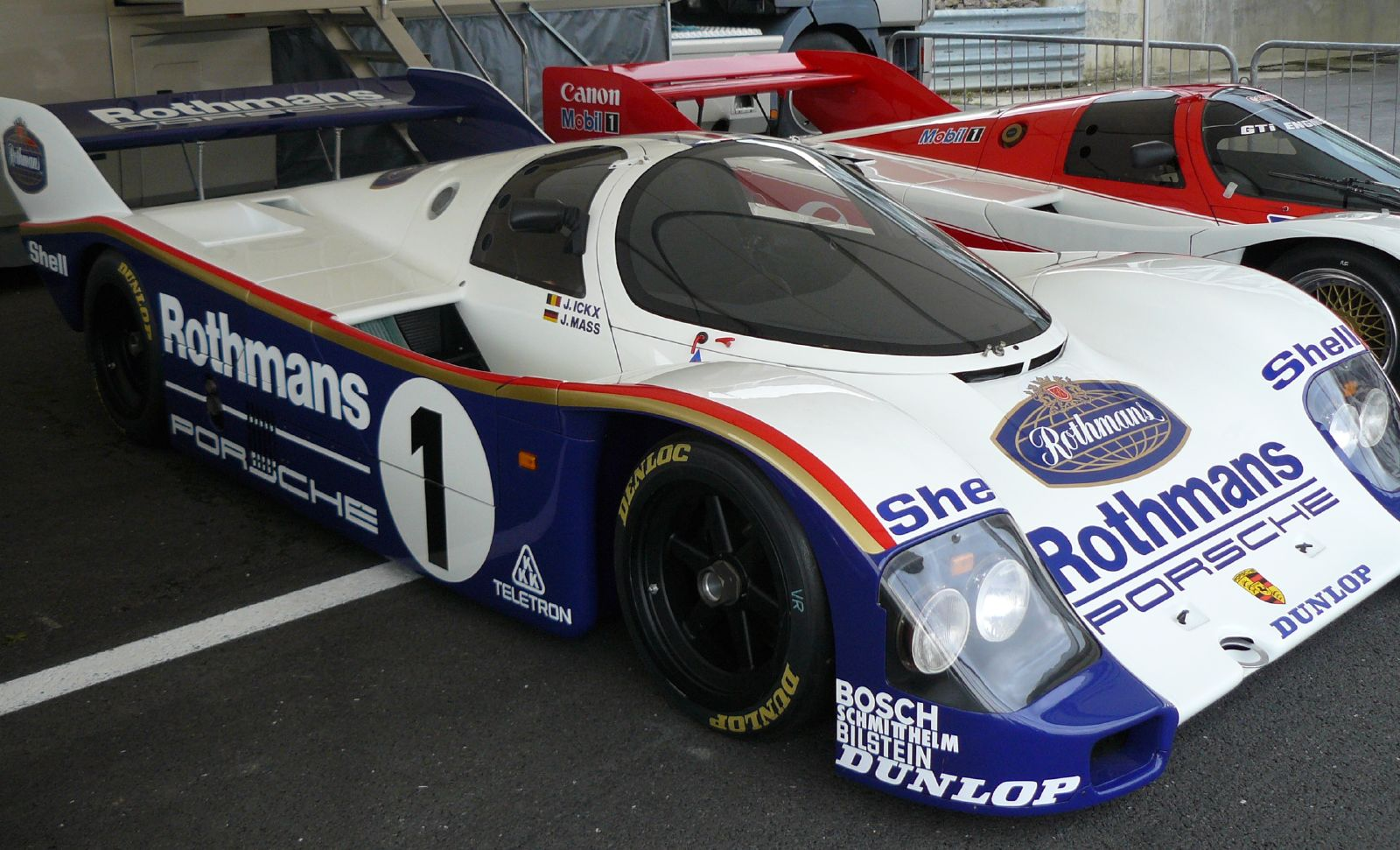
Ickx's Rothmans Porsche 956

In 1985, Ickx was involved with Bellof again, but with fatal consequences. Bellof raced a privateer Porsche while waiting to join the Ferrari in 1986, which had promised him a seat after his performance in Monaco, similar to what they had done for Lauda after he outclassed Ickx there in 1973. At Spa, Ickx's home track, the young German in the private Porsche 956 of Walter Brun tried to pass the experienced Belgian in the factory Porsche 962 for first place after being behind Ickx for three laps. At Eau Rouge corner, Bellof attempted to pass from the left, but Ickx turned left from the right side at the entry of the Eau Rouge and they collided and crashed, Bellof dying an hour later after he crashed the barrier in the "Raidillon" part of the track head-on, while Ickx was shaken but unharmed. He retired from professional circuit racing at the end of the season.

== Further racing career ==
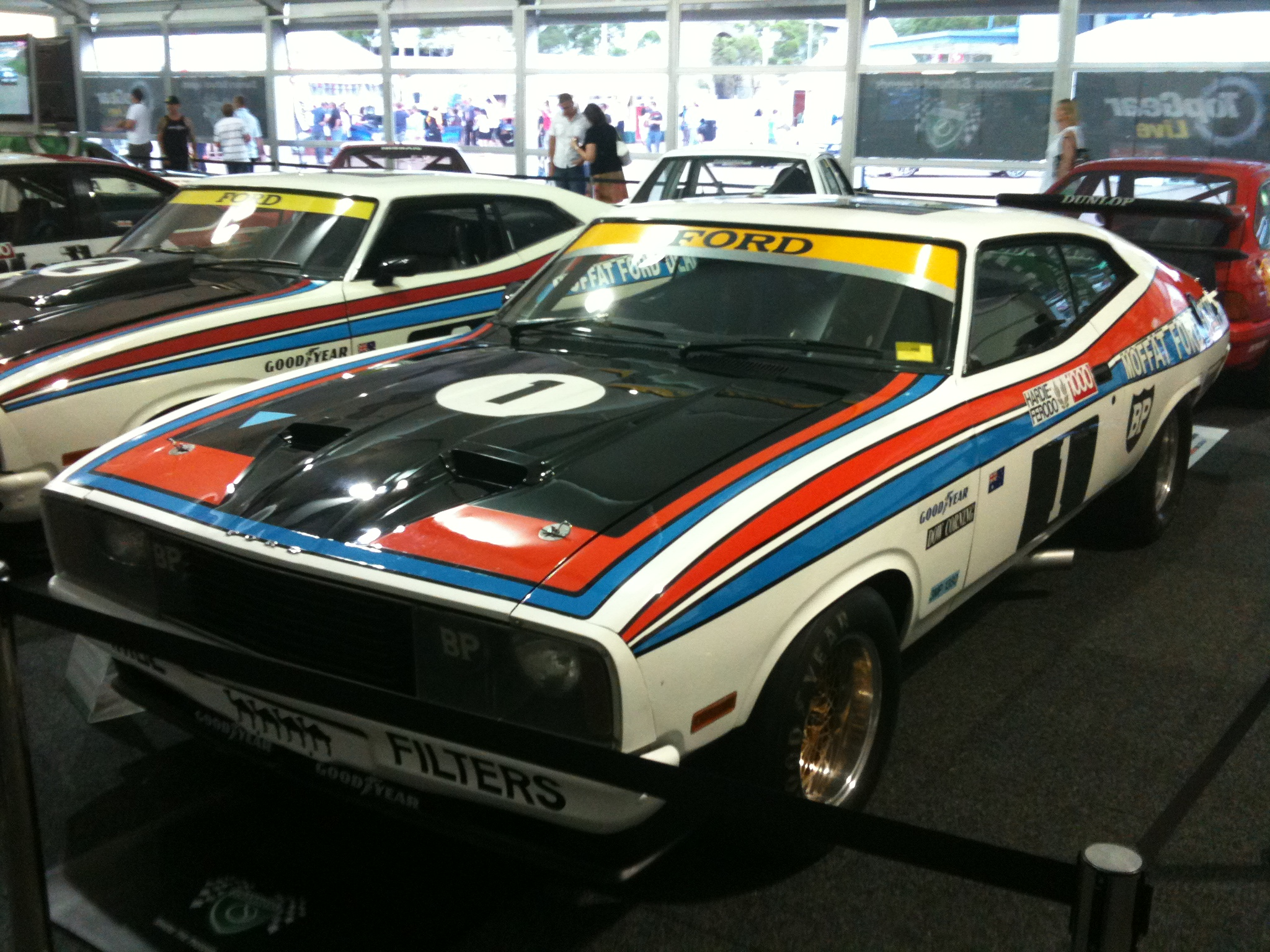
Ford XC Falcon Hardtop Group C race car - Moffat/Ickx 1977 Hardie Ferodo 1000 race winning car

Ickx also co-drove to victory with Allan Moffat at the 1977 Hardie-Ferodo 1000 in Australia, becoming the last debutant to win the race until 2011, when Nick Percat matched this feat partnering two-time winner Garth Tander. The victory at the Bathurst 1000 was in a Ford XC Falcon Group C Touring Car manufactured in Australia with limited modifications for racing. After only days practice in a car he had never driven before he was doing lap times the same or quicker than drivers who drove nothing else and who were familiar with the circuit. Ickx visited Bathurst's National Motor Racing Museum in January 2025, where he was reunited with the car he and Moffat had driven to victory some 38 years prior.

In 1979, in the newly reborn Can-Am series for rebodied covered wheel Formula 5000 cars, Ickx won against strong opposition from Keke Rosberg, Elliot Forbes-Robinson, and Bobby Rahal. Formula One fledgling Rosberg drove his Can Am car with ferocity, but often went off the road trying to match the pace of Ickx, who won the series decisively at the season finale at Riverside. The previous weekend, on the dangerous and undulating Laguna Seca circuit near Monterey, Ickx elected to race conservatively rather than going after leaders Forbes-Robinson and Rosberg, but film of the race indicates the brutal nature of this late generation of Can Am racing. Ickx did not return to defend his title the following season.

One of Ickx's other Le Mans victories in a non-driving capacity was when he consulted for the Oreca team who were running a Mazda 787B for Mazdaspeed in 1991. Ickx was also selected to participate in the 1978 and 1984 editions of the International Race of Champions.

Although he had never driven a stock car before, Ickx was entered to race in the 1969 Daytona 500, in a car owned by Junior Johnson. A few days before the race, Ickx crashed the car during practice, and although he was not injured, the car was damaged beyond repair. The team's only backup car was needed by eventual race winner LeeRoy Yarbrough, so Ickx did not have the opportunity to race.

After he retired from his professional racing career, Ickx continued to compete in the Paris-Dakar Rally, even competing with daughter Vanina in recent years. He won the event in 1983 driving a Mercedes-Benz G-Class. Nowadays, he appears in historic events as a driver, such as the Goodwood Festival of Speed and the Monterey Historics, usually on behalf of Porsche, Ferrari and Genesis. He still acts as the Clerk of the Course for the Monaco Grand Prix and is still a resident of Brussels.

== Awards and honours ==
=== Awards ===
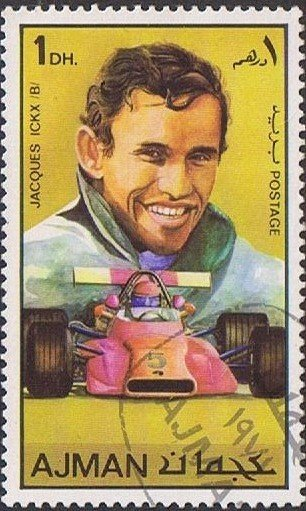
Ickx on a 1971 Stamp of Ajman

- RACB Belgian driver's champion: 1967->1974, 1976, 1977, 1979, 1982 (record)
- Belgian National Sports Merit Award: 1968
- Belgian Sportsman of the Year: 1982
- ACO Spirit of Le Mans trophy: 2004
- Paris International Automobile Festival Palme d'Or: 2012
- Autosprint - Helmet Legend: 2014
- World Sports - Legends Award: 2017
- Autosport Awards - Gregor Grant Award: 2018

=== Honours ===
- Named as an 'Honorary Citizen of Le Mans' prior to the 2000 race, the first sports person to be so.
- Inducted into the International Motorsports Hall of Fame in 2002.
- RTBF Best Belgian Sportsman Ever (3rd place, after Eddy Merckx, in between Jean-Michel Saive and Stefan Everts): 2014.
- In honour of his 75th birthday in 2019, Porsche made a special edition of its 911 (992) model called the Carrera 4S Belgian Legend Edition. The car is painted in X-Blue with white trim around the side windows, referring to Ickx's iconic helmet design.
- Inducted into the Motorsports Hall of Fame of America in 2020.
- Bronze Zinneke

=== Decorations ===
- Officer in the Belgian Order of the Crown: 2000
- Officer in the Monegasque Order of Saint-Charles: 2000
- Grand Officer in the Belgian Order of Leopold II: 2007

== Personal life ==
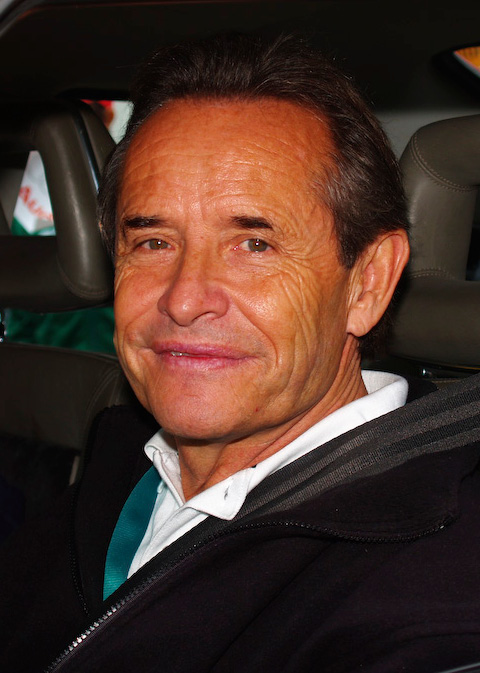
Ickx in 2007

Ickx is married to singer Khadja Nin. The couple were guests at the wedding of Prince Albert of Monaco and Charlene Wittstock in July 2011. Ickx became a resident of Monaco in the early 1980s.

Ickx's father Jacques Ickx (1910–1978) and older brother Pascal Ickx (born 1937) were racing drivers. His daughter, Vanina Ickx (from his first marriage with Catherine Ickx) followed in her father's footsteps to become a racing driver as well.

Despite his career, Ickx has said that during his youth he disliked noise and had ambitions to be a gardener or gamekeeper.

== Racing record ==
=== Career summary ===
Season	Series	Team	Races	Wins	Poles	F/laps	Podiums	Points	Position
1966	Formula One	Tyrrell Racing Organisation	1	0	0	0	0	0	NC
1966	24 Hours of Le Mans	Essex Wire Corporation	1	0	0	0	0	N/A	DNF
1966	British Saloon Car Championship	Team Lotus	4	0	0	0	1	20	12th
1966	British Saloon Car Championship - Class C	Team Lotus	4	1	0	1	3	20	**3rd**
1967	European Formula Two	Tyrrell Racing Organisation	8	1	2	3	4	45	**1st**
1967	World Sportscar Championship	J.W. Automotive	3	1	0	0	1	10	NC
1967	Formula One	Cooper Car Company	2	0	0	0	0	1	21st
1967	Formula One	Tyrrell Racing Organisation	1	0	0	0	0	1	21st
1967	24 Hours of Le Mans	J.W. Automotive	1	0	0	0	0	N/A	DNF
1967	British Saloon Car Championship	Team Lotus	3	0	0	0	2	16	15th
1967	British Saloon Car Championship - Class C	Team Lotus	3	2	0	1	2	16	4th
1968	Formula One	Scuderia Ferrari	9	1	1	0	4	27	4th
1968	World Sportscar Championship	J.W. Automotive	4	3	0	1	4	28	NC
1968	European Formula Two	Scuderia Ferrari	2	0	0	0	0	0	NC^{‡}
1969	Formula One	Motor Racing Developments Ltd	11	2	2	3	5	37	**2nd**
1969	World Sportscar Championship	J.W. Automotive	2	2	0	0	2	16	NC
1969	24 Hours of Le Mans	J.W. Automotive	1	1	0	0	1	N/A	**1st**
1969	European Formula Two	Alejandro de Tomaso	1	0	0	0	0	0	NC
1970	Formula One	Scuderia Ferrari	13	3	4	5	5	40	**2nd**
1970	European Formula Two Championship	Bayerische Motoren Werke	5	1	1	1	2	0	NC^{‡}
1970	World Sportscar Championship	Scuderia Ferrari	4	0	1	0	2	12	NC
1970	24 Hours of Le Mans	Scuderia Ferrari	1	0	0	0	0	N/A	DNF
1971	Formula One	Scuderia Ferrari	11	1	2	2	3	19	4th
1971	World Sportscar Championship	Scuderia Ferrari	7	0	2	1	1	6	NC
1972	Formula One	Scuderia Ferrari	12	1	4	3	4	27	4th
1972	World Sportscar Championship	Scuderia Ferrari	9	6	3	4	7	136	NC
1973	Formula One	Scuderia Ferrari	10	0	0	0	0	12	9th
1973	Formula One	Yardley Team McLaren	1	0	0	0	1	12	9th
1973	Formula One	Frank Williams Racing Cars	1	0	0	0	0	12	9th
1973	World Sportscar Championship	Scuderia Ferrari	9	2	1	0	6	94	NC
1973	24 Hours of Le Mans	Scuderia Ferrari	1	0	0	0	0	N/A	DNF
1974	Formula One	John Player Team Lotus	15	0	0	0	2	12	10th
1974	World Sportscar Championship	Autodelta	3	0	0	1	1	55	NC
1974	World Sportscar Championship	Equipe Gitanes	1	1	0	1	1	55	NC
1974	World Sportscar Championship	J.W. Automotive	1	0	0	0	1	55	NC
1974	World Sportscar Championship	BMW Motorsport	1	0	0	0	0	55	NC
1975	Formula One	John Player Team Lotus	9	0	0	0	1	3	16th
1975	World Sportscar Championship	Willi Kauhsen Racing Team	2	0	1	1	2	30	NC
1975	24 Hours of Le Mans	Gulf Research Racing	1	0	0	0	1	N/A	**1st**
1976	World Championship for Makes	Martini Racing Porsche System	6	3	5	4	4	73	NC
1976	World Sportscar Championship	Martini Racing Porsche System	4	3	1	0	4	80	NC
1976	Formula One	Team Ensign	4	0	0	0	0	0	NC
1976	Formula One	Frank Williams Racing Cars	2	0	0	0	0	0	NC
1976	Formula One	Walter Wolf Racing	2	0	0	0	0	0	NC
1976	24 Hours of Le Mans	Martini Racing Porsche System	1	0	0	0	1	N/A	**1st**
1977	World Championship for Makes	Martini Racing Porsche System	7	3	6	2	3	60	NC
1977	24 Hours of Le Mans	Martini Racing Porsche System	1	1	0	1	1	N/A	**1st**
1977	Formula One	Team Tissot Ensign with Castrol	1	0	0	0	0	0	NC
1978	World Sportscar Championship	Martini Racing Porsche System	3	1	2	1	1	35	NC
1978	World Sportscar Championship	Max Moritz	1	0	0	0	1	35	NC
1978	Formula One	Team Tissot Ensign	3	0	0	0	0	0	NC
1978	24 Hours of Le Mans	Martini Racing Porsche System	1	0	1	0	1	N/A	**2nd**
1979	Formula One	Ligier Gitanes	8	0	0	0	0	3	16th
1979	Can-Am	Carl A. Haas Racing Team	9	5	1	2	6	51	**1st**
1979	World Sportscar Championship	Georg Loos	3	0	0	0	2	30	NC
1979	24 Hours of Le Mans	Essex Motorsport Porsche	1	0	0	1	0	N/A	DNF
1980	24 Hours of Le Mans	Equipe Liqui Moly – Martini Racing	1	0	0	1	1	N/A	**2nd**
1981	24 Hours of Le Mans	Porsche System	1	1	1	0	1	N/A	**1st**
1982	World Sportscar Championship	Rothmans Porsche System	5	4	3	1	5	95	**1st**
1982	24 Hours of Le Mans	Porsche System	1	1	1	0	1	N/A	**1st**
1983	World Sportscar Championship	Rothmans Porsche	7	2	2	1	6	97	**1st**
1984	World Sportscar Championship	Rothmans Porsche	8	2	0	0	6	104	**3rd**
1985	World Sportscar Championship	Rothmans Porsche	10	3	2	0	5	101	**3rd**

^{‡} Graded drivers not eligible for European Formula Two Championship points

=== Complete British Saloon Car Championship results ===
(key) (Races in bold indicate pole position; races in italics indicate fastest lap.)

Year	Team	Car	Class	1	2	3	4	5	6	7	8	9	10	Pos.	Pts	Class
1966	Team Lotus	Ford Cortina Lotus	C	SNE	GOO	SIL ovr:4 cls:2	CRY ovr:3† cls:1†	BRH ovr:5 cls:2	BRH	OUL	BRH; Ret			12th	20	**3rd**
1967	Team Lotus	Ford Cortina Lotus	C	BRH	SNE	SIL	SIL	MAL ovr:3† cls:1†	SIL	SIL	BRH ovr:2 cls:1	OUL; Ret†	BRH	15th	16	4th

† Events with 2 races staged for the different classes.

=== Complete Formula One World Championship results ===
(key) (Races in bold indicate pole position; results in italics indicate fastest lap)

Year	Entrant	Chassis	Engine	1	2	3	4	5	6	7	8	9	10	11	12	13	14	15	16	17	WDC	Pts
1966	Tyrrell Racing Organisation	Matra MS5 (F2)	Ford Cosworth SCA 1.0 L4	MON	BEL	FRA	GBR	NED	GER; Ret	ITA	USA	MEX									NC	0
1967	Tyrrell Racing Organisation	Matra MS5 (F2)	Ford Cosworth FVA 1.6 L4	RSA	MON	NED	BEL	FRA	GBR	GER; Ret	CAN										21st	1
1967	Cooper Car Company	Cooper T81B	Maserati 10/F1 3.0 V12									ITA; 6									21st	1
1967	Cooper Car Company	Cooper T86	Maserati 10/F1 3.0 V12										USA; Ret	MEX							21st	1
1968	Scuderia Ferrari SpA SEFAC	Ferrari 312/67	Ferrari 242 3.0 V12	RSA; Ret																	4th	27
1968	Scuderia Ferrari SpA SEFAC	Ferrari 312/68	Ferrari 242C 3.0 V12		ESP; Ret	MON		NED; 4	FRA; 1	GBR; 3	**GER**; 4	ITA; 3	CAN; DNS	USA							4th	27
1968	Scuderia Ferrari SpA SEFAC	Ferrari 312/67/68	Ferrari 242 3.0 V12				BEL; 3								MEX; Ret						4th	27
1969	Motor Racing Developments Ltd	Brabham BT26A	Ford Cosworth DFV 3.0 V8	RSA; Ret	ESP; 6	MON; Ret	NED; 5	FRA; 3	GBR; 2	**GER**; 1	ITA; 10	**CAN**; 1	USA; Ret	MEX; 2							**2nd**	**37**
1970	Scuderia Ferrari SpA SEFAC	Ferrari 312B	Ferrari 001 3.0 F12	RSA; Ret	ESP; Ret	MON; Ret	BEL; 8	NED; 3	**FRA**; Ret	GBR; Ret	**GER**; 2	AUT; 1	**ITA**; Ret	CAN; 1	**USA**; 4	MEX; 1					**2nd**	**40**
1971	Scuderia Ferrari SpA SEFAC	Ferrari 312B	Ferrari 001 3.0 F12	RSA; 8	**ESP**; 2							ITA; Ret		USA; Ret							4th	19
1971	Scuderia Ferrari SpA SEFAC	Ferrari 312B2	Ferrari 001/1 3.0 F12			MON; 3	**NED**; 1	FRA; Ret	GBR; Ret	GER; Ret	AUT; Ret		CAN; 8								4th	19
1972	Scuderia Ferrari SpA SEFAC	Ferrari 312B2	Ferrari 001/1 3.0 F12	ARG; 3	RSA; 8	**ESP**; 2	MON; 2	BEL; Ret	FRA; 11	**GBR**; Ret	**GER**; 1	AUT; Ret	**ITA**; Ret	CAN; 12	USA; 5						4th	27
1973	Scuderia Ferrari SpA SEFAC	Ferrari 312B2	Ferrari 001/1 3.0 F12	ARG; 4	BRA; 5	RSA; Ret															9th	12
1973	Scuderia Ferrari SpA SEFAC	Ferrari 312B3	Ferrari 001/11 3.0 F12				ESP; 12	BEL; Ret	MON; Ret	SWE; 6	FRA; 5	GBR; 8	NED			ITA; 8	CAN				9th	12
1973	Yardley Team McLaren	McLaren M23	Ford Cosworth DFV 3.0 V8											GER; 3	AUT						9th	12
1973	Frank Williams Racing Cars	Iso–Marlboro IR	Ford Cosworth DFV 3.0 V8															USA; 7			9th	12
1974	John Player Team Lotus	Lotus 72E	Ford Cosworth DFV 3.0 V8	ARG; Ret	BRA; 3				MON; Ret	SWE; Ret	NED; 11	FRA; 5	GBR; 3	GER; 5			CAN; 13	USA; Ret			10th	12
1974	John Player Team Lotus	Lotus 76	Ford Cosworth DFV 3.0 V8			RSA; Ret	ESP; Ret	BEL; Ret							AUT; Ret	ITA; Ret					10th	12
1975	John Player Team Lotus	Lotus 72E	Ford Cosworth DFV 3.0 V8	ARG; 8	BRA; 9	RSA; 12	ESP; 2	MON; 8	BEL; Ret	SWE; 15	NED; Ret	FRA; Ret	GBR	GER	AUT	ITA	USA				16th	3
1976	Frank Williams Racing Cars	Wolf–Williams FW05	Ford Cosworth DFV 3.0 V8	BRA; 8	RSA; 16	USW; DNQ															NC	0
1976	Walter Wolf Racing	Wolf–Williams FW05	Ford Cosworth DFV 3.0 V8				ESP; 7	BEL; DNQ	MON; DNQ	SWE	FRA; 10	GBR; DNQ	GER	AUT							NC	0
1976	Team Tissot Ensign	Ensign N176	Ford Cosworth DFV 3.0 V8												NED; Ret	ITA; 10	CAN; 13	USA; Ret	JPN		NC	0
1977	Team Tissot Ensign with Castrol	Ensign N177	Ford Cosworth DFV 3.0 V8	ARG	BRA	RSA	USW	ESP	MON; 10	BEL	SWE	FRA	GBR	GER	AUT	NED	ITA	USA	CAN	JPN	NC	0
1978	Team Tissot Ensign	Ensign N177	Ford Cosworth DFV 3.0 V8	ARG	BRA	RSA	USW	MON; Ret	BEL; 12	ESP; Ret	SWE; DNQ	FRA	GBR	GER	AUT	NED	ITA	USA	CAN		NC	0
1979	Ligier Gitanes	Ligier JS11	Ford Cosworth DFV 3.0 V8	ARG	BRA	RSA	USW	ESP	BEL	MON	FRA; Ret	GBR; 6	GER; Ret	AUT; Ret	NED; 5	ITA; Ret	CAN; Ret	USA; Ret			16th	3

=== Complete Formula One non-championship results ===
(key) (Races in bold indicate pole position) (Races in italics indicate fastest lap)

Year	Entrant	Chassis	Engine	1	2	3	4	5	6	7	8
1967	Matra Sports	Matra MS5 (F2)	Ford Cosworth FVA 1.6 L4	ROC; Ret	SPC	INT	SYR				
1967	Tyrrell Racing Organisation	Matra MS5 (F2)	Ford Cosworth FVA 1.6 L4					OUL; Ret	ESP; 6		
1968	Scuderia Ferrari SpA SEFAC	Ferrari 312/67	Ferrari 242 3.0 V12	ROC; 8							
1968	Scuderia Ferrari SpA SEFAC	Ferrari 312/68	Ferrari 242C 3.0 V12		INT; 4	OUL; Ret					
1969	Motor Racing Developments Ltd	Brabham BT26A	Ford Cosworth DFV 3.0 V8	ROC; Ret	INT; 4	MAD	OUL; 1				
1971	Scuderia Ferrari SpA SEFAC	Ferrari 312B	Ferrari 001 3.0 F12	ARG	ROC	QUE; 11	SPR	INT	**RIN**; 1	OUL	VIC
1974	John Player Team Lotus	Lotus 72E	Ford Cosworth DFV 3.0 V8	PRE	ROC; 1	INT					
1975	John Player Team Lotus	Lotus 72E	Ford Cosworth DFV 3.0 V8	ROC; 4	INT	SUI					
1976	Frank Williams Racing Cars	Wolf–Williams FW05	Ford Cosworth DFV 3.0 V8	ROC; 3	INT; Ret						
1978	Team Tissot Ensign	Ensign N177	Ford Cosworth DFV 3.0 V8	INT; Ret							

=== Complete European Formula Two Championship results ===
(key) (Races in bold indicate pole position; races in italics indicate fastest lap)

Year	Entrant	Chassis	Engine	1	2	3	4	5	6	7	8	9	10	Pos.	Pts
1967	Tyrrell Racing Organisation	Matra MS5	Ford	SNE; DNQ	SIL; 7	NÜR; 3	HOC; 10			**ZAN**; 1	PER; 3	BRH; 5		1st	45
1967	Tyrrell Racing Organisation	Matra MS7	Ford					TUL; 5	JAR				**VLL**; 1	1st	45
1968	Scuderia Ferrari	Ferrari 166	Ferrari	HOC	THR	JAR	PAL; Ret	TUL	ZAN	PER; 6	HOC	VLL		NC	0^{‡}
1969	Alejandro de Tomaso	De Tomaso 103	Ford	THR	HOC	NÜR	JAR	TUL	PER; Ret	VLL				NC	0
1970	Bayerische Motoren Werke	BMW 270	BMW	THR; 6	HOC	BAR	ROU; 4	**PER**; 3	TUL; 1	IMO; Ret	HOC			NC	0^{‡}

^{‡} Graded drivers not eligible for European Formula Two Championship points

=== Complete 24 Hours of Le Mans results ===
Year	Team	Co-drivers	Car	Class	Laps	Pos.	Class pos.
1966	(United States) Essex Wire Corporation	(Germany) Jochen Neerpasch	Ford GT40 Mk.I	S 5.0	154	DNF	DNF
1967	(United Kingdom) John Wyer Automotive Engineering	(Australia) Brian Muir	Mirage M1-Ford	P +5.0	29	DNF	DNF
1969	(United Kingdom) John Wyer Automotive Engineering	(United Kingdom) Jackie Oliver	Ford GT40 Mk.I	S 5.0	372	**1st**	**1st**
1970	(Italy) SpA Ferrari SEFAC	(Switzerland) Peter Schetty	Ferrari 512S	S 5.0	142	DNF	DNF
1973	(Italy) SpA Ferrari SEFAC	(United Kingdom) Brian Redman	Ferrari 312PB	S 3.0	332	DNF	DNF
1975	(United Kingdom) Gulf Research Racing	(United Kingdom) Derek Bell	Mirage GR8-Ford Cosworth	S 3.0	336	**1st**	**1st**
1976	(Germany) Martini Racing Porsche System	(Netherlands) Gijs van Lennep	Porsche 936	S 3.0	349	**1st**	**1st**
1977	(Germany) Martini Racing Porsche System	(Germany) Jürgen Barth (United States) Hurley Haywood	Porsche 936/77	S +2.0	342	**1st**	**1st**
1978	(Germany) Martini Racing Porsche System	(France) Bob Wollek (Germany) Jürgen Barth	Porsche 936/78	S +2.0	364	**2nd**	**2nd**
1979	(Germany) Essex Motorsport Porsche	(United Kingdom) Brian Redman (Germany) Jürgen Barth	Porsche 936	S +2.0	200	DNF	DNF
1980	(Germany) Equipe Liqui Moly – Martini Racing	(Germany) Reinhold Joest	Porsche 908/80	S +2.0	336	**2nd**	**2nd**
1981	(Germany) Porsche System	(United Kingdom) Derek Bell	Porsche 936	S +2.0	354	**1st**	**1st**
1982	(Germany) Rothmans Porsche System	(United Kingdom) Derek Bell	Porsche 956	C	359	**1st**	**1st**
1983	(Germany) Rothmans Porsche	(United Kingdom) Derek Bell	Porsche 956	C	370	**2nd**	**2nd**
1985	(Germany) Rothmans Porsche	(Germany) Jochen Mass	Porsche 962C	C1	348	10th	10th

=== Complete World Sportscar Championship results ===
(key) (Races in bold indicate pole position; results in italics indicate fastest lap)

Year	Entrant	Chassis	Engine	Class	1	2	3	4	5	6	7	8	9	10	11	12	13	14	15
1966	Ecurie Francorchamps	Ferrari 250LM	Ferrari V12	P+2.0	DAY; Ret	SEB	MZA	TGA	SPA	NÜR									
1966	Essex Wire Corporation	Ford GT40 Mk.I	Ford V8	P+2.0							LMS; Ret	HOC							
1967	J.W. Automotive Engineering, Ltd.	Ford GT40 Mk.I (Mirage)	Ford V8	P+2.0	DAY; 6	SEB													
1967	J.W. Automotive Engineering, Ltd.	Mirage M1	Ford V8	P+2.0			MZA; Ret	SPA; 1	TGA	NÜR; Ret	LMS; Ret	BRH							
1968	J.W. Automotive Engineering, Ltd.	Ford GT40 Mk.I (Mirage)	Ford V8	S 5.0	**DAY**; Ret	SEB; Ret	BRH; 1	**MZA**; Ret	TGA	NÜR; 3	SPA; 1	WGN; 1	ZEL	LMS					
1969	J.W. Automotive Engineering, Ltd.	Ford GT40 Mk.I (Mirage)	Ford V8	S 5.0	DAY; 26	SEB; 1						LMS; 1							
1969	J.W. Automotive Engineering, Ltd.	Mirage M1	Ford V8	S 5.0			BRH; Ret	MZA	TGA	SPA; Ret	NÜR; Ret		WGN; Ret	**ÖST**; Ret					
1970	SpA Ferrari SEFAC	Ferrari 512S	Ferrari V12	S 5.0	DAY; 3	SEB; Ret	BRH; 8	MZA; 3	TGA	SPA; 2	NÜR; DNS		WGN; 8						
1970	SpA Ferrari SEFAC	Ferrari 512S Coda Lunga	Ferrari V12	S 5.0								LMS; Ret							
1970	SpA Ferrari SEFAC	Ferrari 512M	Ferrari V12	S 5.0										ÖST; Ret					
1971	SpA Ferrari SEFAC	Ferrari 312PB	Ferrari Flat-12	P 3.0	BUE	DAY	SEB; Ret	BRH; 2	MZA; Ret	SPA; 8	TGA	**NÜR**; Ret	LMS	ÖST; Ret	WGN; Ret				
1972	SpA Ferrari SEFAC	Ferrari 312PB	Ferrari Flat-12	P 3.0	BUE; 8	**DAY**; 1	**SEB**; 1	BRH; 1	MZA; 1	**SPA**; 2	TGA	NÜR; Ret	LMS	ÖST; 1	WGN; 1				
1973	SpA Ferrari SEFAC	Ferrari 312PB	Ferrari Flat-12	P 3.0	DAY	VLL; 3	DIJ; 2	MZA; 1	**SPA**; Ret	TGA; Ret	NÜR; 1	LMS; Ret	ÖST; 3	WGN; 2					
1974	Autodelta SpA	Alfa Romeo 33TT12	Alfa Romeo Flat-12	P 3.0	MZA; 2			IMO; Ret	LMS	ÖST; 5	WGN								
1974	Equipe Gitanes	Matra-Simca MS670C	Matra V12	P 3.0		SPA; 1													
1974	BMW Motorsport GmbH	BMW 3.0 CSL	BMW Straight-6	T+ 2000			NÜR; Ret												
1974	Gulf Research Racing	Mirage GR7	Ford-Cosworth V8	P 3.0								RIC; 3	BRH	KYA					
1975	Willi Kauhsen Racing Team	Alfa Romeo 33TT12	Alfa Romeo Flat-12	P 3.0	DAY	MUG; 2	DIJ; 1	MZA	SPA; 2	ENN; Ret	NÜR	ÖST	WGN						
1976 (Drivers)	Martini Racing Porsche System	Porsche 936	Porsche Flat-6 (t/c)	Group 6	NÜR	MZA; 1	IMO; 1	ENN	MOS; 3	DIJ; 1	SLZ								
1976 (Makes)	Martini Racing Porsche System	Porsche 935	Porsche Flat-6 (t/c)	Group 5	**MUG**; 1	VAL; 1	SIL; 10	NÜR	**ÖST**; Ret	WGN; 3	DIJ; 1								
1977 (Makes)	Martini Racing Porsche System	Porsche 935	Porsche Flat-6 (t/c)	Group 5	DAY; Ret	MUG	SIL; 1	**NÜR**; Ret	**WGN**; 1	**MOS**; 21	**BRH**; 1	HOC; 1	VLL						
1978	Martini Racing Porsche System	Porsche 935	Porsche Flat-6 (t/c)	Group 5	DAY	MUG	**SIL**; 1					VLL; Ret							
1978	Jägermeister-Max Moritz Team	Porsche 935	Porsche Flat-6 (t/c)	Group 5				NÜR; 2	DIJ	MIS									
1978	Vasek Polak Racing	Porsche 935	Porsche Flat-6 (t/c)	Group 5							WGN; 26								
1979	Gelo Racing Team	Porsche 935	Porsche Flat-6 (t/c)	Group 5	DAY; 32	MUG; 2	DIJ; 2	SIL; 5	NÜR	ENN	WGN	BRH	VLL						
1980	Martini Racing - Liqui Moly	Porsche 908/J80	Porsche Flat-6 (t/c)	Group 6 S 3.0	D24	BRH	MUG	MZA	SIL	NÜR	LMS; 2	WGN	MOS	VLL	DIJ				
1980	Martini Racing - Liqui Moly	Porsche 908/J80	Porsche Flat-6 (t/c)	Group 6 S 3.0	D24	SEB	MZA	RIV	SIL	NÜR	LMS; 2	DA6	SPA	MOS	RDA				
1981 (Makes)	Porsche System	Porsche 936/81	Porsche Flat-6 (t/c)	Group 6	D24	MZA	SIL	NÜR	**LMS**; 1	WGN									
1981 (Drivers)	Porsche System	Porsche 936/81	Porsche Flat-6 (t/c)	Group 6	D24	SEB	MUG	MZA	RIV	SIL	NÜR	**LMS**; 1	ENN	DA6	WGN	SPA	MOS	RDA	BRH
1982	Rothmans Porsche	Porsche 956	Porsche Flat-6 (t/c)	Group C	MZA	**SIL**; 2	NÜR	**LMS**; 1	**SPA**; 1	MUG	FUJ; 1	BRH; 1							
1983	Rothmans Porsche	Porsche 956	Porsche Flat-6 (t/c)	Group C	MZA; 2	SIL; Ret	NÜR; 1	**LMS**; 2	**SPA**; 1	FUJ; 2	KYA; 3								
1984	Rothmans Porsche	Porsche 956	Porsche Flat-6 (t/c)	Group C	MZA; 2	SIL; 1	LMS	NÜR; 5	BRH	MOS; 1	SPA; 2	IMO; Ret	FUJ; 2	KYA	SAN; 2				
1985	Rothmans Porsche	Porsche 962	Porsche Flat-6 (t/c)	Group C	MUG; 1	MZA; 4	SIL; 1	LMS; 10	HOC; Ret	MOS; 2	SPA; Ret	BRH; 2	FUJ; WD	**SHA**; 1					

=== Complete 24 Hours of Spa results ===
Year	Team	Co-Drivers	Car	Class	Laps	Pos.	Class Pos.
1964		(Belgium) Teddy Pilette	Ford Cortina Lotus	5	231	14th	5th
1965	(Germany) BMW Motorsport	(Germany) Dieter Glemser	BMW 1800 TI/SA	2		DNF	DNF
1966	(Germany) BMW Motorsport	(Germany) Hubert Hahne	BMW 2000ti	3	287	1st	1st
1967	(United Kingdom) Alan Mann Racing	(Germany) Hubert Hahne	Ford Mustang	3	56	DNF	DNF
1978	(Belgium) Belgian VW Club	(United Kingdom) Brian Redman	VW Scirocco GTI	1		DNF	DNF
1998	Renault Sport Belgium	(Belgium) Vanina Ickx	Renault Mégane	SP		DNF	DNF

=== Complete Bathurst 1000 results ===
Year	Team	Co-drivers	Car	Class	Laps	Pos.	Class pos.
1977	(Australia) Moffat Ford Dealers	(Canada) Allan Moffat	Ford XC Falcon GS500 Hardtop	3001cc – 6000cc	163	1st	1st
1978	(Australia) Moffat Ford Dealers	(Canada) Allan Moffat	Ford XC Falcon Cobra	A	81	DNF	DNF

=== Dakar Rally results ===
Year	Class	Vehicle	Position	Stages won
1981	Cars	(France) Citroen	DNF	1
1982	Cars	(Germany) Mercedes	5th	7
1983	Cars	(Germany) Mercedes	**1st**	5
1984	Cars	(Germany) Porsche	6th	9
1985	Cars	(Germany) Porsche	DNF	1
1986	Cars	(Germany) Porsche	**2nd**	1
1987	Cars	(Soviet Union) Lada	DNF	0
1988	Cars	(Soviet Union) Lada	38th	0
1989	Cars	(France) Peugeot	**2nd**	3
1990	Cars	(Soviet Union) Lada	7th	1
1991	Cars	(France) Citroen	DNF	1
1992	Cars	(France) Citroen	6th	0
1993	did not enter			
1994	did not enter			
1995	Cars	(Japan) Toyota	18th	0
1996	did not enter			
1997	did not enter			
1998	did not enter			
1999	did not enter			
2000	Cars	(Japan) Mitsubishi	18th	0

=== Complete Canadian-American Challenge Cup results ===
(key) (Races in bold indicate pole position) (Races in italics indicate fastest lap)

Year	Team	Car	Engine	1	2	3	4	5	6	7	8	9	10	Pos	Points
1979	Carl A. Haas Racing Team	Lola T333CS	Chevrolet V8	**ATL**; 2	CLT; 1	MOS; 1	MOH	WGL; 8	ROA; 1	BRA; 1	CTR; 13	LAG; 8	RIV; 1	1st	51

== Films and books ==
Films

- Grand Prix: The Killer Years by Richard Heap: 2011
- Frankly ... Jacky Ickx by Philip Selkirk: 2011
- 1: Life on the Limit by Paul Crowder: 2013

Books

- Henry, Alan (1985). Brabham, the Grand Prix Cars. Osprey. ISBN 0-905138-36-8.
- Van Vliet, Pierre (2014). Jacky Ickx. Kannibaal. ISBN 9789491376139.
- Heuvink, Ed (2014). Jacky Ickx: Viel mehr als Mister Le Mans / Mister Le Mans, and much more. McKlein Media GmbH & Co. ISBN 978-3927458741.
- Graton, Philippe (2015). Vaillant & Ickx l'intégrale 3. Le Soir-Dupuis. ISBN 9782800164953.
- Dugomier (2016). Jacky Ickx - Tome 01: Le Rainmaster. Glenat. ISBN 978-2344011812.
- Dugomier (2020). Jacky Ickx - Tome 02: Monsieur Le Mans. Glenat. ISBN 978-2344019238.
- Saltinstall, John (2023). Jacky Ickx - His authorised competition History. Evro Publishing Limited. ISBN 9781910505809.

== In popular culture ==
- Ickx often appears as one of the main characters in the famous French comic Michel Vaillant.
- The Chopard company developed three limited edition Chopard Mille Miglia Jacky Ickx Men's watches dedicated to him, with a fourth Chopard watch designed with his cooperation.

== See also ==
- Formula One drivers from Belgium
- List of 24 Hours of Le Mans winners

== Notes ==
Sporting positions
Preceded by Warwick Banks	European Touring Car Championship; Division 3 Champion; 1965	Succeeded by Hubert Hahne
Preceded by Inaugural	European Formula Two Championship; Champion; 1967	Succeeded by Jean-Pierre Beltoise
Preceded by Peter Gethin	Brands Hatch Race of Champions; Winner; 1974	Succeeded by Tom Pryce
Preceded by Pedro Rodriguez; Lucien Bianchi	Winner of the 24 Hours of Le Mans; 1969; With: Jackie Oliver	Succeeded by Hans Herrmann; Richard Attwood
Preceded by Henri Pescarolo; Gérard Larrousse	Winner of the 24 Hours of Le Mans; 1975; With: Derek Bell	Succeeded by Jacky Ickx; Gijs van Lennep
Preceded by Jacky Ickx; Derek Bell	Winner of the 24 Hours of Le Mans; 1976; With: Gijs van Lennep	Succeeded by Jacky Ickx; Hurley Haywood; Jürgen Barth
Preceded by Jacky Ickx; Gijs van Lennep	Winner of the 24 Hours of Le Mans; 1977; With: Hurley Haywood & Jürgen Barth	Succeeded by Jean-Pierre Jaussaud; Didier Pironi
Preceded by Bob Morris; John Fitzpatrick	Winner of the Bathurst 1000; 1977	Succeeded by Peter Brock; Jim Richards
Preceded by Alan Jones	Can-Am; Champion; 1979	Succeeded by Patrick Tambay
Preceded by Jean Rondeau; Jean-Pierre Jaussaud	Winner of the 24 Hours of Le Mans; 1981–1982; With: Derek Bell	Succeeded by Vern Schuppan; Al Holbert; Hurley Haywood
Preceded by Claude Marreau	Dakar Rally; Car Winner; 1983	Succeeded by René Metge
Preceded by Bob Garretson	World Endurance Champion; 1982–1983	Succeeded by Stefan Bellof
Records
Preceded by Eugenio Castellotti; 24 years, 238 days (1955 Belgian GP)	Youngest Grand Prix polesitter 23 years, 216 days (1968 German Grand Prix)	Succeeded by Andrea de Cesaris; 22 years, 308 days (1982 United States GP West)
