= Formula One drivers from Belgium =

List of Formula One drivers who competed as Belgian

- Drivers: 24
- Grands Prix: 433
- Entries: 556
- Starts: 476
- Best season finish: 2nd (1969, 1970)
- Wins: 11
- Podiums: 45
- Pole positions: 14
- Fastest laps: 16
- Points: 387
- First entry: 1950 British Grand Prix
- First win: 1968 French Grand Prix
- Latest win: 1990 Hungarian Grand Prix
- Latest entry: 2018 Abu Dhabi Grand Prix

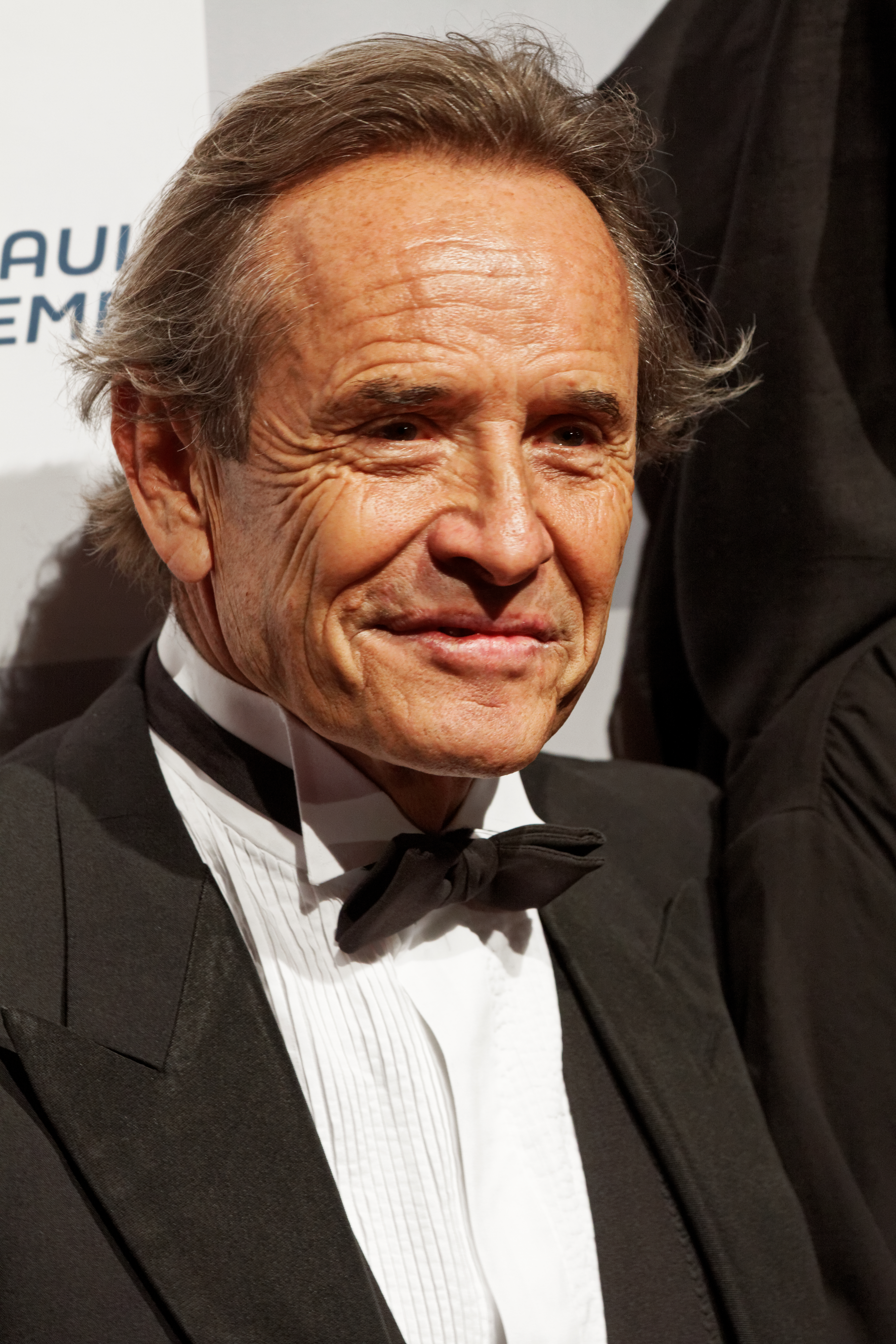
Jacky Ickx, the most successful Belgian Formula One Driver and first Belgian to win a Formula One race

There have been 24 Formula One drivers from Belgium, of whom Jacky Ickx and Thierry Boutsen were the most successful ones as the only Belgians to win races. The most recent Belgian driver is Stoffel Vandoorne, who raced for McLaren in 2017 and 2018. (Note: Lando Norris, Lance Stroll and Max Verstappen all have Belgian nationality, and are still active in the sport as of 2025, but race under other nationalities – British, Canadian and Dutch respectively – as all three drivers hold dual nationality.)

== Former drivers ==
In the early years of Formula One, Belgium was well represented with a highlight in 1953 when there were no less than seven Belgian drivers taking part in the championship.

The first victory for a Belgian only occurred in 1968 when Jacky Ickx won the French Grand Prix. Ickx went on to win eight races in total, reaching the podium 25 times and becoming the runner-up in both the 1969 and 1970 seasons.

The only other driver to win a Grand Prix was Thierry Boutsen, who won three races during his two-year stint with Williams-Renault in 1989–1990 and managed to reach the podium 15 times.

Besides Ickx and Boutsen, the only other Belgian drivers to reach the podium are Olivier Gendebien (who scored two podium finishes), Lucien Bianchi, Paul Frère and Willy Mairesse who each finished on the podium once.

Bertrand Gachot, who was born in Luxembourg as the son of French-German parents carried a French passport but raced under a Belgian FIA Super Licence until 1991, from the 1992 Formula One season he changed to a French licence.

Stoffel Vandoorne was the most recent Belgian driver to compete in Formula One, competing in 3 seasons between 2016 and 2018. While he did not have any podiums or wins, he still had an impressive 41 race starts and 26 overall points.

Charles de Tornaco is the only Belgian driver to be killed during an official event, following a crash during the practice session for the 1953 Modena Grand Prix.

== Driver statistics ==
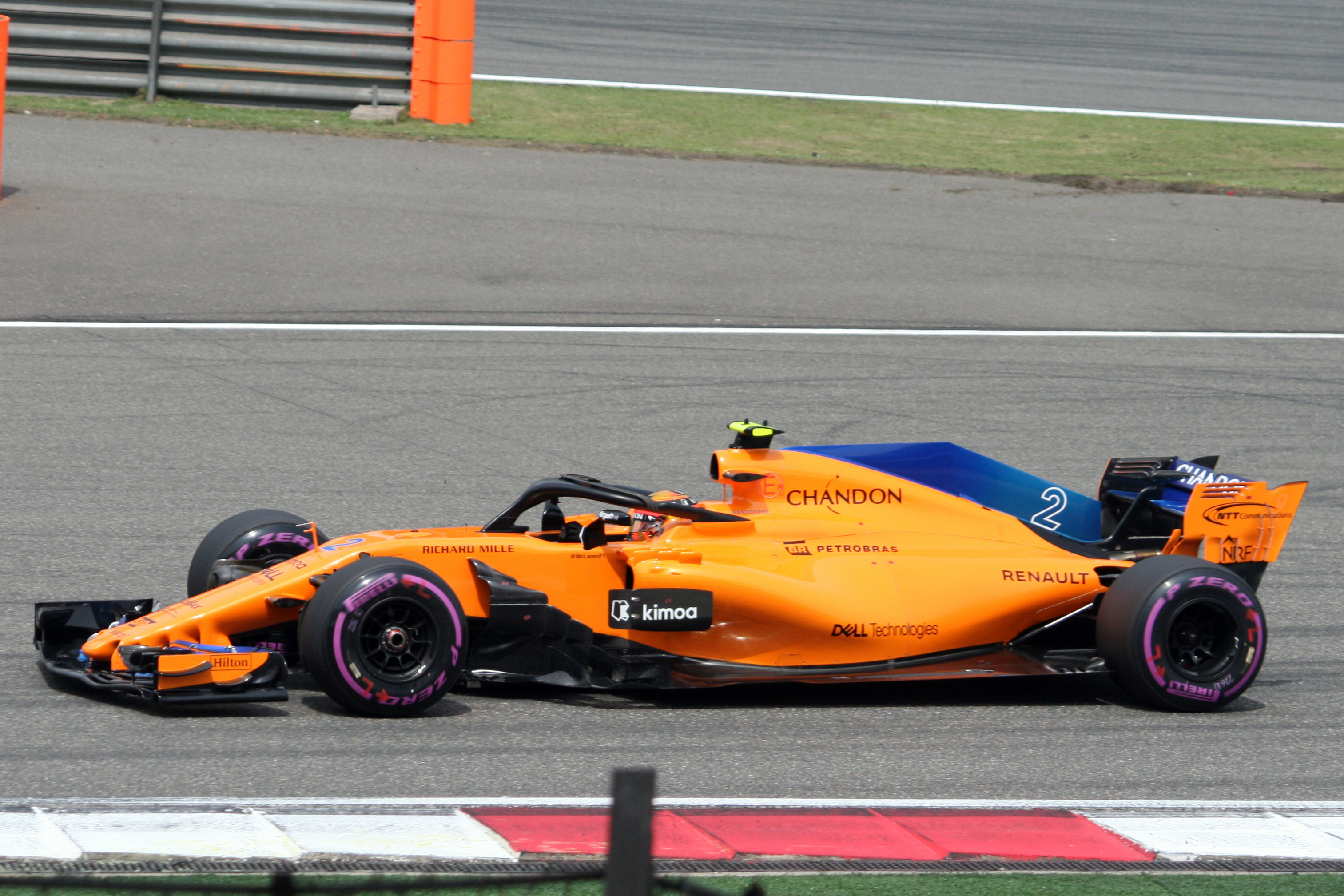
Vandoorne driving for McLaren at the 2018 Chinese Grand Prix.

Driver	Active years	Entries	Wins	Podiums	Pole positions	Career points	Fastest laps
Jacky Ickx	1966–1979	122 (116 starts)	8	25	13	181	14
Thierry Boutsen	1983–1993	164 (163 starts)	3	15	1	132	1
Olivier Gendebien	1956, 1958–1961	15 (14 starts)	0	2	0	18	0
Paul Frère	1952–1956	11	0	1	0	11	0
Willy Mairesse	1960–1963, 1965	13 (12 starts)	0	1	0	7	0
Lucien Bianchi	1959–1963, 1965, 1968	19 (17 starts)	0	1	0	6	0
Stoffel Vandoorne	2016–2018	42 (41 starts)	0	0	0	26	0
Bertrand Gachot (Note: Competed under French racing license in 1992 and 1994–1995. As this article is about Formula One drivers competing under a Belgian licence his stats from 1992 and 1994–1995 are not included in this article but are instead detailed in Formula One drivers from France.)	1989–1991	41 (15 starts)	0	0	0	4	1
André Pilette	1951, 1953–1954, 1956, 1961, 1963–1964	14 (9 starts)	0	0	0	2	0
Eric van de Poele	1991–1992	29 (5 starts)	0	0	0	0	0
Johnny Claes	1950–1953, 1955	25 (23 starts)	0	0	0	0	0
Jérôme d'Ambrosio	2011–2012	20	0	0	0	0	0
Patrick Nève	1976–1977	13 (10 starts)	0	0	0	0	0
Jacques Swaters	1951, 1953–1954	8 (7 starts)	0	0	0	0	0
Charles de Tornaco	1952–1953	4 (2 starts)	0	0	0	0	0
Teddy Pilette	1974, 1977	4 (1 start)	0	0	0	0	0
Philippe Adams	1994	2	0	0	0	0	0
Georges Berger	1953–1954	2	0	0	0	0	0
Roger Laurent	1952	2	0	0	0	0	0
Arthur Legat	1952–1953	2	0	0	0	0	0
Bernard de Dryver	1977	1 (0 starts)	0	0	0	0	0
André Milhoux	1956	1	0	0	0	0	0
Christian Goethals	1958	1	0	0	0	0	0
Alain de Changy	1959	1 (0 starts)	0	0	0	0	0

== See also ==
- List of Formula One Grand Prix winners
