= Canton of Olivet =

Coordinates: 47.86°N 1.90°E

The canton of Olivet is an administrative division of the Loiret department, central France. Its borders were not modified at the French canton reorganisation which came into effect in March 2015. Its seat is in Olivet.

It consists of the following communes:

1. Olivet
2. Saint-Hilaire-Saint-Mesmin
3. Saint-Pryvé-Saint-Mesmin
