= Hôtel de Ville, Olivet =

Town hall in La Olivet, Loiret, France

Hôtel de Ville
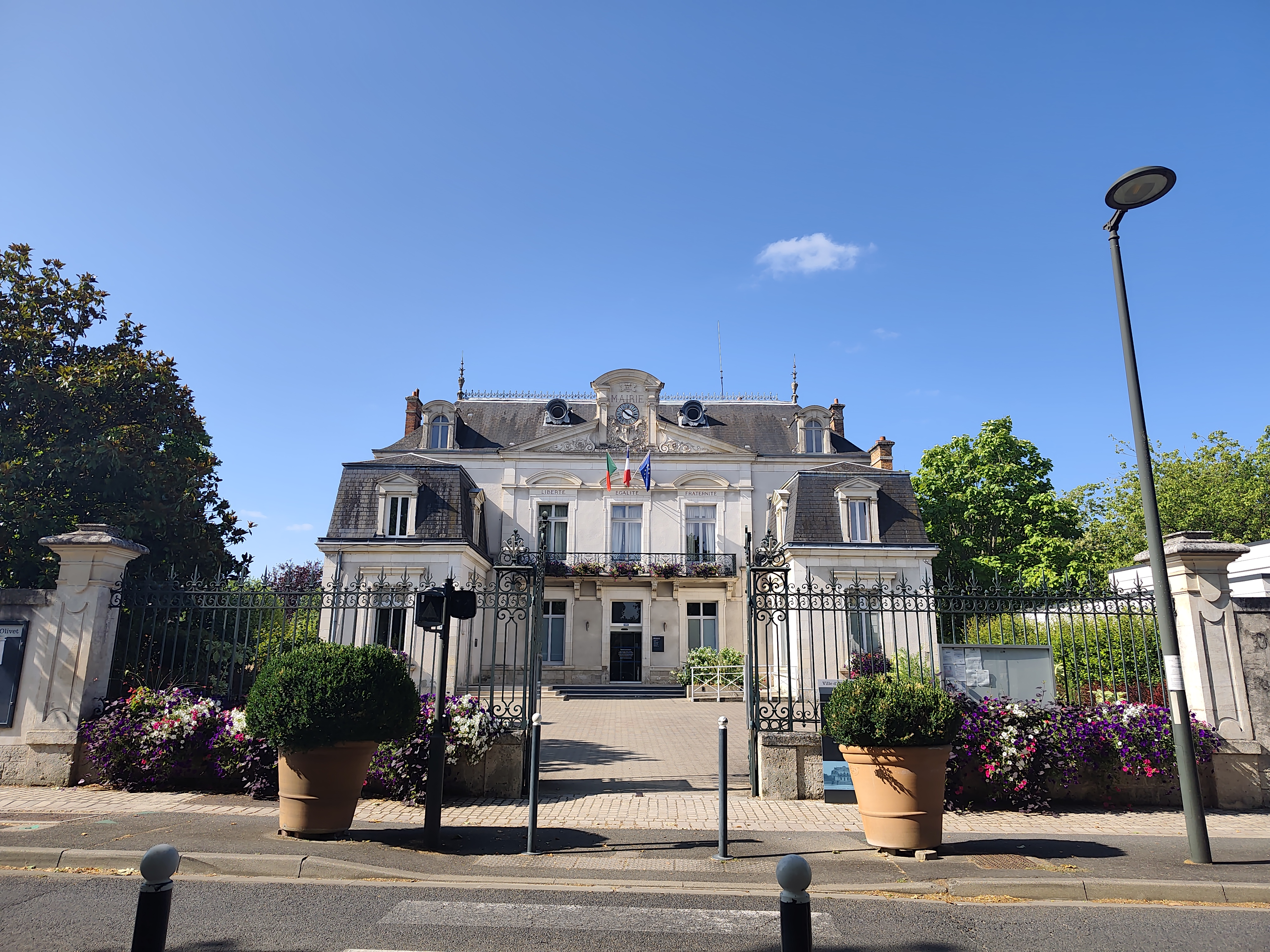
- The main frontage of the Hôtel de Ville in July 2026
- Interactive map of the Hôtel de Ville area

General information
- Type: City hall
- Architectural style: Neoclassical style
- Location: Olivet, France
- Coordinates: 47.8652°N 1.8974°E
- Completed: 1887

The Hôtel de Ville (French pronunciation: [otɛl də vil], City Hall) is a municipal building in Olivet, Loiret, in north-central France, standing on Rue du Général de Gaulle.

== History ==
Following the French Revolution, the town council initially met in a café on the main street before establishing an office in the local clergy house. This arrangement continued until May 1822, when the council acquired a property know as Maison de la Petite Borde on the south side of Route de Saint-Hilaire (now Rue du Général de Gaulle). The council started meeting there on a regular basis from 1854 and additional buildings were subsequently established in the grounds to accommodate firefighting equipment and petty criminals who had been detained.

In September 1884, following significant population growth, the council led by the mayor, Rodolphe Richard Bertrand, decided to demolish the old building and to commission a new building on the same site. The foundation stone was laid by Bertrand in October 1886. The new building was designed in the neoclassical style, built in ashlar stone and was officially opened by the prefect of Loiret, Henri Boegner, on 14 July 1887.

The design involved a symmetrical main frontage of five bays facing onto the street, with the end bays projected forward as pavilions. The central section of three bays featured a square-headed doorway, flanked by a pair of cross-windows on the ground floor, and three French doors with segmental-shaped pediments and a wide iron balcony on the first floor. The central section was flanked by full-height pilasters supporting a pediment with fine carvings in the tympanum. There was also an aedicula, which was later replaced by a clock, above the pediment. The end bays were fenestrated by cross-windows on the ground floor and by dormer windows at attic level. Internally, the principal room was the Salle des Mariages et du Conseil Municipal (weddings and council chamber).

On 21 August 1944, during the Second World War, two members of the French Resistance, Marcel Belot and André Guyon, were captured by German forces in front of the town hall and subsequently shot as they tried to escape. This was less than two weeks before the liberation of the town by the 137th Infantry Regiment, part of the 3rd United States Army, under Lieutenant General George S. Patton, on 3 September 1944.

In July 1987, the mayor, Monique Faller, led festivities to celebrate the centenary of the opening of the town hall. A major programme of refurbishment works costing €340,000 was completed in 2016. The works included the restoration of the painted ceiling in the weddings and council chamber.
