= Saint-Pryvé-Saint-Mesmin =

- Commune
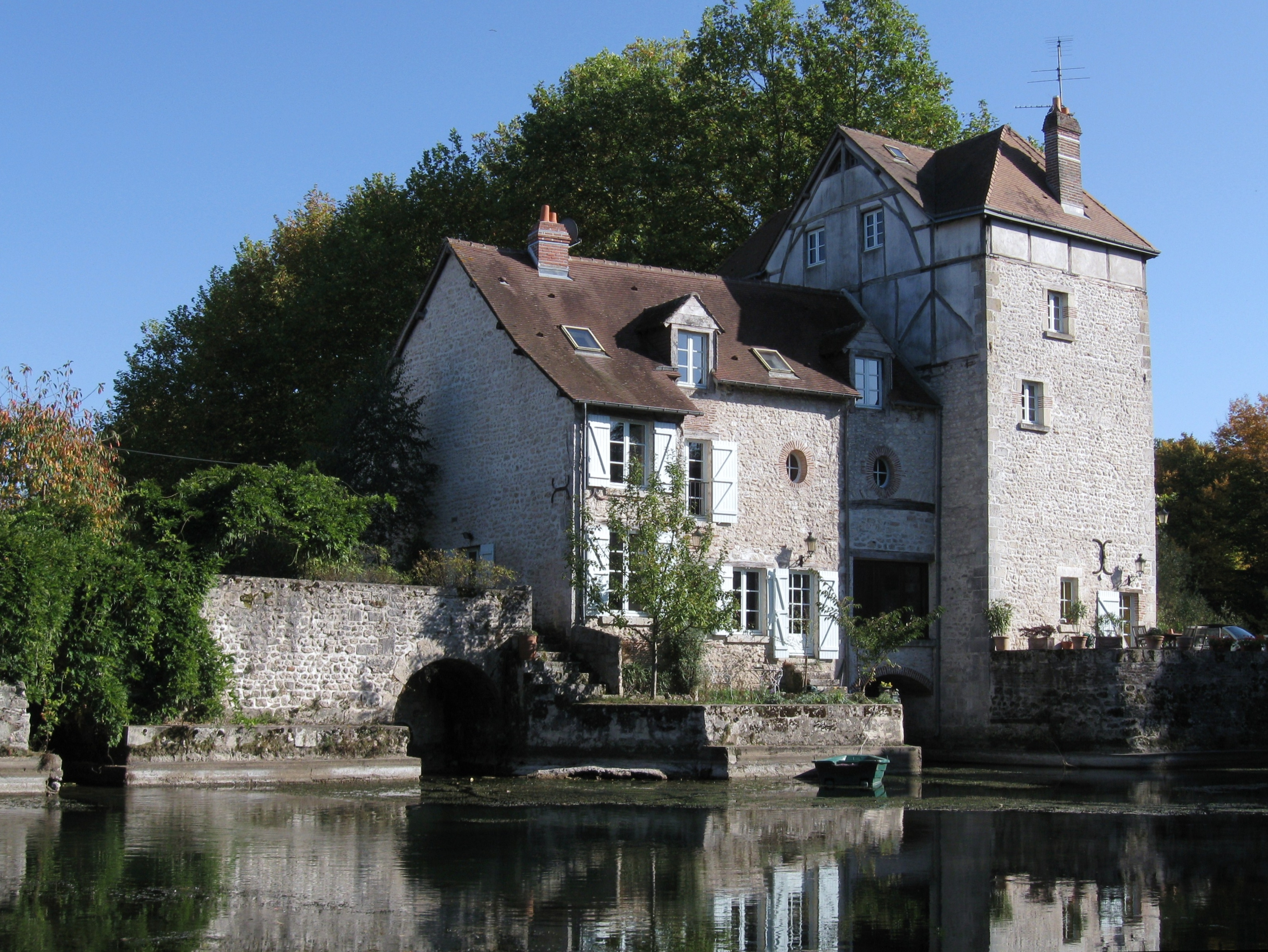
- Old mill on the Loire
- Location of Saint-Pryvé-Saint-Mesmin
- Location within France Location within Centre-Val de Loire
- Coordinates: 47°52′54″N 1°52′07″E
- Country: France
- Region: Centre-Val de Loire
- Department: Loiret
- Arrondissement: Orléans
- Canton: Olivet
- Intercommunality: Orléans Métropole

Government
  - Mayor (2020–2026): Thierry Cousin
- Area^{1}: 8.87 km^{2} (3.42 sq mi)
- Highest elevation: 99 m (325 ft)
- Lowest elevation: 87 m (285 ft)
- Population (2023): 6,256
  - Density: 705/km^{2} (1,830/sq mi)
- Time zone: UTC+01:00 (CET)
  - Summer (DST): UTC+02:00 (CEST)
- INSEE/Postal code: 45298 /45750
- ^{1} French Land Register data, which excludes lakes, ponds, glaciers > 1 km^{2} (0.386 sq mi or 247 acres) and river estuaries.

Saint-Pryvé-Saint-Mesmin (French pronunciation: [sɛ̃ pʁive sɛ̃ mɛmɛ̃]) is a commune in the Loiret department in north-central France.

== Population ==
Historical population
Year	Pop.	±% p.a.
1968	2,168	—
1975	2,871	+4.09%
1982	3,150	+1.33%
1990	5,463	+7.12%
1999	5,609	+0.29%
2007	5,318	−0.66%
2012	5,223	−0.36%
2017	5,803	+2.13%
2023	6,256	+1.26%
Source: INSEE

== See also ==
- Communes of the Loiret department
