= Pascal Ickx =

Belgian racing driver

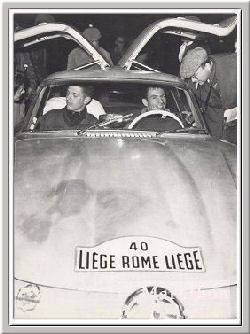
- Ickx at the Liège-Rome-Liège c.1959
- Born: 30 March 1937 (age 89); Lubbeek, Belgium
- Occupations: Pilot; racing driver; journalist
- Spouse: Ornella Spinzze (m. 1964)
- Relatives: Jacky Ickx (brother)

European Rally Championship
- Teams: Mercedes-Benz
- Starts: 6
- Best finish: 5th in 1962

Pascal Ickx (born March 30, 1937, in Lubbeek) is a Belgian former racing driver that competed on circuits for Grand Touring sports cars in the 1960s.

He is the son of the gentleman-driver and journalist Jacques Ickx, and the older brother of Jacky Ickx.

== Racing career ==
Pascal Ickx's first appearance in racing came in the late 1950s where he made an appearance in the 1959 Liège-Rome-Liège driving a Saab. The following year in 1960, he would appear in the Liège-Rome-Liège again driving a BMW 700. That same year, he would drive in the 12 Hours of Huy finishing 32nd. He also made several appearances in World Rally Cars, most notably the ADAC Rallye Tour d'Europe in 1963 driving a Fiat 2300.

== Racing record ==
=== Career summary ===
- Liège-Rome-Liège, DNF, 1959
- Liège-Rome-Liège, DNF, 1960
- 12 Hours of Huy, 32nd, 1960
- Tour de France Automobile, 11th, 1962
- Liège-Sofia-Liège, DNF, 1962
- Coupe des Alpes, DNF, 1962
- Rally Acropolis, 5th, 1962
- ADAC Rallye Tour d'Europe, 1963
- Tour de France Automobile, DNF, 1963
- Int. AvD-Rallye Wiesbaden Deutschlandrallye, DNF, 1963
- Rallye International des Routes du Nord, 1st (GT Class), 1963
- Internationale Tulpenrallyem, 11th, 1965

== Other ventures ==
He became a full-time journalist in the mid-1960s after retiring from racing. He used to serve as a reserve officer in the Belgian Army.

== Personal life ==
Ickx married to Ornella Spinzze in Turin, Italy in 1964.
