= 1981 Paris–Dakar Rally =

Off-road motorsport event in France and Africa

← Previous event	Next event →
- Host country: France; Algeria; Mali; Upper Volta; Ivory Coast; Senegal

1981 Dakar Rally also known as the 1981 Paris–Dakar Rally was the 3rd running of the Dakar Rally event. The car class was won by René Metge and Bernard Giroux. The motorcycle class was won by Hubert Auriol.

== Cars ==
Year	1st		2nd		3rd	
Year	Driver	Car	Driver	Car	Driver	Car
1981	(France) René Metge	Range Rover V8	(France) Hervé Cotel	Buggy Cotel	(France) Jean-Claude Briavoine	Lada Niva

== Stages ==
Stage	Date	From	To	Total (km)
1	1 January	(France) Paris	(France) Olivet	approx 120
2	2 January	(France) Olivet	(France) Sète	approx 625
	3 January	Transportation to Africa		
3	4 January	(Algeria) Algiers	(Algeria) Moudjbara	300
4	5 January	(Algeria) Moudjbara	(Algeria) Bordj Omar Driss	949
5	6 January	(Algeria) Bordj Omar Driss	(Algeria) Tit	605
6	7 January	(Algeria) Tit	(Algeria) Timeaouine	540
7	8 January	(Algeria) Timeaouine	(Mali) Gao	740
	9 January	Rest day in Gao		
8	10 January	(Mali) Gao	(Mali) Tombouctou	412
9	11 January	(Mali) Tombouctou	(Mali) Niono	570
10	12 January	(Mali) Niono	(Republic of Upper Volta) Bobo-Dioulasso	1080
11	13 January	(Republic of Upper Volta) Bobo-Dioulasso	(Ivory Coast) Bouna	828
12	14 January	(Ivory Coast) Bouna	(Ivory Coast) Korhogo	326
13	15 January	(Ivory Coast) Korhogo	(Mali) Kolokani	310
	16 January	Rest day in Kolokani		
14	17 January	(Mali) Kolokani	(Mali) Nioro du Sahel	297
15	18 January	(Mali) Nioro du Sahel	(Senegal) Bakel	325
16	19 January	(Senegal) Bakel	(Senegal) Louga	143
17	20 January	(Senegal) Louga	(Senegal) Dakar	96
