= Saint-Hilaire-Saint-Mesmin =

- Commune
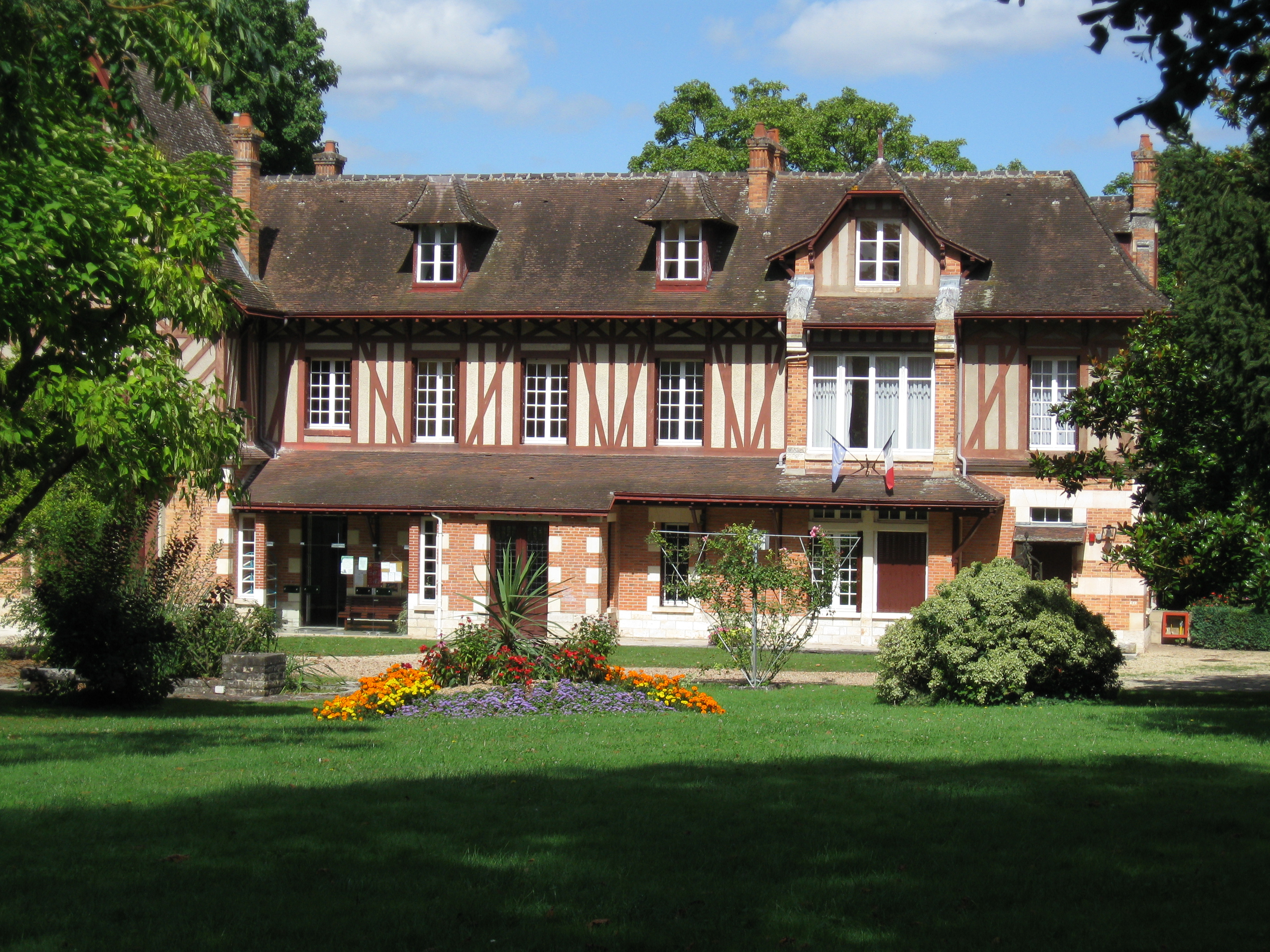
- Town hall

- Coat of arms
- Location of Saint-Hilaire-Saint-Mesmin
- Location within France Location within Centre-Val de Loire
- Coordinates: 47°51′59″N 1°50′09″E
- Country: France
- Region: Centre-Val de Loire
- Department: Loiret
- Arrondissement: Orléans
- Canton: Olivet
- Intercommunality: Orléans Métropole

Government
  - Mayor (2020–2026): Stéphane Chouin
- Area^{1}: 14.12 km^{2} (5.45 sq mi)
- Highest elevation: 105 m (344 ft)
- Lowest elevation: 87 m (285 ft)
- Population (2023): 3,261
  - Density: 230.9/km^{2} (598.2/sq mi)
- Time zone: UTC+01:00 (CET)
  - Summer (DST): UTC+02:00 (CEST)
- INSEE/Postal code: 45282 /45160
- ^{1} French Land Register data, which excludes lakes, ponds, glaciers > 1 km^{2} (0.386 sq mi or 247 acres) and river estuaries.

Saint-Hilaire-Saint-Mesmin (French pronunciation: [sɛ̃.t‿ilɛʁ sɛ̃ mɛmɛ̃]) is a commune in the Loiret department in north-central France.

== Population ==
Historical population
Year	Pop.	±% p.a.
1968	1,623	—
1975	1,835	+1.77%
1982	1,775	−0.47%
1990	2,025	+1.66%
1999	2,353	+1.68%
2007	2,663	+1.56%
2012	2,898	+1.71%
2017	3,040	+0.96%
2023	3,261	+1.18%
Source: INSEE

== See also ==
- Communes of the Loiret department
