= Olivet, Loiret =

Olivet
- Commune
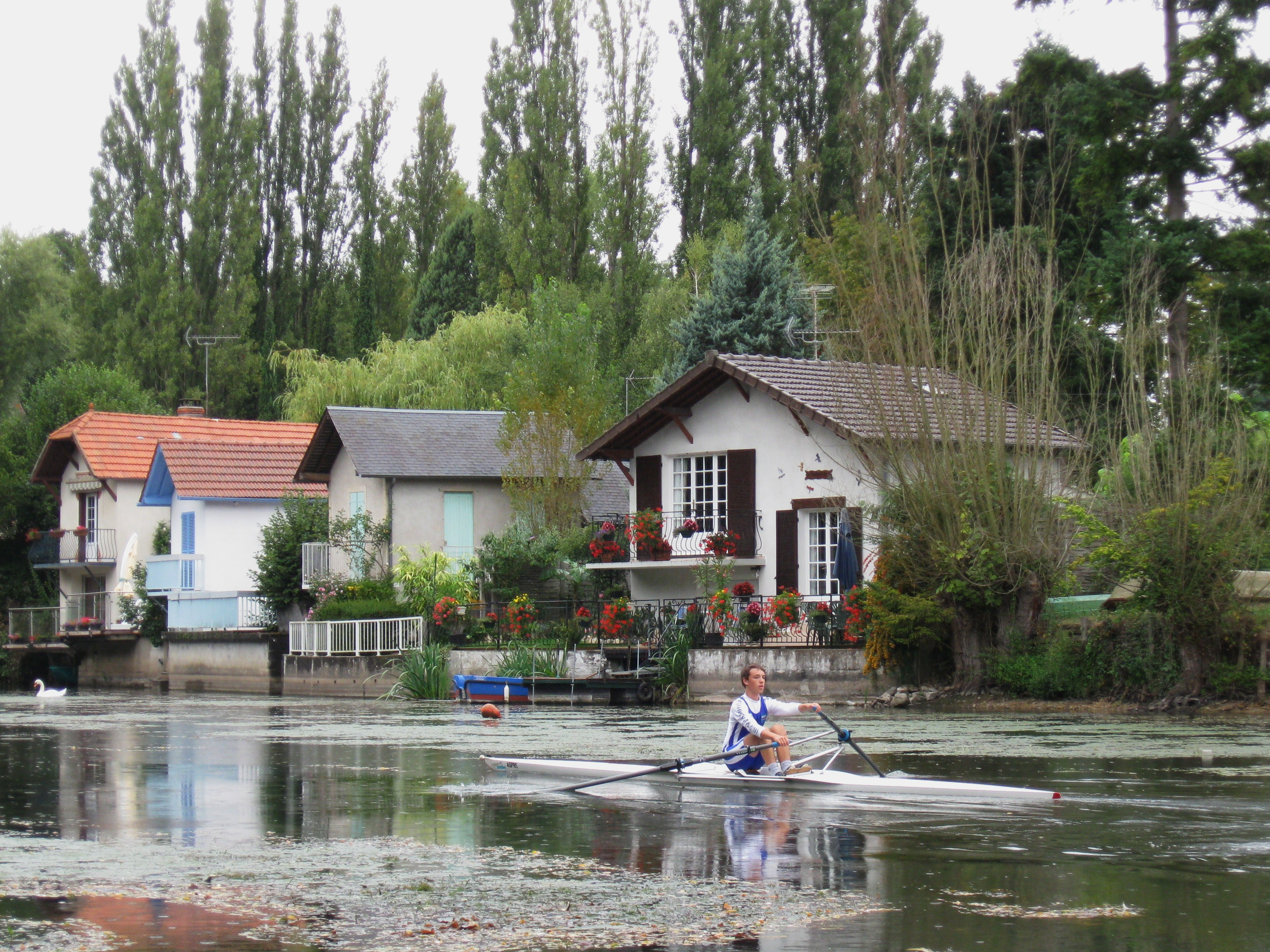
- Banks of the Loiret at Olivet

- Coat of arms
- Location of Olivet
- Location within France Location within Centre-Val de Loire
- Coordinates: 47°51′50″N 1°54′02″E
- Country: France
- Region: Centre-Val de Loire
- Department: Loiret
- Arrondissement: Orléans
- Canton: Olivet
- Intercommunality: Orléans Métropole

Government
  - Mayor (2020–2026): Matthieu Schlesinger
- Area^{1}: 23.39 km^{2} (9.03 sq mi)
- Highest elevation: 109 m (358 ft)
- Lowest elevation: 89 m (292 ft)
- Population (2023): 23,507
  - Density: 1,005/km^{2} (2,603/sq mi)
- Time zone: UTC+01:00 (CET)
  - Summer (DST): UTC+02:00 (CEST)
- INSEE/Postal code: 45232 /45160
- Website: www.ville-olivet.fr
- ^{1} French Land Register data, which excludes lakes, ponds, glaciers > 1 km^{2} (0.386 sq mi or 247 acres) and river estuaries.

Olivet (French pronunciation: [ɔlivɛ], [ɔlive]) is a commune in the department of Loiret, north-central France.

== Geography ==
Olivet is located in the northern bend of the Loire, which crosses from east to west. Olivet belongs to the Loire Valley sector between Sully-sur-Loire and Chalonnes-sur-Loire, which was in 2000 inscribed by UNESCO as a World Heritage Site.

Olivet is 120 km south-south-west of Paris. Olivet is bordered to the north by Orléans and to the south by the Sologne.

Olivet is crossed by the Loiret, a 13 km long river which is both a tributary and a resurgence of the Loire.

== History ==
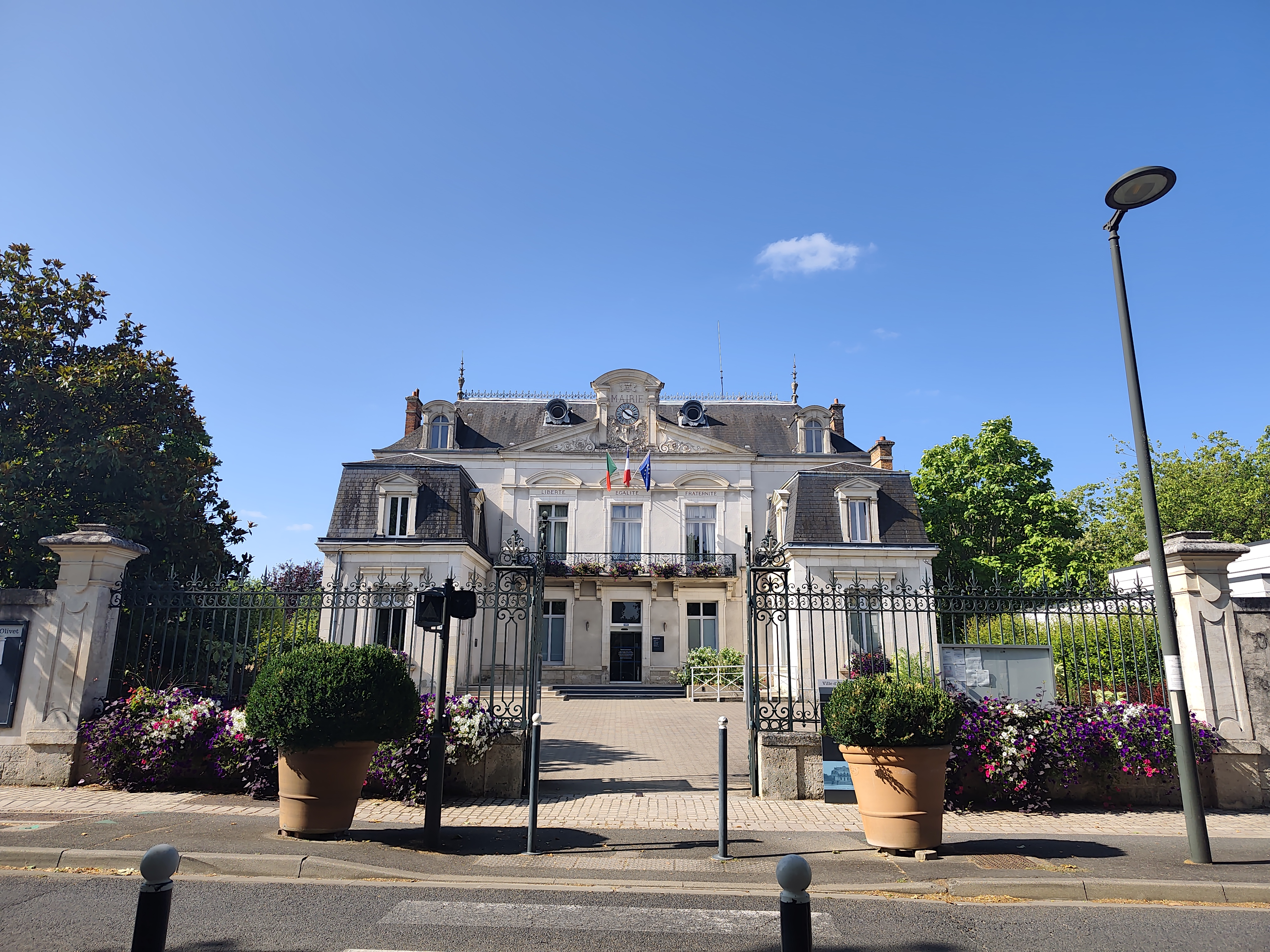
The Hôtel de Ville

The first traces of inhabitants belong to the Merovingian era. The water mills along the river were built by monks during the tenth century.

The first name of the village, during the eleventh century, was Saint Martin du Loiret. The name Olivet comes probably from Mount of olives.

The village suffered severe destructions during the Hundred Years' War, especially during the Siege of Orléans.

During the nineteenth century the river sides became a resort. Most of the surface was still devoted to agriculture, specialised in flowers, vegetable and fruits.

The Hôtel de Ville was completed in 1887.

Nowadays Olivet is a growing city of more than 20,000 inhabitants.

== Population ==
Historical population

Year	Pop.	±% p.a.
1793	3,057	—
1800	3,250	+0.88%
1806	3,260	+0.05%
1821	3,181	−0.16%
1831	3,252	+0.22%
1836	3,386	+0.81%
1841	3,363	−0.14%
1846	3,368	+0.03%
1851	3,399	+0.18%
1856	3,478	+0.46%
1861	3,518	+0.23%
1866	3,608	+0.51%
1872	3,478	−0.61%
1876	3,663	+1.30%
1881	3,723	+0.33%
1886	3,919	+1.03%
1891	3,705	−1.12%
1896	3,602	−0.56%
1901	3,668	+0.36%

Year	Pop.	±% p.a.
1906	3,780	+0.60%
1911	3,770	−0.05%
1921	3,697	−0.20%
1926	3,773	+0.41%
1931	3,833	+0.32%
1936	4,050	+1.11%
1946	4,816	+1.75%
1954	5,630	+1.97%
1962	7,350	+3.39%
1968	7,860	+1.12%
1975	11,568	+5.68%
1982	13,629	+2.37%
1990	17,572	+3.23%
1999	19,195	+0.99%
2007	20,143	+0.60%
2012	19,807	−0.34%
2017	21,951	+2.08%
2023	23,507	+1.15%

Source: EHESS and INSEE (1968-2023)

== Places of interest ==
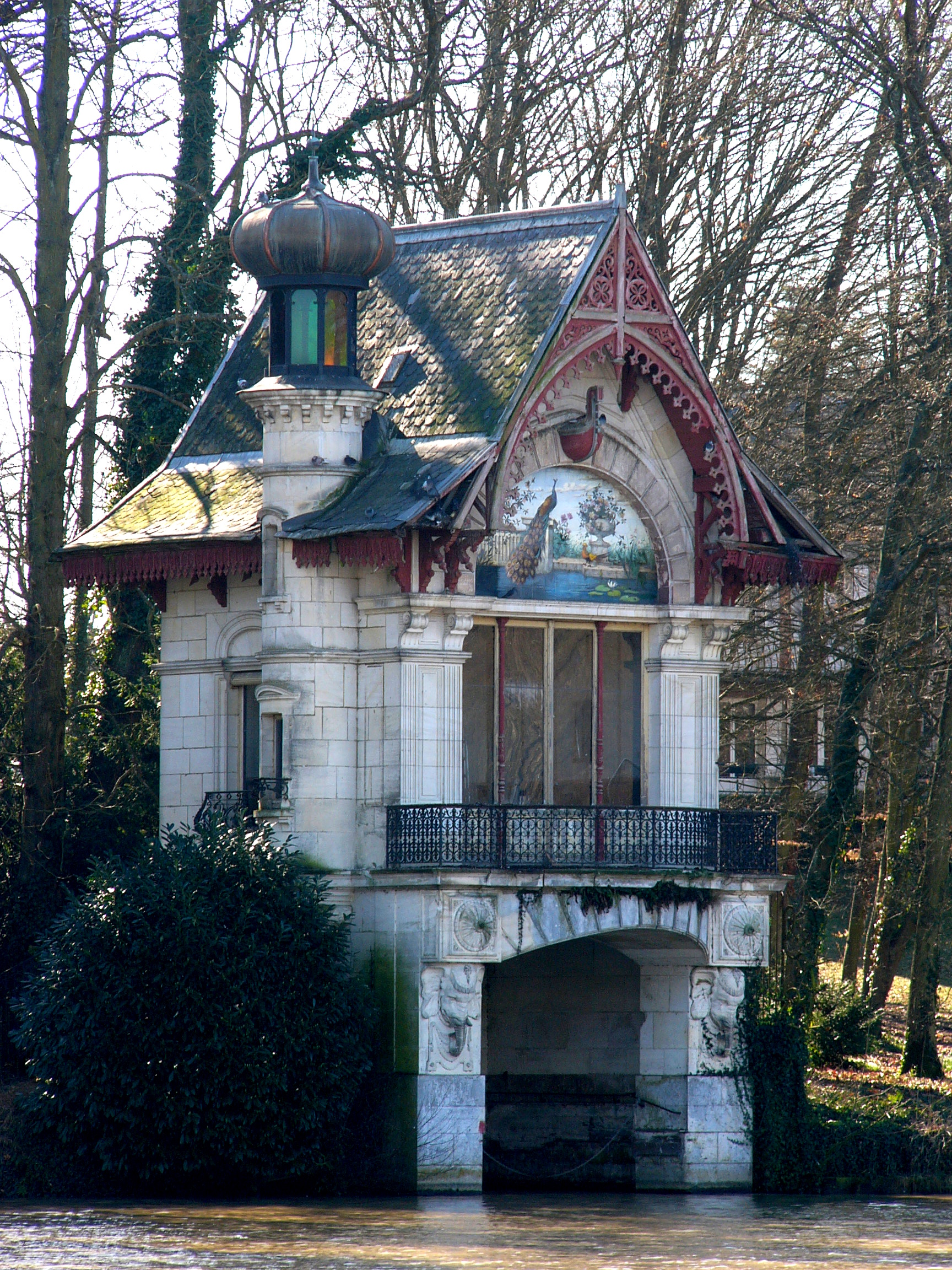
A typical boathouse

The peaceful river Loiret, surrounded by trees and home of numerous swans, offers pleasant public walks. They show glimpses of water mills, old castles, guinguettes and boat garages.

On the north side of the main bridge, the Horloge fleurie is a giant clock on a flowery slope.

The Eglise Saint Martin is a historical monument whose building began in the thirteenth century.

== Gastronomy ==
- Olivet, a cheese often covered with ashes, hay or plane leaves
- poire d'Olivet, a pear liquor with a whole pear inside the bottle

== People ==
- Gentien Hervet (1499–1584), writer and translator
- Gaston d'Illiers (1876–1932), sculptor
- Louis d'Illiers (1880–1953), writer
- Jules-Marie Simon (1871–1970), writer
- Isidore Bernhart (1898–1976), pataphysician
- Pierre Michon (1945- ), writer

== See also ==
- Communes of the Loiret department
- History of the Loiret
