= La Source, Orléans =

Neighborhood in Orléans

La Source
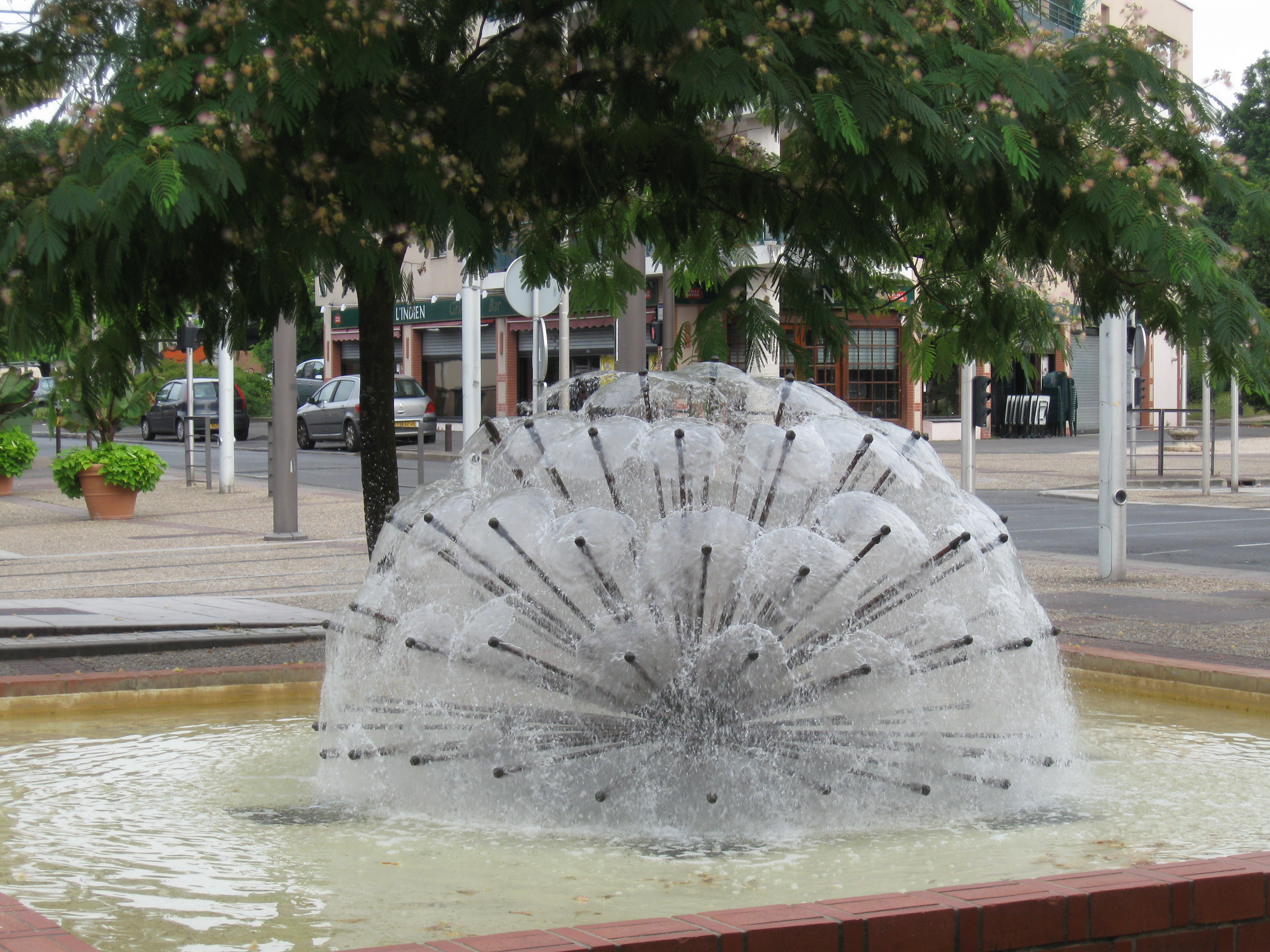
- Indigenous People's Square Fountain (Urban Center of La Source)
- Interactive map of La Source
- Postal code: 45100

The neighborhood La Source (French pronunciation: [la suʁs]) is one of the twelve neighborhoods of the French commune of Orléans, a city located in the Loiret department in the Centre-Val de Loire region.

It is the largest neighborhood in Orléans, where the most important places, the university and the floral park, are surrounded by numerous residences and businesses.

== Etymology ==
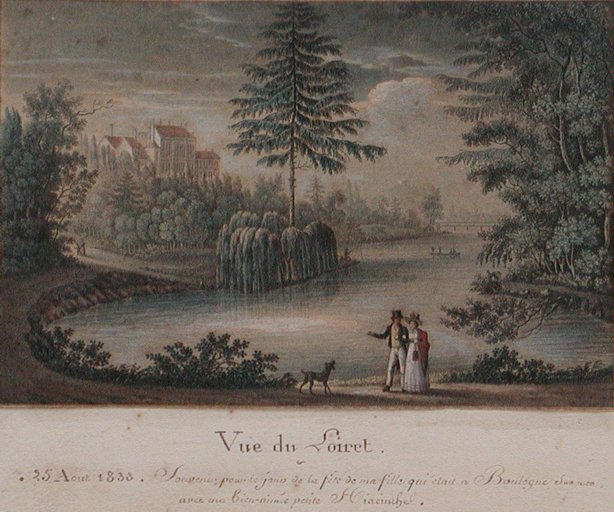
Print depicting the source of the Loiret, known as the 'Bouillon,' in 1833.

The neighborhood takes its name from the "Bouillon," the source of the Loiret, a resurgence of the Loire, which appeared in 1672.

== History ==
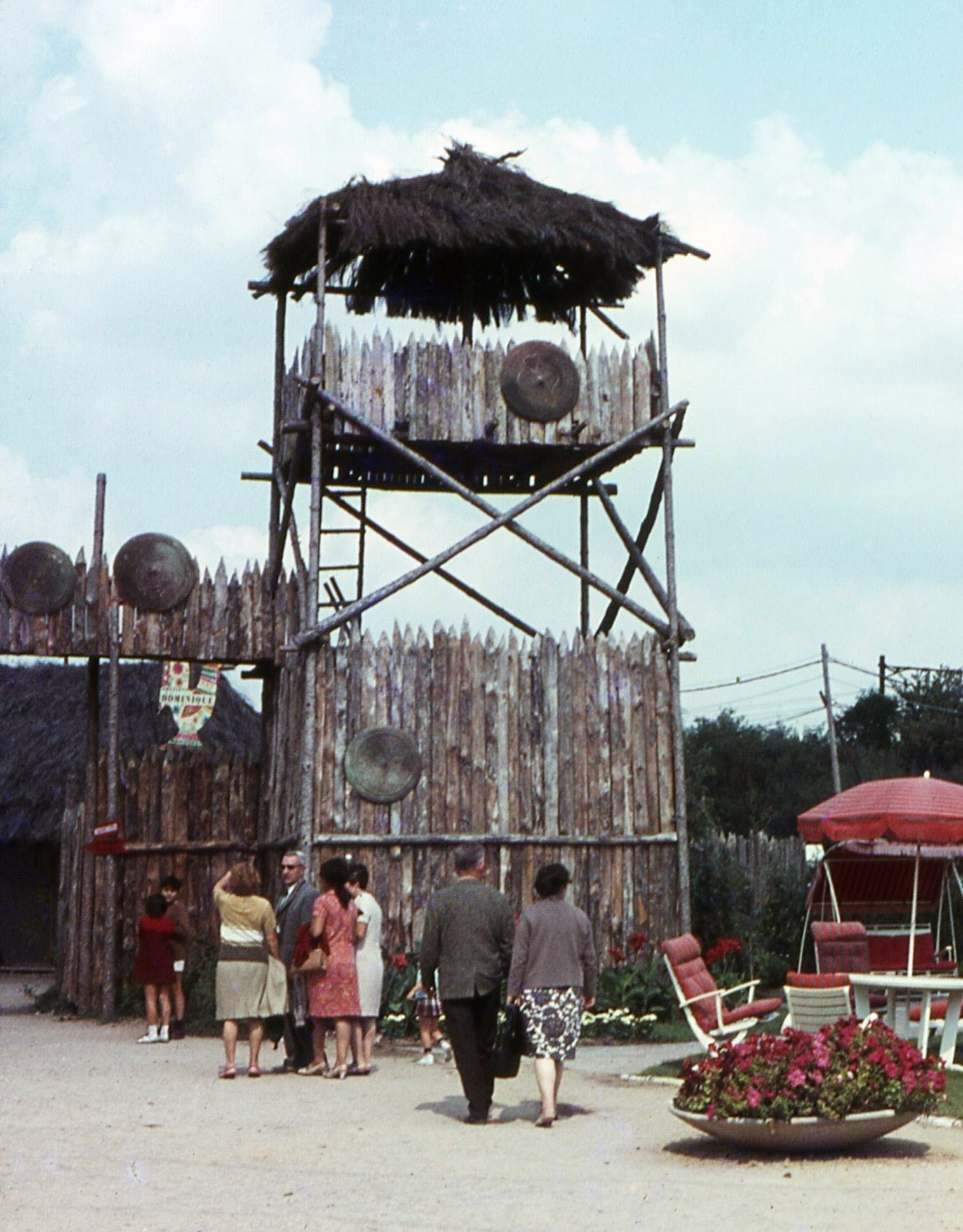
Entrance to the reconstructed Gaulish village in 1967 on the occasion of the International Floralies organized at the Floral Park of La Source.

In 1959, the city of Orléans purchased land from the municipality of Saint-Cyr-en-Val to build the La Source neighborhood. The Minister of Reconstruction and Urbanism, Pierre Sudreau, announced the creation of a campus at the La Source site, described by the press of the time as a future "Oxford-on-Loire."

A university scientific college (CSU) affiliated with the Faculty of Sciences of Paris was established at the Château de La Source in 1960.

The construction of the new city of La Source began in 1962 according to the plans of architect Louis Arretche.

Two laboratories of the National Center for Scientific Research (CNRS) were established in 1967 on the Férollerie site: the Center for Molecular biophysics and the Center for the Selection and Breeding of Laboratory Animals. The same year also saw the creation of the University Institute of Technology of Orléans.

In 1968, Voltaire High School was built, and the Geological and Mining Research Bureau (BRGM) was established in the neighborhood.

The Center for Research on High-Temperature Physics (CNRS's own laboratory) moved to La Source in 1969. The last buildings planned in 1962 were completed in 1982.

Decree No. 96-1156 of 26 December 1996, placed the neighborhood on the list of sensitive urban areas (ZUS) and urban revitalization areas (ZRU). In 2015, La Source became a priority neighborhood with the abolition of the ZUS, with 11,284 inhabitants on 72 hectares.

The A tram line in Orléans serves the neighborhood in 2000.

The CNRS laboratory "Molecular Immunology and Embryology" was established in 2001.

In 2002, Orléans-La Source was chosen as a pilot site within the framework of the Social Territory Project. That same year, the Pierre Bonnin Departmental Analysis Laboratory was established on the Châteaubriand site.

A convention with the National Agency for Urban Renewal was signed in 2004 in the presence of Jean-Louis Borloo, then Minister of Employment, Labor and Social Cohesion.

In 2005, Julia Bastide, a 20-year-old IUT student, was shot dead on campus. One of her classmates entered the classroom armed with a .22 caliber rifle purchased online a few months earlier and opened fire three times. He was arrested about forty minutes after the incident. Following three nights of violence, the authorities decided to impose a curfew for minors under 16.

The Minouflet Sports Complex opened its doors in 2006.

The Employment House of the Orléans Basin was established in the former premises of the postal checks in 2007.

The Institute of Earth and Environmental Sciences (ISTE) opened its doors in 2008. On 15 December 2008, Mayor Serge Grouard welcomed Prime Minister François Fillon and three of his ministers, Christine Boutin, Patrick Devedjian, and Fadela Amara, to the La Source neighborhood as part of the ANRU Grand City Project. In December 2008, Serge Moati chose the La Source neighborhood to illustrate a documentary on successful urban renovations.

On 5 March 2009, Minister of Housing Christine Boutin visited the La Source neighborhood to promote her zero-interest loan policy.

On 22 October 2010, the Orléans City Council adopted a resolution regarding the sale protocol of a 2550 m² plot. On it, the new mosque of Orléans-La Source as well as a cultural center will be built.

== Geography ==
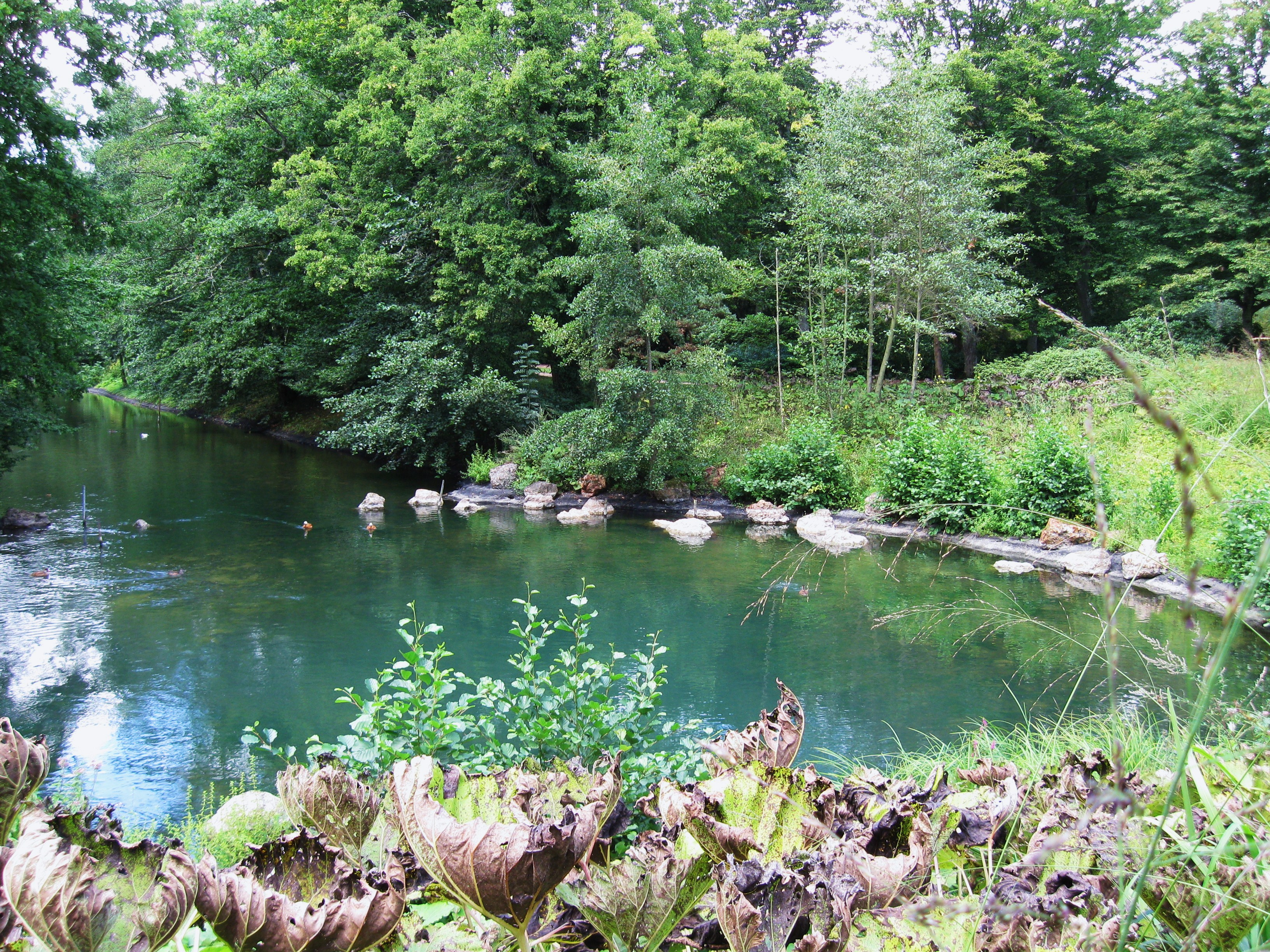
The source of the Loiret (Floral Park of La Source).

Orléans-La Source is located about ten kilometers south of downtown Orléans, south of the Loire and the Saint-Marceau neighborhood, about ten kilometers north of La Ferté-Saint-Aubin. The neighborhood, bordering the municipalities of Saint-Cyr-en-Val, Ardon, and Olivet, is located at the intersection of the natural regions of Sologne and Val de Loire.

It is crossed to the north by the Dhuy, which comes from Saint-Cyr-en-Val to the east and joins the Loiret to the west, in the territory of the municipality of Olivet.

The source of the Loiret is located within the Floral Park.

Two lakes are located in the neighborhood: one in the center of the university campus and the other, to the south, the Lake of the Edge of Sologne located between the departmental road 2020 (formerly national road 20) and George Sand Street.

Green spaces are numerous throughout the neighborhood: in addition to the floral park, we can mention the fir avenue, the campus, and the Concyr wood.

=== Communication routes ===
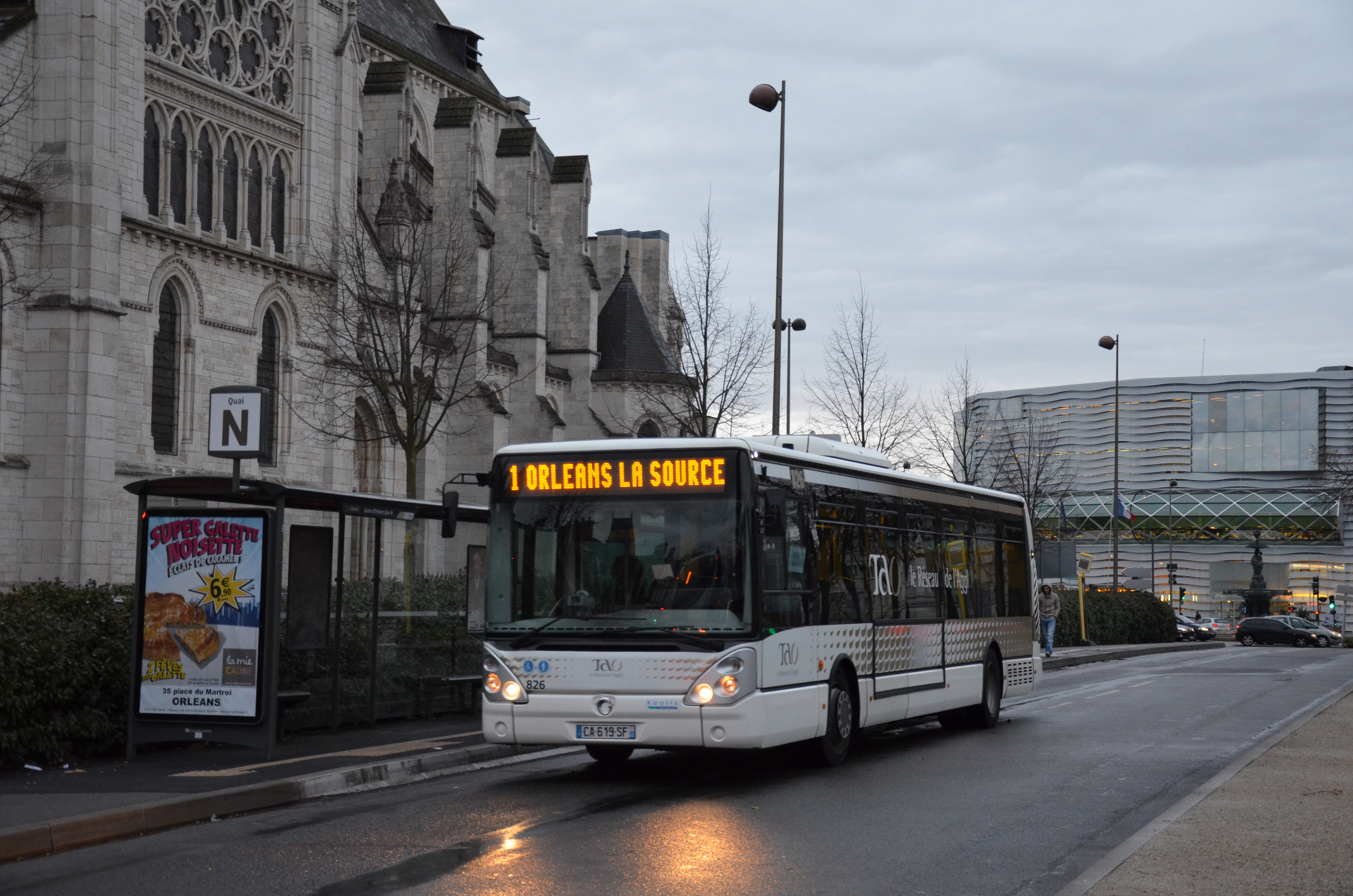
"6 bus lines of the TAO network serve the neighborhood.

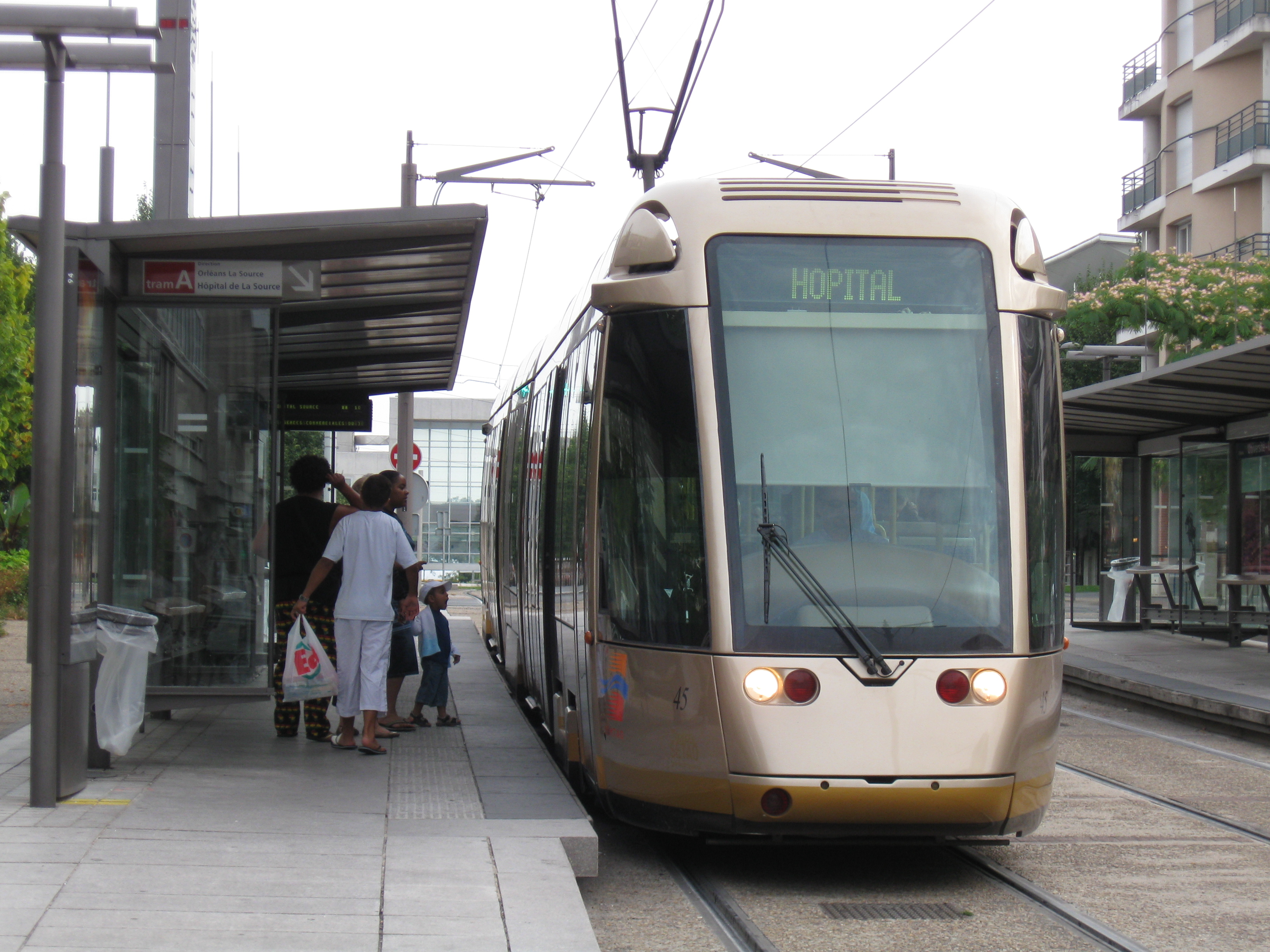
L'Indien station.

The A tram line in Orléans serves the neighborhood at the University, Floral Park, L'Indien, Chèques Postaux, Bolière, Welcome Hospital, and Hospital de la Source stations, the southern terminus of the line.

Parallel to the construction of the new Orléans Regional Hospital Center (CHRO), an additional station called Hospital-Welcome and located at the southern end of Hospital Avenue is set up between the Bolière and Hospital de la Source stations.

The neighborhood is also served by a major public transportation line (TAO): line 1. It is also served by lines 13, 40, 41, 61, and N, as well as Résa'Sud, the TAO on-demand transport service.

The regional interurban transport network, Réseau de mobilité interurbaine (Rémi), crosses the neighborhood with lines 3, 5, 7, 8, and 99 from the former Ulys network. Line 1 from the neighboring department of Eure-et-Loir, from the former Transbeauce network, serves various points of the university.

Departmental roads 2020, 14, and 326 cross the territory of Orléans-La-Source.

An exit from the A71 motorway located in Olivet and the Saint-Cyr-en-Val – La Source station, located in Saint-Cyr-en-Val (on the border with the neighborhood), also provide access to the neighborhood.

=== Urban planning ===
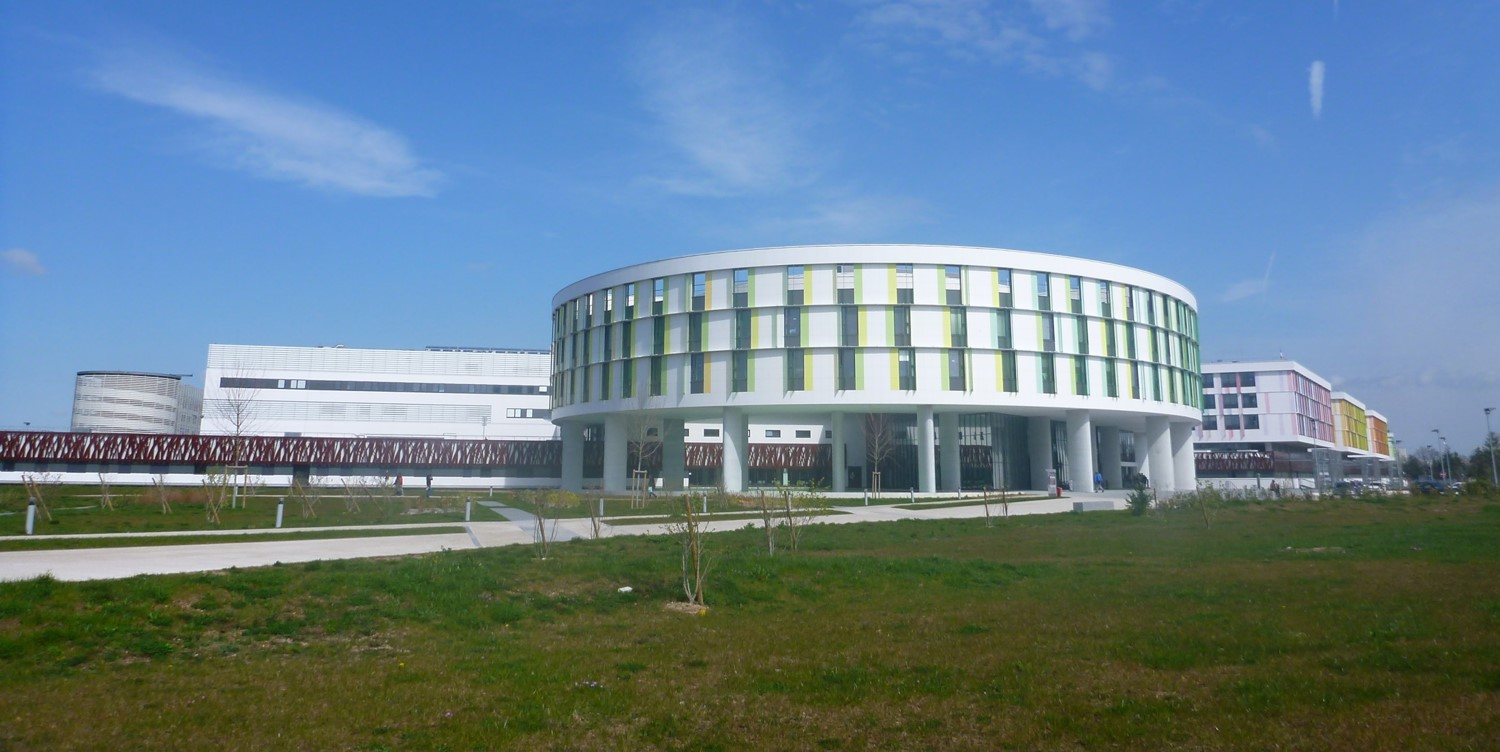
Regional Hospital Center of Orléans.

The neighborhood consists of various large complexes: the floral park, the Source stadium, an activity zone, the Voltaire and Gauguin high schools, the University of Orléans, scientific research centers, and residences.

Housing is mainly divided into two areas:

- In the north, housing is mostly composed of buildings with moderately priced apartments, sometimes with problems inherent to suburbs. In the 2000s, numerous rehabilitation, residentialization, and demolition works were carried out.
- In the south, housing consists of several more upscale residential areas such as the Edge of Sologne, the Fir Avenue, and Est-Poincaré.

On the campus, the university library of sciences designed by architects Pascal Rollet and Florence Lipsky received the Silver T-square award in 2005.

At its origins, Orléans-La Source was intended to be a "pilot city of the 21st century." Its urban planning was designed by architect Louis Arretche from 1962 to 1982. He notably used the concept of "modular pavilion system" designed by Jean Prouvé and designed the city's master plan where "princes will be pedestrians" in a single city for the university and residents, with the concern to preserve as many trees as possible.

Reviewing Louis Arretche's working documents allows for the compilation of all the planned or realized achievements for Orléans-La-Source: a church and a parish center with a detached bell tower (1962, not realized), a set of 1,000 social housing units for the public office of moderate-rent housing (OPHLM) of Orléans in the form of 41 blocks (1963–1964), a set of 160 social housing units for the real estate company for the housing of civil and military officials (CILOF) in the form of six towers (1963–1966), the hospital (1964), the administrative pavilion of SEMEPO, a mixed economy company intended to manage the floral park (1964–1965), a set of 175 housing units in the form of three blocks for the Mixed Economy Company for the construction of the city of Orléans (SEMI) and SACI (1964–1966), the residence "Les Bois de la Source" in the form of a set of three blocks comprising 303 housing units around a garden with an underground parking lot for the French Union of Real Estate (1964–1967), a ground floor shopping center with modular facade for SEMPEL, a mixed economy company for the equipment of Loiret (1964–1968), a postal check sorting center and swimming pool for the Ministry of Posts and Telecommunications (PTT), the regional directorate of Orléans and the sports association of PTT (1964–1973), groups of individual houses (including 100 houses for La Ruche ouvrière in 1965, 220 houses for SEMI from 1966 to 1968, and 410 houses for the real estate company L'Orée de Sologne in 1973), a greenhouse-restaurant in the floral park for SEMEPO (1966–1967), an office building for INSEE (1968–1972), the post office hotel (1969–1977), school group No. 7 comprising five kindergarten classes and ten primary classes in adjoining modules (1973–1982), the Bolière shopping center for SEMPEL (1974–1976), a set of 727 housing units in the form of blocks arranged in a square on the slab of the urban center (1974–1977), four buildings comprising 87 housing units, around two office buildings housing a police station and a town hall annex (1978–1980).

In 2004, given the multiple difficulties encountered in the north of the neighborhood, Orléans-La Source was included in an urban renewal project signed with the National Agency for Urban Renewal (ANRU). It includes the demolition of 589 social housing units, the rehabilitation of 1,200 social housing units, the on-site reconstruction of 170 housing units and off-site reconstruction of 419 social housing units. In addition, the construction of a media library and the Minouflet sports complex, the development of public spaces, and the restructuring of roads are also included in the program.

== Administration ==
Since 2015, the Orléans-La Source neighborhood is half part of the La Ferté-Saint-Aubin canton and half part of the Orléans-2 Canton; it also has a neighborhood town hall.

== Demographics ==
- 1968: 3,681
- 1975: 17,013
- 1990: 21,968
- 1999: 21,370
- 2009: 22,000

== Education ==
The Orléans-La Source neighborhood is located in the Orléans-Tours academy and in the Orléans-South district. It has a large number of educational institutions: nine nursery schools, seven elementary schools, one primary school (nursery & elementary), one specialized and elementary school, two colleges, and two high schools.

- Nursery schools: Romain-Rolland, Louis-Pasteur, Antoine-Lavoisier, Denis-Diderot, Henri-Poincaré, Gaston-Galloux, René-Guy-Cadou, Jolibois, Les Guernazelles.
- Elementary schools: Romain-Rolland, Louis-Pasteur, Antoine-Lavoisier, Denis-Diderot, Henri-Poincaré, Gaston-Galloux, Les Guernazelles.
- Primary school: Pauline Kergomard.
- Specialized and elementary school: René-Guy-Cadou. This school welcomes children with disabilities (specific language disorders, hearing impairment, and visual impairment) from the Loiret department as well as other departments of the academy, as well as children from the school area distributed in classes from Cp to Cm2. The objective of this school is the inclusion of children with disabilities in elementary classes.
- Alain-Fournier and Montesquieu colleges;
- Voltaire high school built in 1968 by architects Andrault and Parat;
- Paul-Gauguin vocational high school;
- School of adaptation: accommodation center for travelers.

== University and research ==
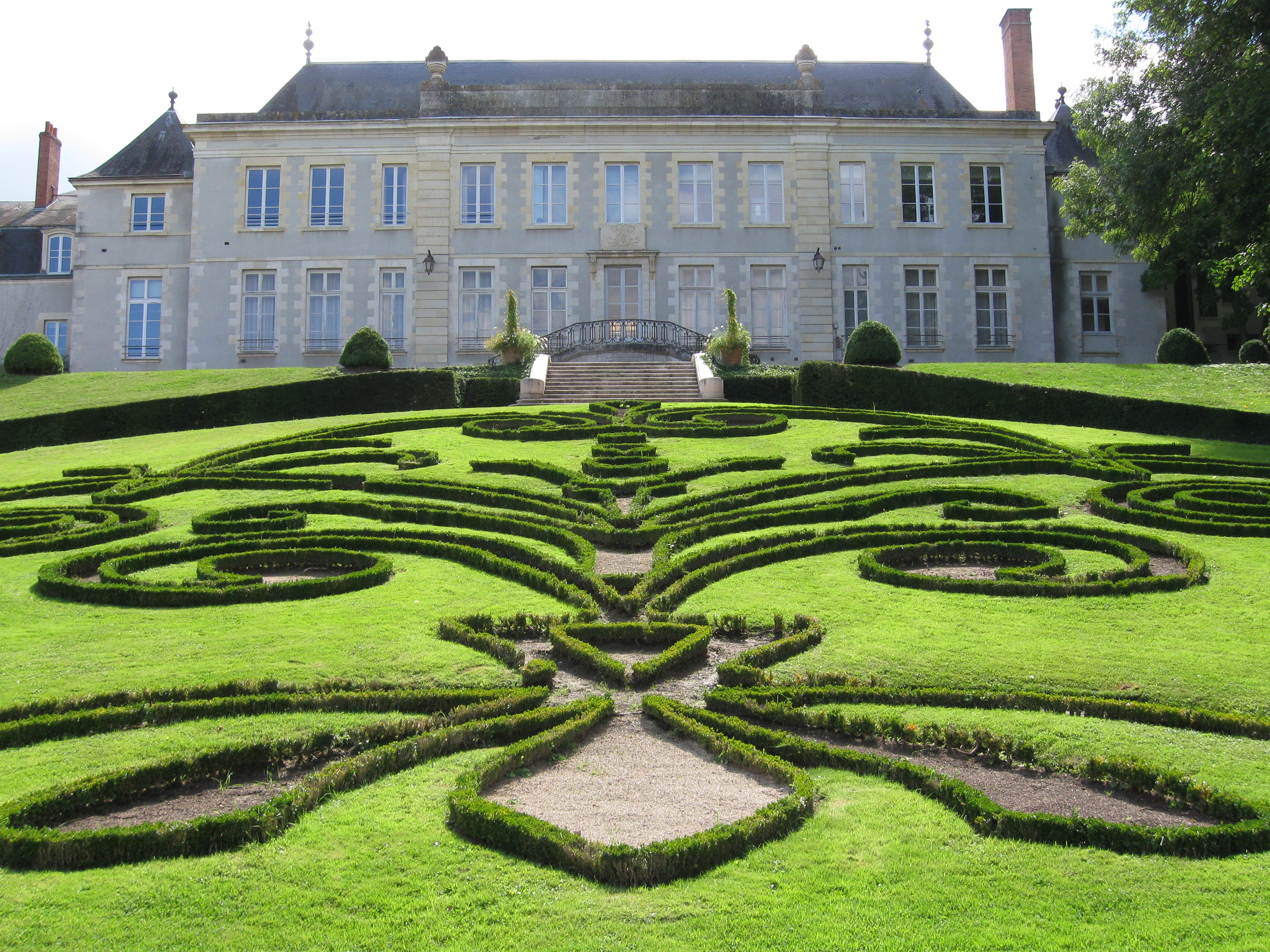
The Château de la Source, seat of the presidency of the University of Orléans.

The University of Orléans is located in the La Source neighborhood as well as an engineering school, Polytech'Orléans.

Several scientific research organizations have significant laboratories and sites in the neighborhood, including those of the National Center for Scientific Research (CNRS), the national scientific and technical center of the Bureau of Geological and Mining Research (BRGM), and the Orleans center of the Institute of Research for Development (IRD, formerly ORSTOM).

== Infrastructure ==
The neighborhood has several infrastructures for local, regional, or national purposes.

=== Sports ===
- Stadiums of La Source and Concyr;
- Minouflet Sports Complex;
- Matthieu-Jarry aquatic complex;
- Mathieu-Apcher Thai boxing hall;
- Gilbert-Cathelinau, La Bolière, André-Gresle, Romain-Rolland gymnasia;
- Patrick-Jenté dojo and Marcel-Cerdan boxing hall.

=== Culture ===
- Gérard-Philipe Theater;
- Maurice-Genevoix Media Library.

=== Others ===
- New Orleans Hospital (NHO);
- Floral Park of La Source;
- France 3 Center-Val de Loire station;
- Postal check center, inaugurated in 1968 and built by Louis Arretche and Forestier;
- EDF computer center (now disused), built by the Atelier de Montrouge (1967–1968);
- Cyclotron of the CNRS Center for Studies and Research by Irradiation.
