= Georges Chapouthier =

French neuroscientist and philosopher

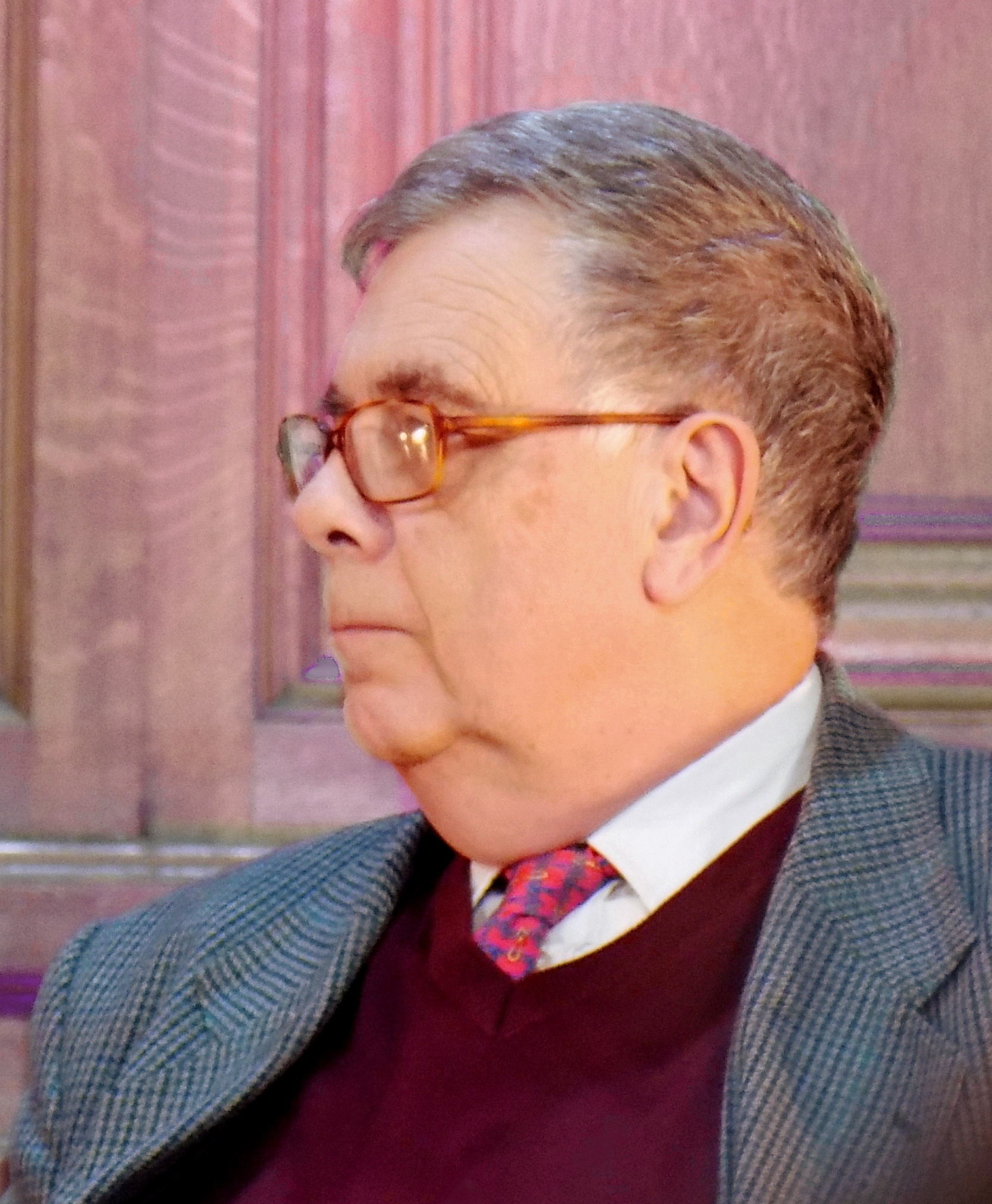
- Georges Chapouthier, 2015
- Born: 27 March 1945 (age 81); Libourne, France
- Citizenship: French
- Education: University of Strasbourg, Jean Moulin University Lyon 3
- Scientific career
- Fields: Neuroscience, pharmacology, philosophy
- Workplaces: French National Centre for Scientific Research

Georges Chapouthier (born 27 March 1945 in Libourne) is a French neuroscientist and philosopher.

== Biography ==
Georges Chapouthier is the son of Odette Mazaubert and Fernand Chapouthier (1899–1953). Fernand Chapouthier was a classicist and archeologist who was deputy director of the Ecole normale supérieure in Paris. Odette Mazaubert was known under the pseudonym of "Carquelin" for her Saintongeais writings. Chapouthier attended the Lycée Montaigne and the Lycée Louis-le-Grand in Paris. He then followed the "Classes Préparatoires aux Grandes Écoles" at the Lycée Saint-Louis and subsequently enrolled at the Ecole normale supérieure in 1964. Chapouthier then studied biology and philosophy, obtaining a "doctorat d'état" in both (University of Strasbourg, 1973, and Jean Moulin University Lyon 3, 1986, respectively).

During his whole career, Chapouthier has worked for the French National Centre for Scientific Research (CNRS), where he currently has the rank of emeritus research director. His research focuses on the pharmacology of memory and anxiety and on philosophy, especially the relations between humans and animals.

As a philosopher, he was influenced by Louis Bourgey and François Dagognet.

== Publications ==
=== Books ===
- Psychophysiologie - Le système nerveux et le Comportement, G. Chapouthier, M. Kreutzer, C. Menini, Editions Etudes vivantes, Paris, 1980, 192 pp.
- L'inné et l'acquis des structures biologiques, J.J. Matras and G. Chapouthier (eds.), collection "Le Biologiste", Presses Universitaires de France, Paris, 1981, 243 pp, ISBN 978-2-13-037012-3.
- Introduction au fonctionnement du système nerveux (codage et traitement de l'information), G. Chapouthier, J.J. Matras, Editions MEDSI, Paris, 1982, 224 pp, ISBN 978-2-86439-056-5.
- Mémoire et Cerveau - Biologie de l'apprentissage, G. Chapouthier, Collection Science et DEcouvertes, Editions du Rocher, Monaco, 1988, 126 pp, ISBN 978-2-268-00668-0.
- Au bon vouloir de l'homme, l'animal, G. Chapouthier, Editions Denoël, Paris,1990, 260 pp, ISBN 978-2-207-23657-4.
- Les droits de l'animal, G. Chapouthier, Collection "Que sais-je ?", Presses Universitaires de France, Paris, 1992, 125 pp, ISBN 978-2-13-044678-1.(Czech edition : Triton, Prague, 2013, 120 pp, ISBN 978-80-7387-607-4).
- La biologie de la mémoire, G. Chapouthier, Collection "Que sais-je ?", Presses Universitaires de France, Paris, 1994, 125 pp, ISBN 2-13-046261-8.
- Les droits de l'animal aujourd'hui, G. Chapouthier, J.C. Nouët (eds.), Collection "Panoramiques", Editions Arléa-Corlet (Diffusion Le Seuil) and Ligue Française des Droits de l'Animal, Paris, 1997, 244 pp; ISBN 978-2-85480-904-6.
- The Universal Declaration of Animal Rights - Comments and Intentions, G. Chapouthier, J.C. Nouët (eds.), Editions Ligue Française des Droits de l'Animal, Paris, 1998, 92 pp; ISBN 978-2-9512167-0-9.
- L'homme, ce singe en mosaïque, G. Chapouthier, Editions Odile Jacob, Paris, 2001, 211 pp, ISBN 978-2-7381-0977-4.
- Qu'est-ce que l'animal?, G. Chapouthier, Collection "Les petites pommes du savoir", Editions le Pommier, Paris, 2004, 55 pp, ISBN 978-2-7465-0167-6. (Korean edition: Editions Goldenbough, Seoul, South Korea, 2005, 64 pp; Spanish edition:¿Qué es el animal? Tres Cantos, Madrid, 2006, 56 pp, ISBN 978-84-460-2246-6).
- Biologie de la mémoire, G. Chapouthier, Editions Odile Jacob, Paris, 2006, 222 pp, ISBN 978-2-13-046261-3.
- L'être humain, l'animal et la technique, M.-H. Parizeau and G. Chapouthier (eds.), Les Presses de l'Université Laval, Quebec, Canada, 2007, 241 pp, ISBN 978-2-7637-8655-1.
- Plasticity and anxiety, P. Venault and G. Chapouthier (eds.), Hindawi, New York, 2007, ISBN 978-977-5945-99-0.
- La cognition réparée? Perturbations et récupérations des fonctions cognitives, R. Jouvent and G. Chapouthier (eds.), Editions de la Maison des sciences de l'homme, Paris, 2008, 220 pp, ISBN 978-2-7351-1145-9.
- Kant et le chimpanzé - Essai sur l'être humain, la morale et l'art, G. Chapouthier, Editions Belin, Paris, 2009, 144 pp, ISBN 978-2-7011-4698-0.(Spanish edition: Kant y el chimpancé, Proteus, Espana, 2011,148 pp, ISBN 978-84-15-04755-1); Serbian edition: Kant i simpanza, Dereta, Serbia, 2012,154 pp, ISBN 978-86-73-46878-5)
- La création –définitions et défis contemporains, S. Dallet, G. Chapouthier, and E. Noël (eds.), Editions L'Harmattan, 2009, 243 pp, ISBN 978-2-296-10241-5.
- O faut bin rigoler in p'tit! (in Saintongeais), G. Chapouthier, Editions des régionalismes, Monein (France), 2010, 70 pp, ISBN 978-2-84618-663-6.
- L'homme, l'animal et la machine - Perpétuelles redéfinitions, G.Chapouthier, F.Kaplan, CNRS Editions, Paris, 2011, 220 pp, ISBN 978-2-271-07072-2
- La question animale – Entre science, littérature et philosophie, J.P. Engélibert, L. Campos, C. Coquio, G. Chapouthier (editors), Presses Universitaires de Rennes – Espace Mendès France Poitiers, 2011, 307 pp, ISBN 978-2-7535-1291-7
- Que reste-t-il du propre de l'homme ? G. Chapouthier, J.G. Ganascia, L. Naccache, P. Picq, Les Presses de l'ENSTA, Palaiseau (France), 2012, 78 pp, ISBN 978-2-72250-938-2
- Le chercheur et la souris, G.Chapouthier, F.Tristani-Potteaux, CNRS Éditions, Paris, 2013, 208 pp, ISBN 978-2-271-07818-6.
- Mondes mosaïques – Astres, villes, vivant et robots, J. Audouze, G. Chapouthier, D. Laming, P.Y. Oudeyer, CNRS Editions, 2015, 214 pp, ISBN 978-2271-080554
- L'invention de la mémoire, Ecrire, Enregistrer, Numériser, Michel Laguës, Denis Beaudouin, Georges Chapouthier, CNRS Editions, 2017, 384 pp, ISBN 978-2271-089335
- The Mosaic Theory of Natural Complexity: A scientific and philosophical approach [online], G. Chapouthier, Éditions des maisons des sciences de l'homme associées, La Plaine-Saint-Denis (France), Available on the Internet: <https://books.openedition.org/emsha/200> ISBN 978-2821-895744

=== Selected articles ===
- Chapouthier G. (1983), Protein synthesis and memory, in: J.A. Deutsch (Editor), Physiological Basis of Memory, 2nd Edition, Academic Press, New York, Chapter l, pp. 1–47
- Prado De Carvalho, L. P.; Grecksch, G.; Chapouthier, G.; Rossier, J. (1983). "Anxiogenic and non-anxiogenic benzodiazepine antagonists". Nature. 301 (5895): 64–66. Bibcode:1983Natur.301...64D. doi:10.1038/301064a0. PMID 6296684. S2CID 4356900.
- Venault, P.; Chapouthier, G.; Prado De Carvalho, L.; Simiand, J.; Morre, M.; Dodd, R. H.; Rossier, J. (1986). "Benzodiazepine impairs and β-carboline enhances performance in learning and memory tasks". Nature. 321 (6073): 864–6. Bibcode:1986Natur.321..864V. doi:10.1038/321864a0. PMID 3724846. S2CID 4343021.
- Clement, Y.; Chapouthier, G. (1998). "Biological bases of anxiety". Neuroscience & Biobehavioral Reviews. 22 (5): 623–33. doi:10.1016/S0149-7634(97)00058-4. PMID 9662724. S2CID 1175081.
- Chapouthier, G.; Launay, J. M.; Venault, P.; Breton, C.; Roubertoux, P. L.; Crusio, W. E. (1998). "Genetic selection of mouse lines differing in sensitivity to a benzodiazepine receptor inverse agonist". Brain Research. 787 (1): 85–90. doi:10.1016/S0006-8993(97)01483-2. PMID 9518562. S2CID 33697369.
- Chapouthier, G.; Venault, P. (2001). "A pharmacological link between epilepsy and anxiety?". Trends in Pharmacological Sciences. 22 (10): 491–493. doi:10.1016/S0165-6147(00)01807-1. PMID 11583788.
- Chapouthier G., Venault P. (2004), GABA-A Receptor Complex and Memory Processes, Medicin. Chemistry Reviews online, 1, 91-99
- Chapouthier G. (2004), To what extent is moral judgement natural ?, Eur. Review (GB), 12(2), 179-183
- Venault P., Chapouthier G. (2007), From the Behavioral Pharmacology of Beta-Carbolines to Seizures, Anxiety and Memory, TheScientificWorldJournal, 7, 204-223, on line (www.thescientificworld.com)
- Chapouthier G. (2009), Mosaic structures – a working hypothesis for the complexity of living organisms, E-Logos (Electronic Journal for Philosophy), University of Economics, Prague, 17, http://nb.vse.cz/kfil/elogos/biocosmology/chapouthier09.pdf
- Viaud-Delmon I., Venault P., Chapouthier G. (2011), Behavioral models for anxiety and multisensory integration in animals and humans, Progress in Neuro-Psychopharmacology & Biological Psychiatry,35, 1391–1399, on line, http://www.elsevier.com/wps/find/journaldescription.cws_home/525488/description#description
- Chapouthier G. (2012), Mosaic structures in living beings in the light of several modern stances, Biocosmology- Neo-Aristotelism, 2(1-2), 6-14, on line, http://en.biocosmology.ru/electronic-journal-biocosmology---neo-aristotelism
- Chapouthier G. (2014) Animal Rights, Encyclopedia of Global Bioethics (online) DOI 10.1007/978-3-319-05544-2_22-1, Springer Science+Business Media Dordrecht
