= Charles-Éric Lemaignen =

French politician

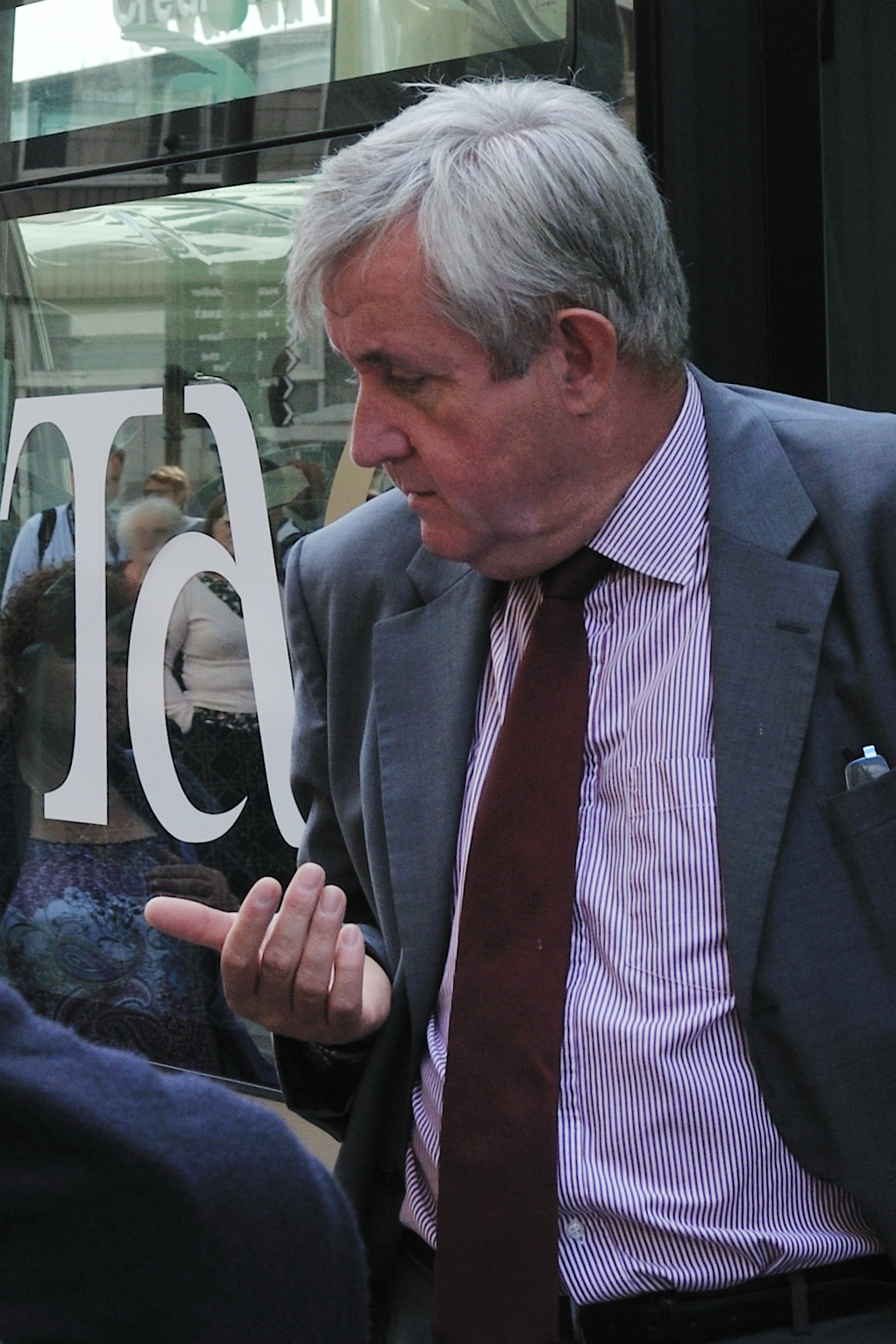
- Charles-Éric Lemaignen in 2010.

Deputy Mayor of Orléans

Municipal councillor of Orléans

President of the Assembly of the Communities of France
- Preceded by: Daniel Delaveau
- Succeeded by: Jean-Luc Rigaut

President of Orléans Métropole
- Preceded by: Jean-Pierre Sueur
- Succeeded by: Olivier Carré (politician)

Regional councillor of the Centre-Val de Loire

Personal details
- Born: Charles-Éric Lemaignen; 1952 (age 73–74) Orléans (Loiret)
- Party: UDF; UMP; LR
- Education: University of Orléans; Sciences Po Paris; HEC Paris
- Profession: Teacher, consultant
- Awards: Knight of the Legion of Honour (2007)

Charles-Éric Lemaignen (born on 19 April 1952 in Orléans) is a French politician. A member of the UMP and later The Republicans, he was the president of Orléans Métropole (2001–2017) and of the Assembly of the Communities of France (2014–2017).

== Biography ==
=== Professional career ===
Charles-Éric Lemaignen began his professional career in 1987 as Deputy Secretary-General in charge of finances at the Grenoble City Hall under Mayor Alain Carignon. He continued at the Caisse des Dêpôts et Consignations (CDC) where he became regional director of the CDC and Crédit Local in the Centre region from 1990 to 1992. He then became Director General of Services of the Regional Council of Centre alongside the president UDF Maurice Dousset from 1992 to 1998, the year of the president's electoral defeat, and then of Burgundy in 1999. Since 1990, he has also been a teacher and since 2001 an associate professor at the University of Orléans, where he taught public territorial management and financial management of local authorities in the Master's program until 2019. He was a lawyer at the Orleans Bar from 2000 to 2009 and then a collection director for a local finance magazine until 2016. After resigning from the presidency of Orléans Métropole, he created a consulting firm for local authorities, SASU Lemaignen Conseils.

=== Political career ===
Charles-Éric Lemaignen was elected municipal councillor in March 2001 on the list led by Serge Grouard in Orléans. As Deputy Mayor in charge of economic development, he was elected in April as President of the Orléans Val de Loire Metropolitan Area succeeding the outgoing mayor of Orléans, the Socialist Jean-Pierre Sueur.

Three years later, he headed the UMP list for the Loiret in the 2004 regional elections in the Centre region. The list received 35.97% of the votes in the second round behind the list led by the PS François Bonneau, sending five elected officials to the Regional Council, including Charles-Éric Lemaignen.

In 2008, he was re-elected Deputy Mayor and President of the Orléans Val de Loire Metropolitan Area following the March 2008 municipal elections.

In 2010, he was second on the Loiret list for the 2010 regional elections in the Centre region behind MEP and Deputy Mayor of Olivet, Catherine Soullie. He retained his position as a regional councillor until the end of 2015.

In 2014, during the municipal elections, he was re-elected for a third term as Deputy Mayor and President of the Orléans Val de Loire Metropolitan Area, a position he held until Olivier Carré replaced him on 16 June 2017.

On 8 October 2014, he was elected president of the Assembly of the Communities of France, a position he held until 4 October 2017, when he was succeeded by Jean-Luc Rigaut.

In the June 2020 municipal elections, he was re-elected for a fourth term as Deputy Mayor on Serge Grouard’s list.
