= Józef Dulak =

Polish scientist

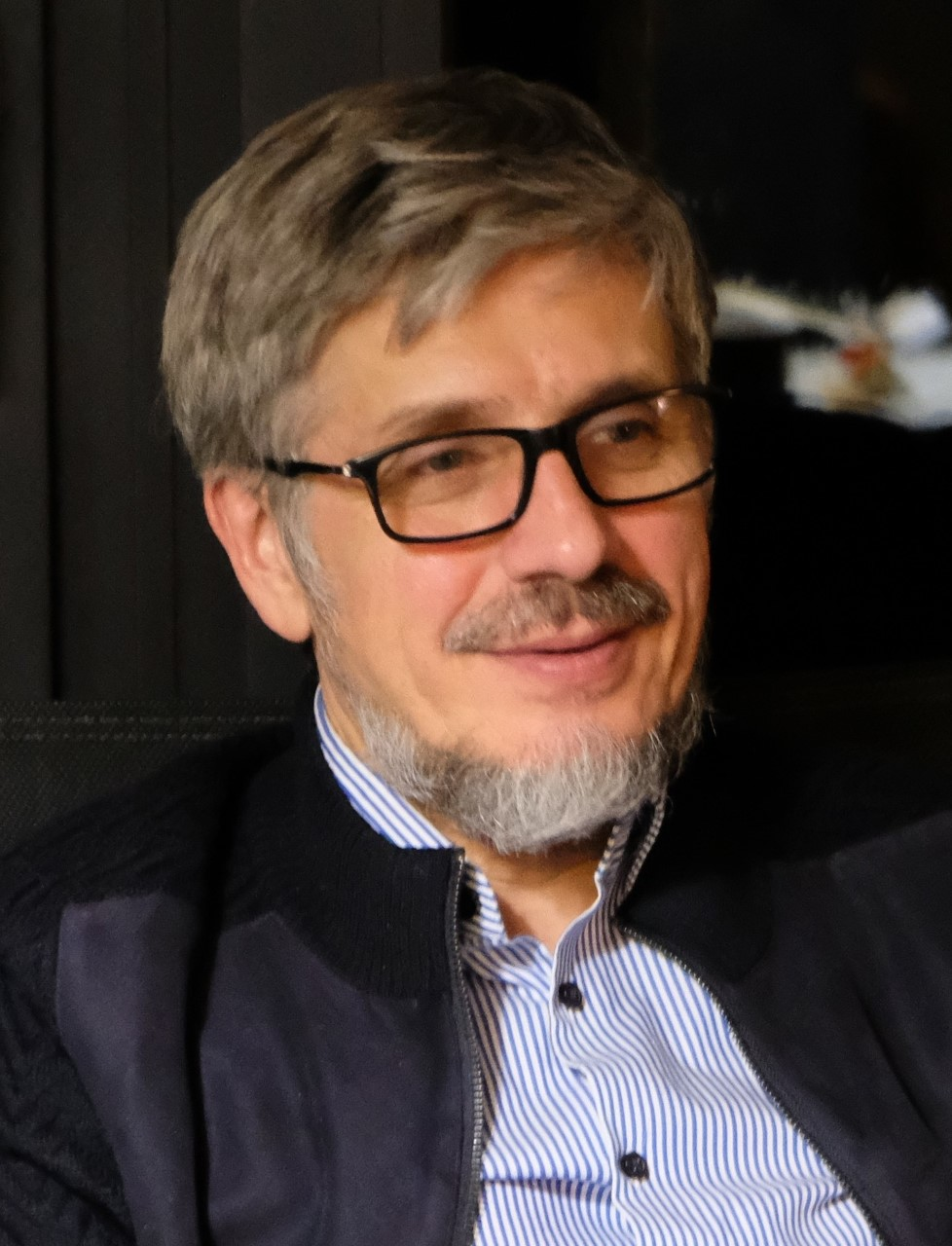
- Born: 15 June 1962 (age 64); Nowy Sącz, Poland
- Education: Jagiellonian University
- Occupations: Scientist, professor

Józef Dulak (born 15 June 1962 in Nowy Sącz) Polish scientist, professor of biological sciences, conducts research in the field of medical biotechnology, molecular biology and biochemistry. Head of the Department of Medical Biotechnology at the Faculty of Biochemistry, Biophysics and Biotechnology of the Jagiellonian University – FBBB JU (since 2005), Vice-Dean of FBBB JU (2006-2008). Honorary doctor of the University of Orléans, France (2012), corresponding member (since 2011), active member (since 2022) of the Polish Academy of Arts and Sciences, member of Academia Europaea (since 2022), fellow of the Polish-American Fulbright Foundation (STEM Impact Award, 2024 – University of Washington, Seattle).

Dulak conducts research in the field of medical biotechnology, molecular biology and biochemistry. Since 2005 he has been the head of the Department of Medical Biotechnology. at the Faculty of Biochemistry, Biophysics and Biotechnology at Jagiellonian University, with a tenure as deputy dean in the period 2006–2008.

Dulak holds an honorary doctorate from the Orleans University in France (2012), and is a member of the Polish Academy of Arts and Sciences (since 2011). He was the president of the European Vascular Biology Organisation (EVBO) in the period 2013–2017. In 2010, he served as visiting professor at the Japan Society for the Promotion of Science. From 2013, he has been the coordinator of the International Associated Laboratory (LIA – Laboratoire International Associe), supported by CNRS (France) and the Jagiellonian University (2013–2016; 2017–2020).

Co-author of more than 270 articles, co-editor of several books and co-author of a patent, Dulak’s interests include stem cell research, vascular biology and medicine, gene and cell therapy, disease mechanisms caused by inflammations and oxidative stress, and bioethics and the social role of science.

Dulak graduated from Jagiellonian University (major in biology) in 1986. In 2007 he earned the title of professor in biological sciences. He has held post-doctoral fellowships at the University of Amsterdam (1991), University of Münster (1994) and Stanford University (1997) and has also worked at the University of Innsbruck (1999–2001), and in 2014 he received the Dr. Luis Federico Leloir Prize from the Argentinean Ministry of Science, Technology and Innovation
