= Parc Floral de la Source =

Garden in France

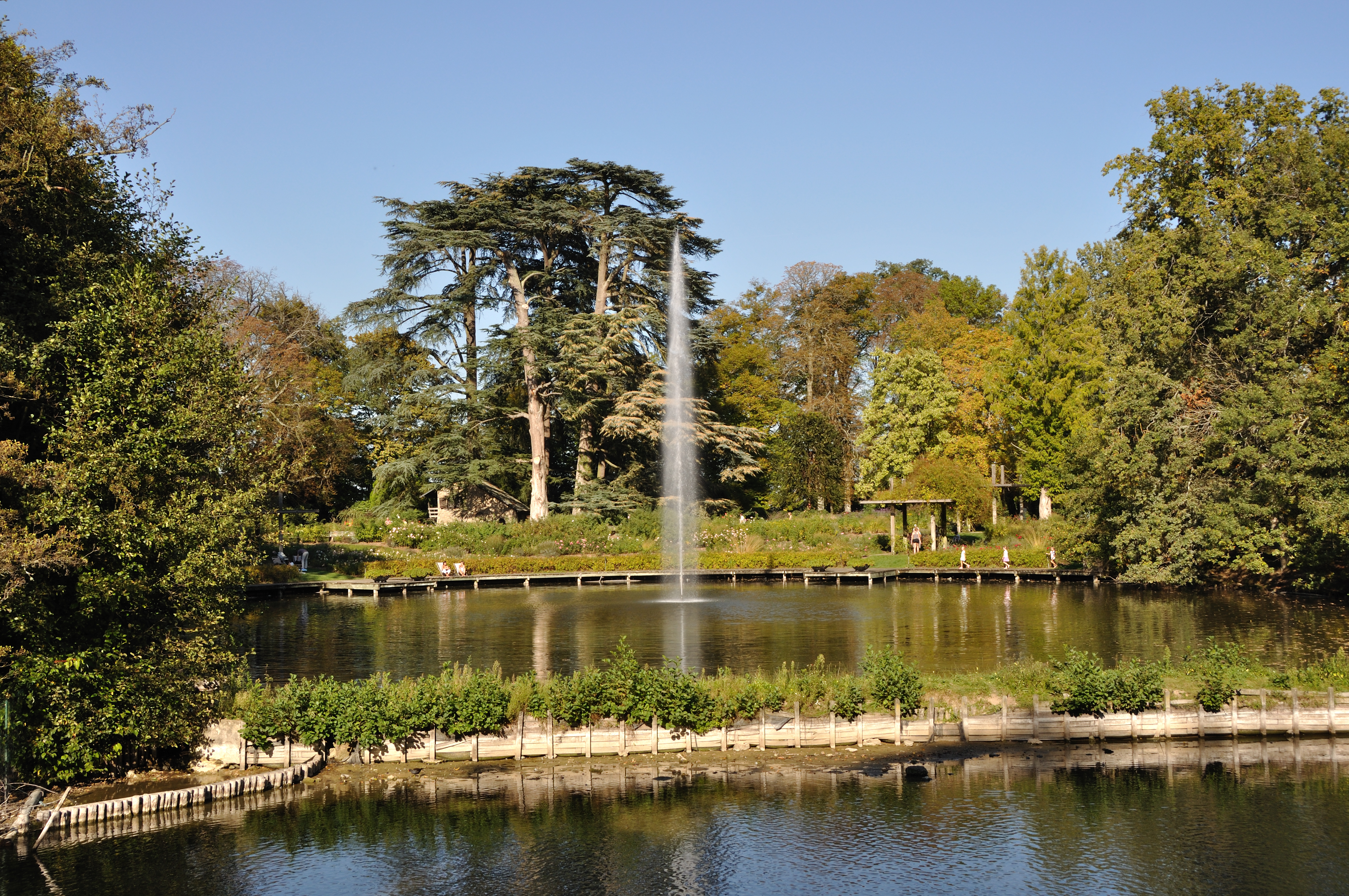
Fountains of the Parc Floral de la Source

The Parc Floral de la Source is a French garden situated to the south of the River Loire, in the La Source neighbourhood of the town of Orléans, in the département of Loiret. With more than 150,000 visitors in 2007, it is the most visited site in Loiret.

The source of the Loiret river is at the centre of the park.

The park has been awarded the status of Jardin remarquable by the French Ministry of Culture and the national council of parks and gardens.

== Geography ==
The Parc Floral de la Source extends over 35 ha (86.5 acres). It uses the natural contours of the site and consists of open spaces where the flora, fauna and minerals are juxtaposed.

Its unique geographical position, between the wooded region of Sologne and the plains of the Loire Valley, gives it a particular relief.

At its centre, after an underground course of several miles, is the Bouillon: the resurgence of the Loiret river.

With the passing seasons, successive flowering continually renews the appearance of the grounds.

== History ==
In 510, the land was ceded to the monks of the Abbey Saint-Mesmin de Micy by Clovis. From 1427, it belonged successively to various lords and noble families.

The first great gardening work, in the formal style of French gardens, dates from the beginning of the 18th century. During the 1720s, an ice-house, a library gallery, bas-reliefs and a terrace were incorporated into the garden.

In 1959, the city of Orléans and the département acquired the 410 hectares of the estate; 35 hectares were reserved to create the park, the rest being used to create the quarter of La Source as a site for the University of Orléans.

The garden opened in 1964 as a recreational park as well as a showcase for the horticultural department.

== Organisation of the park ==
The Parc Floral consists of two main parts: the plateau de Sologne and the plaine du Val de Loire.

=== Plateau de Sologne ===
The plateau is covered by a semi-natural forest of hornbeams and oaks. It is joined to the plain by a hillside which corresponds to a former fluvial terrace of the Loire. Located on the plateau are animal enclosures for a variety of species, including alpaca and Ouessant sheep.

=== La plaine du Val de Loire ===
The plain of the Loire valley is given over to floral and horticultural works. It includes the iris garden, the Miroir rose garden, the valley of perennials, the garden of the Source, the exotic butterfly glasshouse, the kitchen garden and the dahlia garden. Aviaries exhibit birds from several continents. This area also includes the source of Loiret.

=== The gardens and its collections ===
The park has several gardens including collections of ferns and rhododendrons, a rose garden, tropical gardens, rockery and flowering grasses.

The iris garden collection includes about 900 varieties, classified since 1996 as a specialist national collection.

A children's playground is available and a "train" tours the site.

== Exhibitions ==
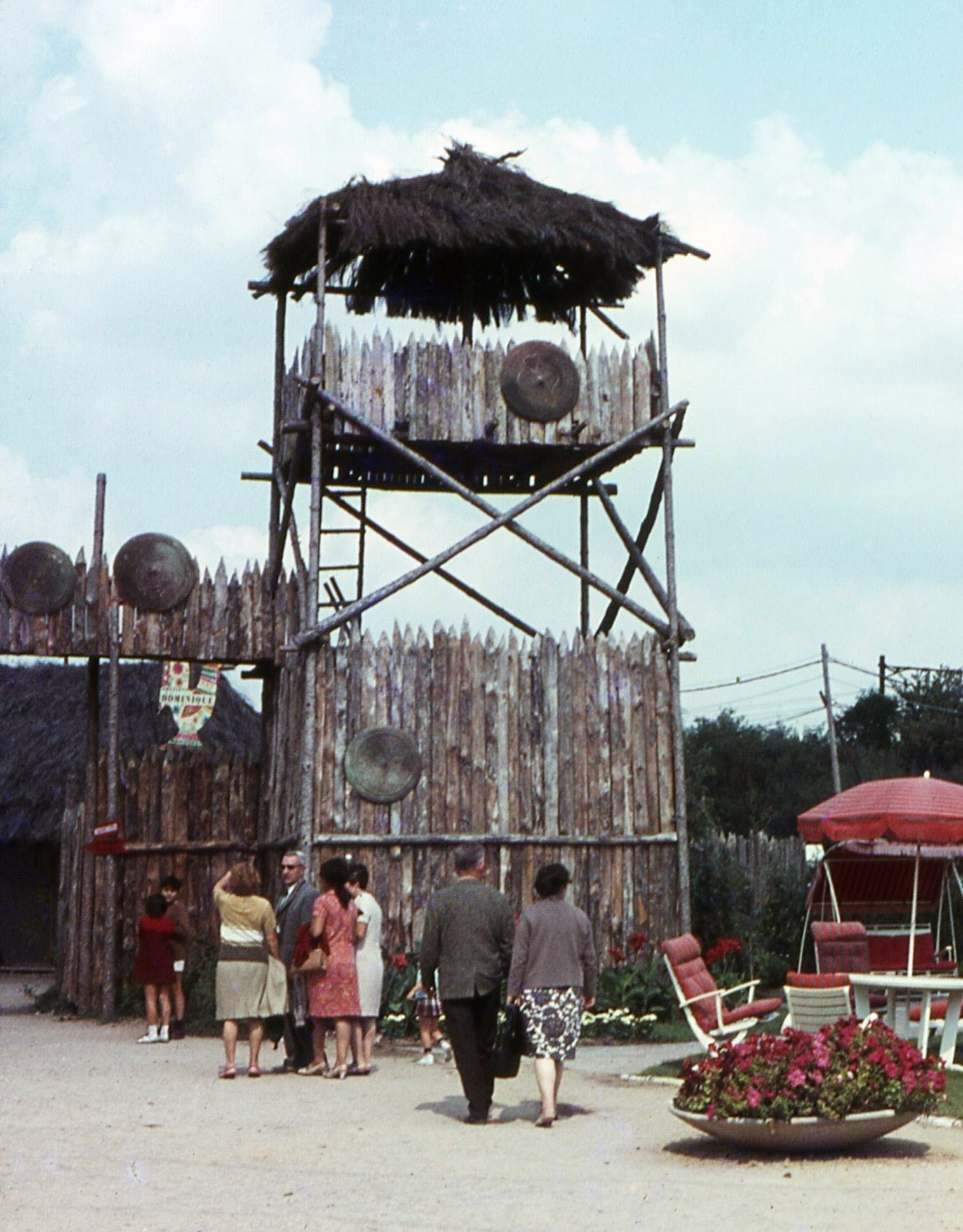
Entrance to the Gaulois village at the Floralies Internationales 1967

In 1967, the Floralies internationales d'Orléans attracted 2,300,000 visitors in six months. The global budget was more than one million francs. From April to October 1967, Orléans became the world capital of horticulture: 330 exhibitors, 700 producers from 11 countries, 13,000 m^{2} of glasshouses specially constructed to house successive exhibitions on 35 hectares. Apart from horticulture, the Floralies included several attractions including a reconstruction of a Gaulois village, thus destroying an ancient temple.

Other exhibitions : in 1996, voyage en chrysanthèmes and la ronde des fougères; in 1998, la fête de l'iris; in 1999, jardins du monde (30th salon of the chrysanthemum) and the international salon of the dahlia and fruits of autumn; in 2000, 200,000 bulbs in flower; in 2001, le parc de tous les enchantements et le monde des nains-ventés; in 2003, chrysanthèmes recup’art; in 2006, festival of exotic birds and orchids; in 2007, le festival de l'iris.

== Access ==
The park can be reached from the A71 motorway (exit 2); via the Route nationale 20; by train (nearest stations Aubrais or Orléans); by line A of the Orléans tramway or line 20 of the Semtao bus network. Lines 3, 5, 7 and 8 of the Ulys bus network serve Orléans-la-Source.

Admission to the park costs €6 for an adult, €4 for a child between 6 and 16 years, free for those under 6. Ticket office close an hour before the close of the park. Season tickets and group rates are available.

Opening times vary with the seasons. In 2009:

20 March to 4 October - 10h to 19h
5 October to 11 November - 10h to 18h
12 November to 19 March - 14h to 17h.

The park is closed on 1 January and 25 December.

== Bibliography ==
- Le parc floral de la Source, May 2006, Rustica
- Anne-Marie Royer-Pantin Orléans, le temps des jardins 2005, Hesse

== Maps and satellite views ==
- (in French) 47°50′51″N 1°56′16″E - Plans et vues satellites du parc floral de la Source

== Notes and references ==
Based on the article in French Wikipedia, Parc Floral de la Saource
