= Jeanne Henriette Louis =

Professor of civilization in North America at the University of Orléans

Jeanne Henriette Louis (often spelled Jeanne-Henriette Louis; born 8 February 1938 in Bordeaux), is professor emeritus of civilization in North America at the University of Orléans, France.

Her work relates to psychological warfare and the peace movement.

== Thesis ==
In 1983, Jeanne Henriette Louis defended her thesis on psychological warfare in the United States during World War II, entitled Les concepts de guerre psychologique aux États-Unis de 1939 à 1943, l’engrenage de la violence ("The concepts of psychological warfare in the United States from 1939 to 1943, the cycle of violence"). She felt that research on colonial America had ignored important elements, and her postdoctoral work focused on the seventeenth and eighteenth centuries in North America.

Jeanne Henriette Louis says that comparisons between the French colonization of the Americas and the British colonization of the Americas have rarely been conducted, and this field of investigation is rich and promising.

== Academic career ==
Assistant in the department of English at the University of Orleans in 1970, Jeanne Henriette Louis became professor of American civilization in 1989. In 2001 she retired as professor emeritus.

== Research topics ==
Following her PhD, Jeanne Henriette Louis became interested in peace movements and especially the Religious Society of Friends (Quakers), the Quakers of Nantucket, the neutrality of Acadia during the Franco-British wars, as well as the founding of Pennsylvania by William Penn.

=== Commitments ===
She is active in the Religious Society of Friends in France and a member of the sponsoring committee of the French Coalition for the Decade (2010).

== Books ==
- J.H. Louis, L'engrenage de la violence. La guerre psychologique aux États-Unis pendant la Deuxième Guerre mondiale, Payot, Paris, 1987, 342 p. Abridged version of the doctoral thesis of state.
- J.H. Louis et J.O. Héron, William Penn et les quakers. Ils inventèrent le Nouveau Monde, coll. Découvertes Gallimard vol. 90, Paris: Gallimard, 1990, 176 p. (ISBN 2-07-053096-5)
- J.H. Louis, La société religieuse des Amis (quakers), Coll. Fils d’Abraham, Turnhout, Brepols, Belgique, 2005. (ISBN 978-2-503-52039-1)
