= Loiret (river) =

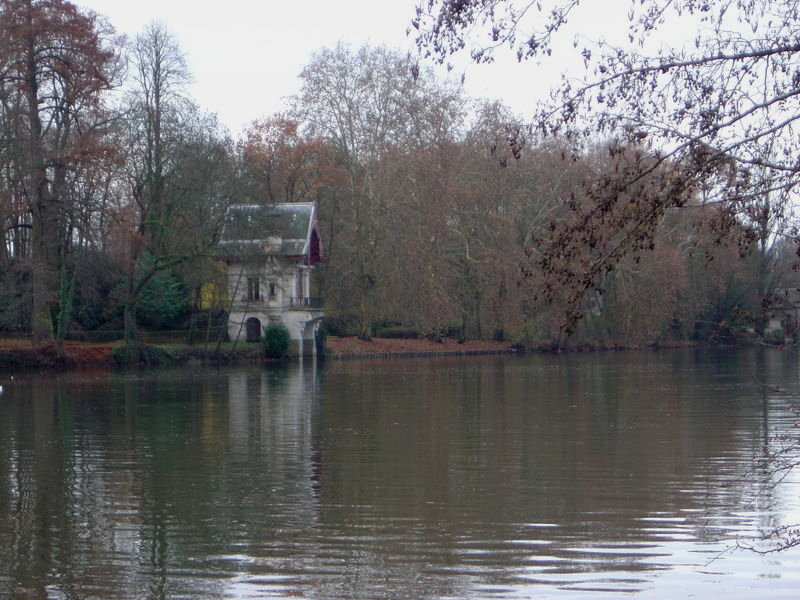
- The Loiret near Olivet, south of Orléans

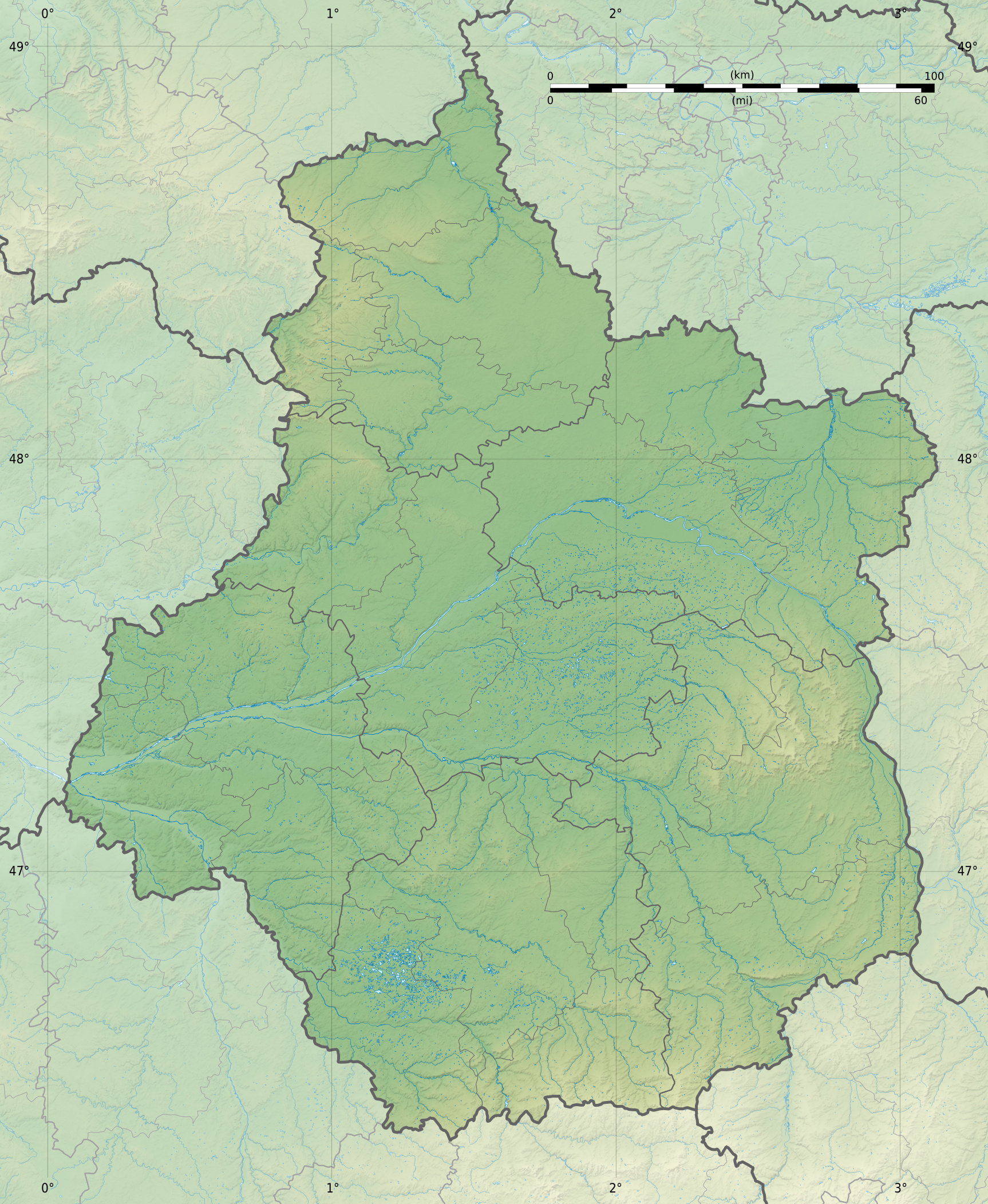
- Location within France Location within Centre-Val de Loire

Location
- Country: France

Physical characteristics
- Source
  - coordinates: 47.8504°N 1.9372°E
- Mouth
  - location: Loire
  - coordinates: 47.8644°N 1.8005°E
- Length: 11.6 km (7.2 mi)

Basin features
- Progression: Loire→ Atlantic Ocean

The Loiret (French pronunciation: [lwaʁɛ]) is a 11.6-kilometre (7.2 mi) long river in France, a left tributary to the Loire. Its waters come from infiltrations from the Loire.

Its course is completely within the Loiret département, to which it gives its name.

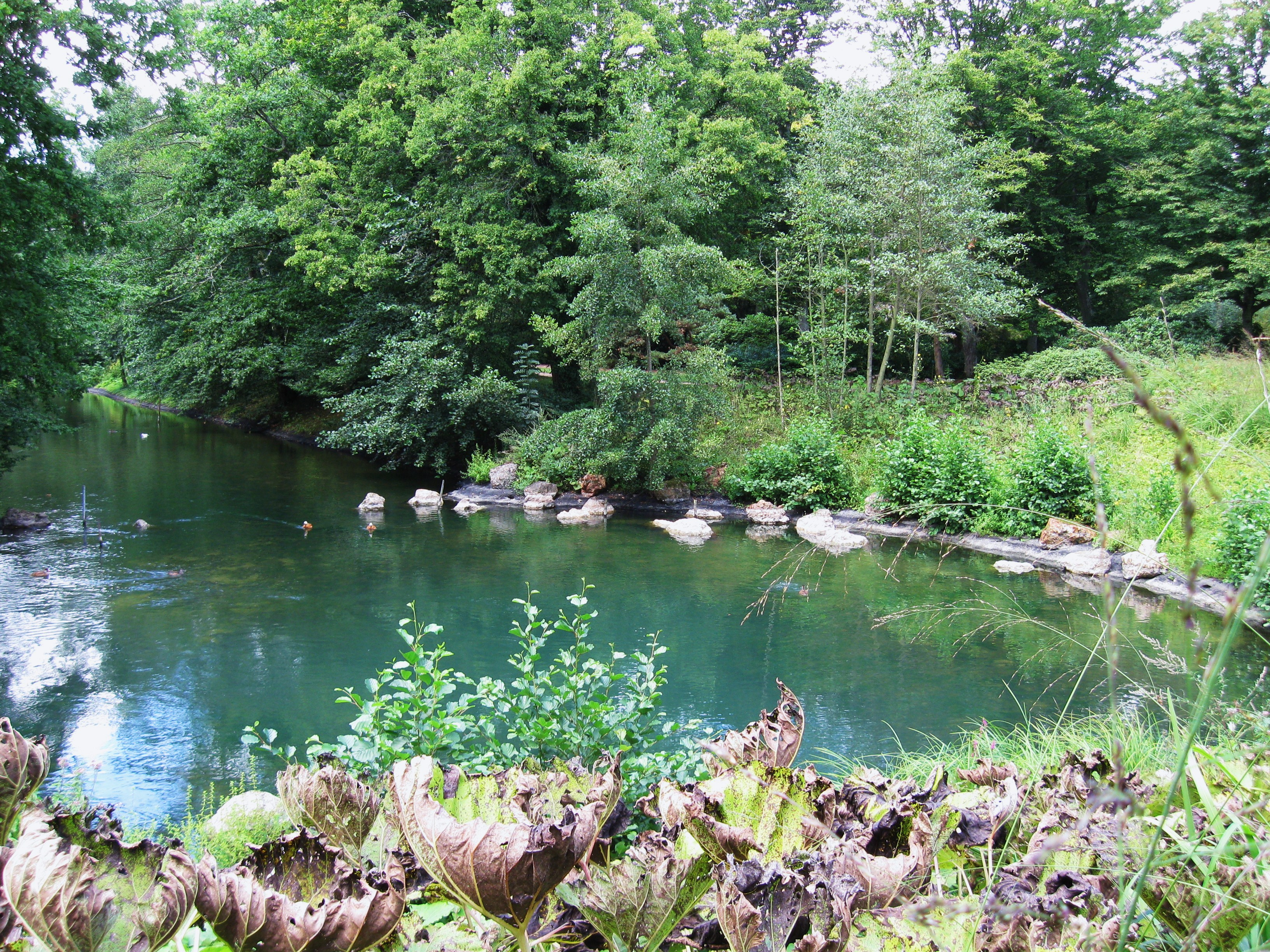
Le Bouillon

The Loiret, south of Orléans, with its picturesque former mills, is a popular destination for walking and boating trips. The source of the Loiret is a feature of the Parc Floral de la Source (Le Bouillon), and its mouth in Saint-Hilaire-Saint-Mesmin, southwest of Orléans.
