= Michel Jébrak =

- Born: France
- Occupations: Geologist, academic and researcher
- Awards: Bancroft Prize, Royal Society of Canada; Great geoscientific merit, Order of Geologists of Quebec; Knight, Ordre des Palmes académiques, France; Jean Descarreaux Award, Association of Mining Explorers of Quebec; Golden Hammer, Ministry of Energy and Natural Resources Québec

Academic background
- Education: Master's, Geology; Diploma of Advanced Studies in Applied Geology; Doctorate of Specialization, Geology and Geochemistry of Natural Resources; Doctorate of Science, Natural Sciences
- Alma mater: Pierre and Marie Curie University; University of Orléans

Academic work
- Institutions: University of Quebec in Montreal

Michel Jébrak is a Franco-Canadian geologist, academic and a researcher. He is an emeritus professor at University of Quebec's Department of Earth and Atmospheric Sciences. He is a former Vice-Rector for Research and Creation at UQAM and holder of the UQAT-UQAM Mining Entrepreneurship Chair.

Jébrak's areas of expertise include geology of mineral resources, mining innovation and exploration, social innovations and transformations and Earth Science. He has published over 100 research papers and has contributed to the discovery of copper deposits in Oman and gold in Mauritania. He contributed in founding the Order of Geologists of Quebec, the Heart of Sciences at UQAM, the University Network on Mineral Diversification of Quebec, the CONSOREM and the Canadian Council of Mining Innovation. He also contributed to the formation of Mines and Society System Chair at the Ecole des Mines de Nancy, in France.

He is the founding member of Quebec section at the Geological Association of Canada. He has served as president of the scientific council of Ouranos, and of Science and Technology Quebec Council. In 2013, Jébrak was awarded the Chercheur d’Excellence Award by the University of Lorraine. In 2018, he was awarded the Bancroft Prize.

== Education ==
Jébrak completed his master's in geology from Pierre and Marie Curie University, Paris, in 1975. He then studied at University of Orléans, and received his Diploma of Advanced Studies in Applied Geology in 1977 and his Doctorate of Specialization in Geology and Geochemistry of Natural Resources in the following year. In 1984, he received his Doctorate of Science degree in Natural Sciences from University of Orléans.

== Career ==
Jébrak worked briefly at The Ministry of Energy and Mining in Morocco before being appointed by B.R.G.M. as a geologist and project manager for a seven-year term in 1980. He then moved from France to Canada and joined UQAM's Department of Earth and Atmospheric Sciences as Professor of Geology. In 2019, he was promoted to emeritus professor at the university.

Along with his academic responsibilities, Jébrak also held administrative appointments at the university. He was appointed as the Head of his department from 1999 till 2001 and served as dean of science in the following year. He has played a role in initiation and development of the Cœur des Sciences at UQAM. Jébrak was elected as Vice-Rector for Research and Creation at UQAM from 2004 to 2008 and was the holder of chair in Mining Entrepreneurship at UQAT-UQAM from 2010 till 2018. He was President of the Science and Technology Council in the Quebec government in 2009.

Jébrak is also an economic geologist and has over 30 years of field experience. From 1984 till 1986, he served as project manager at BRGM for an exploration project for gold in Cameroun and for copper and gold in Oman. He served as regional exploration manager for West Africa La Source Mining Company and led the grass-root exploration in Lero Fayalala and the development of the large gold Tasiast project in Mauritania. He was associated with Goviex as an exploration manager and was involved in the strategy, technical evaluation and management of exploration projects for minerals and metals in West Africa. In 2012, he was appointed as a Senior Associate for TGM and served as a project manager at Effigis from 2017 till 2018.

== Research ==
Jébrak has conducted research focusing on mining exploration and engineering, geopolitics of mineral resources geology and Earth Science along with social innovations and transformations. He has carried out a series of research on mineral deposits, mainly in Quebec, France and Africa. He studied the gold deposits associated with granites.

=== Mineral resources ===
Jébrak has conducted significant research on the exploration of base and precious metals and the evaluation of mineral potential. In 2000s, Jébrak worked on normative minerals and alteration indices for mineral exploration and applied NORMAT technique for the quantification of hydrothermal alterations. He then studied the alkali element depletion in the context of chloritization, paragonitization and pyrophillitization components. His applied method allowed the estimation of carbon dioxide content from normative loss on ignition, which in turn leads to calculation of carbonate minerals.

=== Structural geology and geodynamics: fragmentation processes ===
Along with his study on mineral resources, Jébrak also focused on structural geology and geodynamics. He used a quantitative approach using fractal geometry for characterizing breccia in hydrothermal environment. His landmark paper has been cited more than 300 time since it publication in 1997. The method allows to reconstruct the conditions of formation and was applied in several environments including precious and base-metal vein type deposits, unconformity-related uranium deposits, porphyry systems and iron-oxyde-gold-copper deposits.

With his student Matton, he proposed a new interpretation of the Richat structure in Mauritani. He proposed that in the core, it has gigantic breccia related to karst dissolution, which is surrounded by hydrothermal fluids.

Jébrak has also studied mineralizations related to the alkaline magmatism. In the mercury Almaden deposit in Spain, he demonstrated the epigenetic origin of mercury in relation with alkaline magmatism. In the Abitibi greenstone belt of Canada, he studied REE-deposits associated with carbonatite. With several students, he showed that several gold deposits are associated with the alkaline sanukitoid magmatism and could represent the local source of orogenic gold concentration.

In mid 2010s, Jébrak authored an article regarding depositional setting and structural evolution of the Archean Perseverance volcanogenic massive sulfide deposit in Quebec. He explained the geography of sulfide deposit and also highlighted the features of the deposit formation through subseafloor replacement. His research indicated a simultaneous activity of massive sulfide formation at Perseverance and tuffaceous sedimentation on the seabed. He then presented a possible explanation for the decrease in alteration above the ore bodies.

=== Social responsibility on mining exploration ===
Jébrak has also worked on social responsibility in the context of mining exploration. In order to determine the acceptability of a project to its associated stakeholders, Jébrak developed a social risk index in mining projects and described it as a predictive tool capable of modulating projects in an acceptable manner for all the stakeholders.

In a similar article about social risk index, Jébrak conducted a study in Quebec and applied social risk index in order to determine the risks associated with the conflicts between the company and the local community in the early stages of mineral resource development and advanced exploration. His proposed model, which applies to Quebec, is based on analytical explanations of major determinants of conflicts.

== Awards and honors ==
- 1999-1999 - Golden Hammer, Ministry of Energy and Natural Resources, Québec
- 2003 - Geoscientific Merit, Ordre des Géologues du Québec
- 2005, 2018 - Jean Descarreaux Award, Association of Mining Explorers of Quebec
- 2009 - Knight, Order of Academic Palms
- 2011 - Great geoscientific merit, Order of Geologists of Quebec
- 2013 - Chercheur d’Excellence Award, University of Lorraine
- 2018 - Bancroft Prize, Royal Society of Canada

== Bibliography ==
=== Books ===
- Géologie des gîtes minéraux. Ministère des Ressources Naturelles et de la Faune (2008) ISBN 978-2-551-23737-1
- 100 innovations dans le secteur minier. (2011) ISBN 978-2-9812840-0-6
- Geology of Mineral Resources (2015) ISBN 978-1-897095-73-7
- Quels métaux pour demain? Les enjeux des ressources minérales. (2015) ISBN 978-2-100726-11-0
- Objectif Lithium. Réussir la transition énergétique. Éditions Multimondes (2021) co-author Christian Hocquard ISBN 978-2-8977-32615
- Des mines et des empires. Une saga géopolitique des ressources minérales. Éditions Multimondes (2024) ISBN 978-2-8977-34022

=== Selected articles ===
- Jébrak, Michel (December 1997). "Hydrothermal breccias in vein-type ore deposits: A review of mechanisms, morphology and size distribution". Ore Geology Reviews. 12 (3): 111–134. doi:10.1016/S0169-1368(97)00009-7.
- Hernández, A.; Jébrak, M.; Higueras, P.; Oyarzun, R.; Morata, D.; Munhá, J. (7 July 1999). "The Almadén mercury mining district, Spain". Mineralium Deposita. 34 (5–6): 539–548. doi:10.1007/s001260050219. hdl:10578/1287.
- Voicu, G.; Bardoux, M.; Stevenson, R.; Jébrak, M. (10 April 2000). "Nd and Sr isotope study of hydrothermal scheelite and host rocks at Omai, Guiana Shield: implications for ore fluid source and flow path during the formation of orogenic gold deposits". Mineralium Deposita. 35 (4): 302–314. doi:10.1007/s001260050243.
- Ross, P.-S.; Jebrak, M.; Walker, B. M. (December 2002). "Discharge of Hydrothermal Fluids from a Magma Chamber and Concomitant Formation of a Stratified Breccia Zone at the Questa Porphyry Molybdenum Deposit, New Mexico". Economic Geology. 97 (8): 1679–1699. doi:10.2113/gsecongeo.97.8.1679.
- Fayol, Noémie; Jébrak, Michel (December 2017). "Archean Sanukitoid Gold Porphyry Deposits: A New Understanding and Genetic Model from the Lac Bachelor Gold Deposit, Abitibi, Canada" (PDF). Economic Geology. 112 (8): 1913–1936. doi:10.5382/econgeo.2017.4534.
- Matton, Guillaume; Jébrak, Michel; Lee, James K.W. (August 2005). "Resolving the Richat enigma: Doming and hydrothermal karstification above an alkaline complex" (PDF). Geology. 33 (8): 665–668. doi:10.1130/G21542AR.1.
