= Norbert-Bertrand Barbe =

French painter

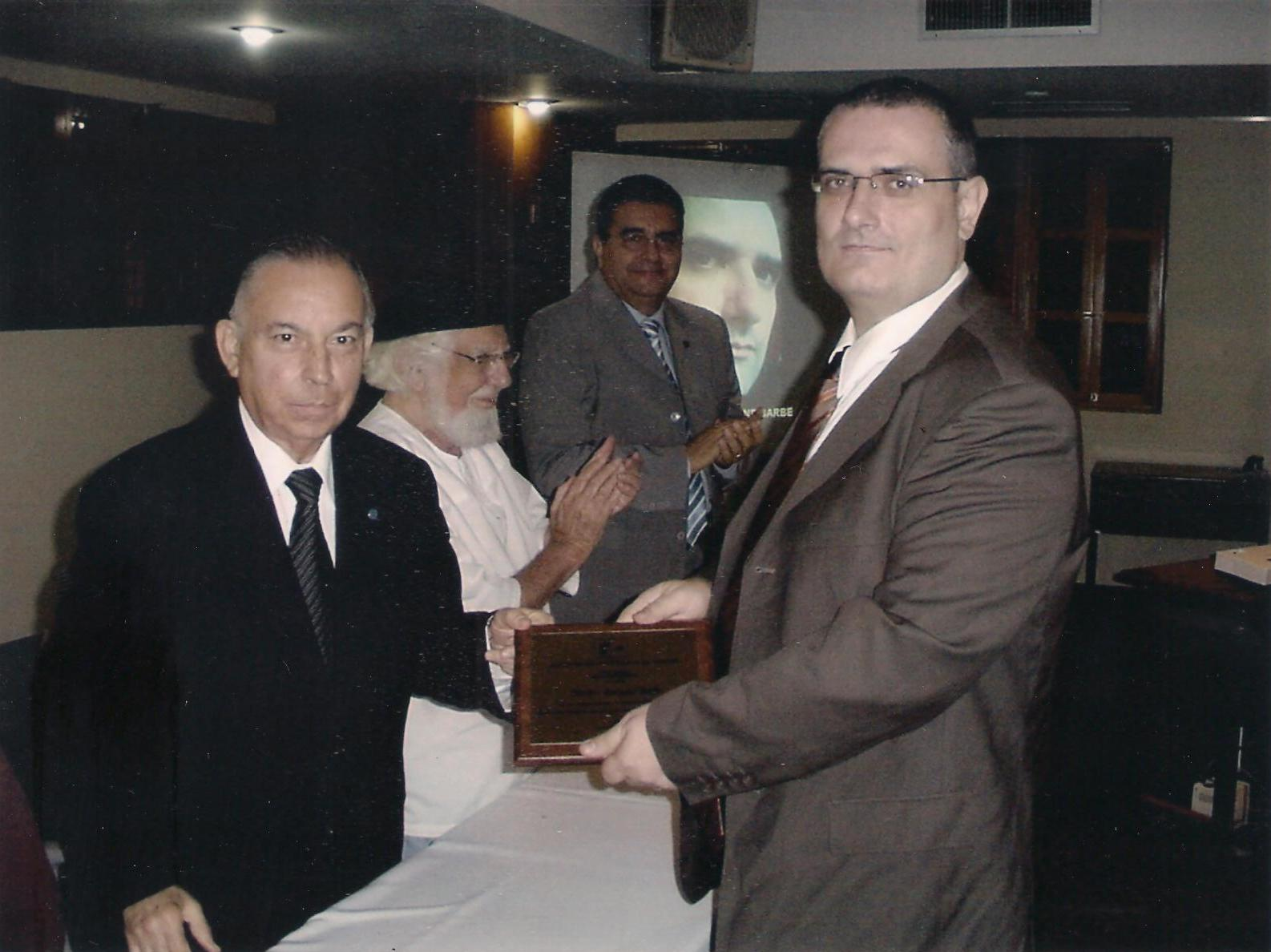
A portrait of Norbert-Bertrand Barbe receiving award

Norbert-Bertrand Barbe is a French art historian, semiologist, artist and writer. He was born in 1968 and has a master's degree in art history (Université Paris X, 1991) and a Ph.D. in Comparative Literature (Université d'Orléans, 1996). He is an Honorary Member of the Nicaraguan Academy of Language.

== Biography ==
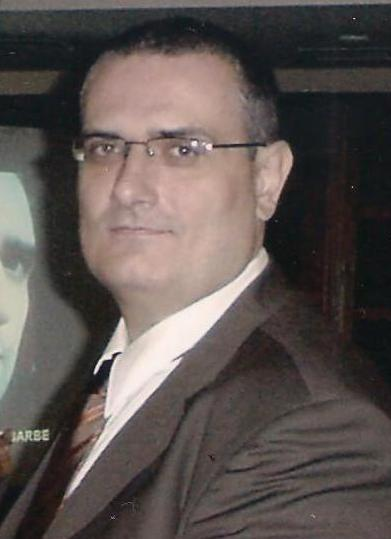
Norbert-Bertrand Barbe (January 2009)

Barbe worked as a teacher and researcher since 1992 in several French, Costa Rican and Nicaraguan institutions. His fields are the Middle Ages, modern times and the contemporary era. He dedicated himself to the study of symbolic productions, (plastic arts), literature, cinema, myths and the methodological and epistemological rationalization of its approach. He developed this approach in his doctoral thesis "The themes of the Raft of the Medusa by Théodore Géricault studied through their recurrence in the work of the painter, and art and literature of the 19th century" (1992) and "Roland Barthes and the aesthetic theory" (1996), in his book Arturo Andrés Roig and the epistemological problem (1998). He is the author of more than 1200 articles. published in national print media and magazines (France, Spain, United States, Mexico, Nicaragua), and on internet (Spain, Colombia, Mexico, Venezuela, Puerto Rico, Costa Rica).

As editor, he published more than two hundred books, more than fifty such as author, and about ten as a translator. So he is the first and only translator and editor to the French of the major classics of Nicaraguan literature, like Salomón de la Selva, Alfonso Cortés, Ernesto Cardenal and Carlos Martinez Rivas. The theoretical books by Norbert-Bertrand Barbe are accessible on the main University libraries around the world (Yale, Princeton, Emory, Harvard, Oxford, Heidelberg, La Sorbonne, Tokyo, Kyoto, etc., as well as in the Library of Congress or in the National Library of Sweden).

== Artistic orientation and theoric relevance ==
In poetry and art, his work has evolved from a naturalistic expressionism to decomposition formal and narrative questions, particularly through the shocker pop and photomontages.
In the 2000s he developed "processal" works and "geometric poems and tales", which incorporate the concept of "Not Happening" and "reverse literature" in which the structure of the narrative construction appears to the reader/viewer. He is co-founder of the movement Kites (1996–1999) and any Name (1998–2005), founder of the journal Go Home (2005 to date) and founder of Bes editions (2001 to date).
As a theorist, his path is defined by its combination of different academic disciplines. He has a master's degree in low medieval art history, and a DEA and PhD in Comparative Literature, modern and contemporary respectively, (his PhD touching issues of aesthetic and epistemological study of the works), with significant contributions to the humanities studies:

- The unification of a general theory of interpretation of symbolic productions through his books Iconologia (about visual arts), Myths (about mythology), Literary origins of contemporary thought (about literature), Essays on filmic iconology (about films).
- Mirroring macro phenomena from micro (Nicaragua).
- The comprehensive approach to the development and structural evolution of the modern mentality to the contemporary one studied in its works. In books: Culture Lodge, The Construction of the Me; Literary origins of contemporary thought; Nothingness in contemporary thought; Darian Studies.
- The iconological approach to contemporary art and motifs as minimal units of meaning to assume the abstract work as a historical phenomenon readable since his time. In books: Representation: Iconographic problem of contemporary art; Sur-realism; The Scream by Edvard Munch: A paradigmatic case of staging iconic codes of an era; Stéphane Mallarmé and the question of abstract art.
- The study of modern and contemporary architecture as an expression not just concrete and practical of using necessities, but also intellectual of formal tensions. In books: Meaning and context of the Black square on White background by Kazimir Malevich: An testimonial and argumentative object of vanguards in their controversies with figurative art about issues of color and formal composition; A History of Modern Architecture 12th–18th centuries; History of contemporary architecture 19th-21th [sic?] centuries.
- The analysis of discourses of domination from the study of mass speech. In books: Two essays on Laugh; Elements of the political construction of contemporary thought nineteenth-twentieth centuries – Criticism and lies: From Public School to Socialism of the 21th [sic?] century; Vox Populi: Why we are not free; Metalanguage and dominance speeches in the postmodern culture and politics.

== Visual art ==
Gallery of Norbert-Bertrand Barbe
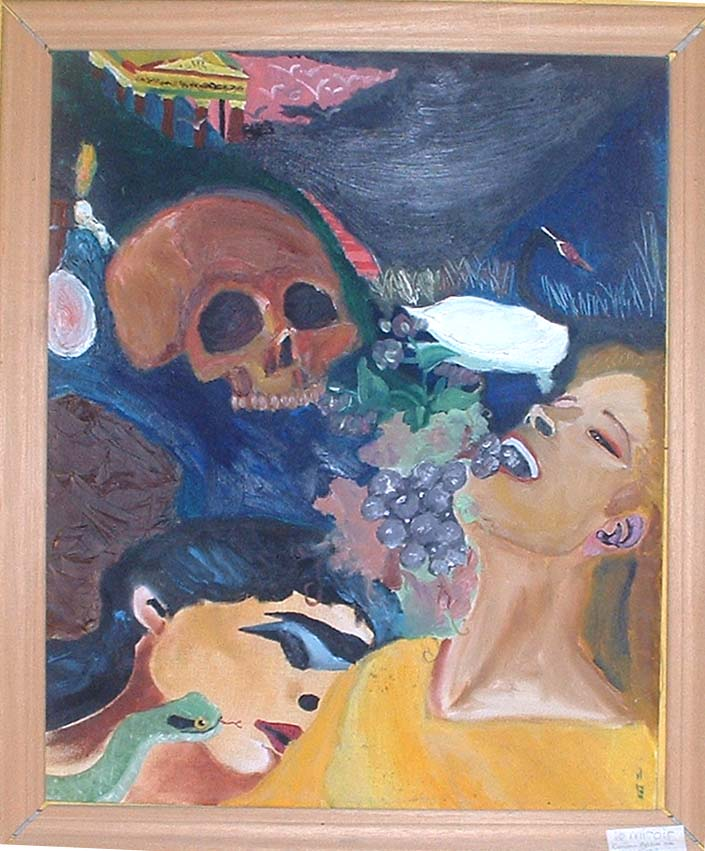
Adam and Eve, oil on canvas, 1986

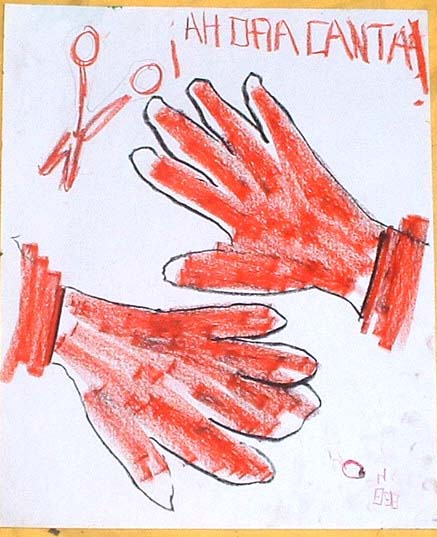
Tribute: Victor Jara, drawing on paper, 1998

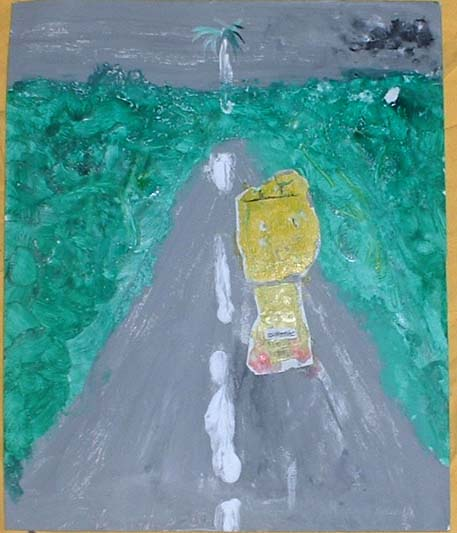
Nica Bus, gouache on paper, 1999

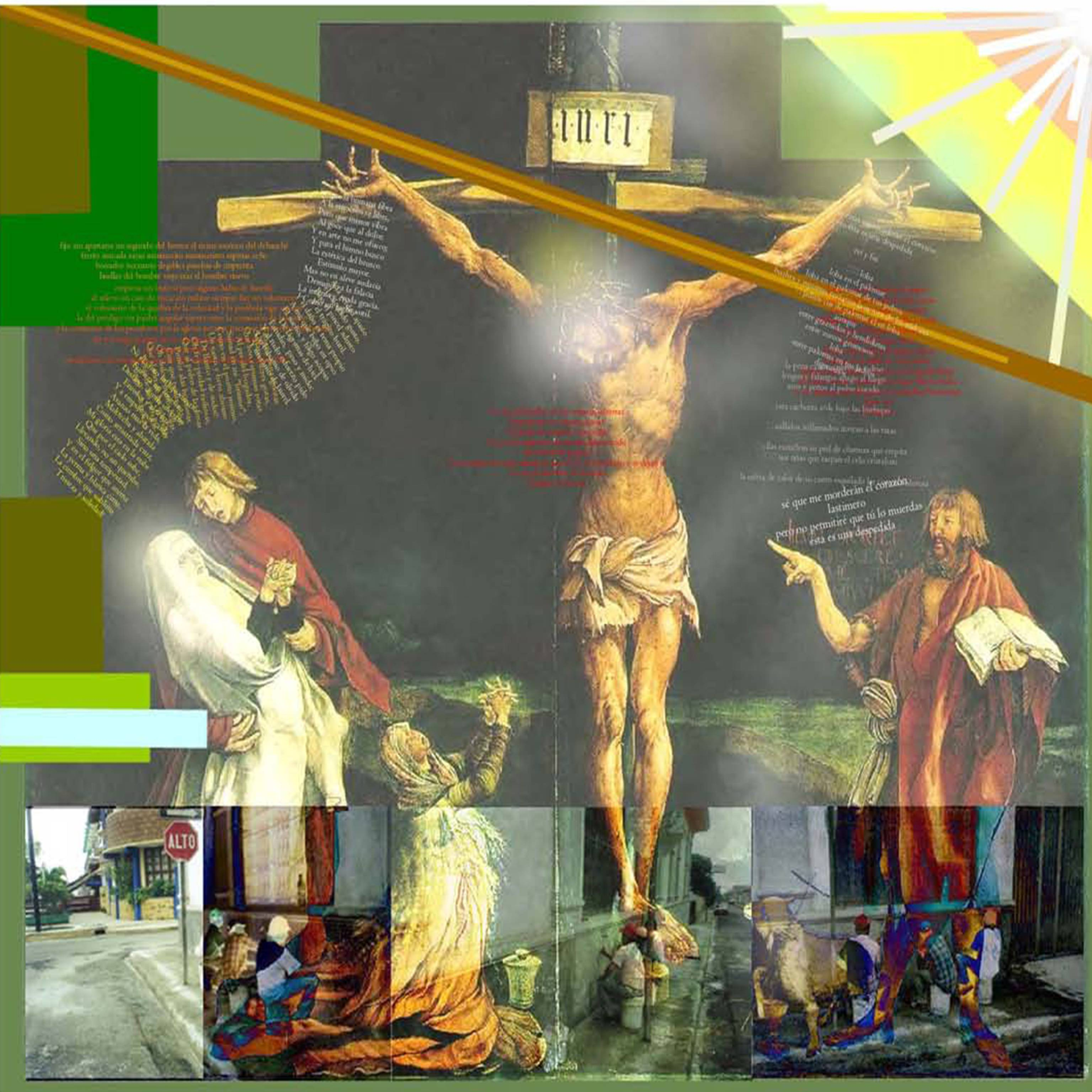
'But they did the 3 dwarves at the foot of the Cross? photomontage, 2002

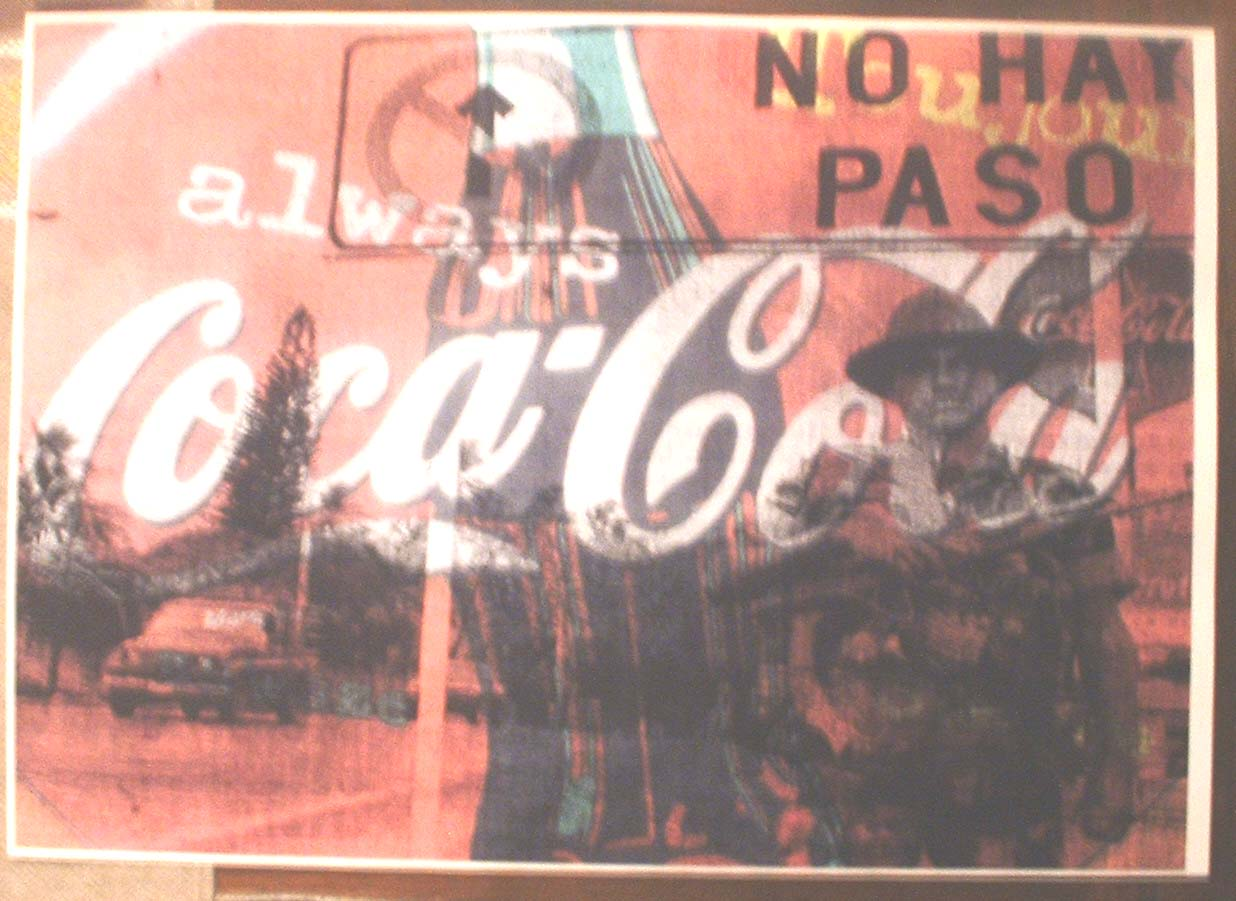
No Way Out, photomontage, 2003

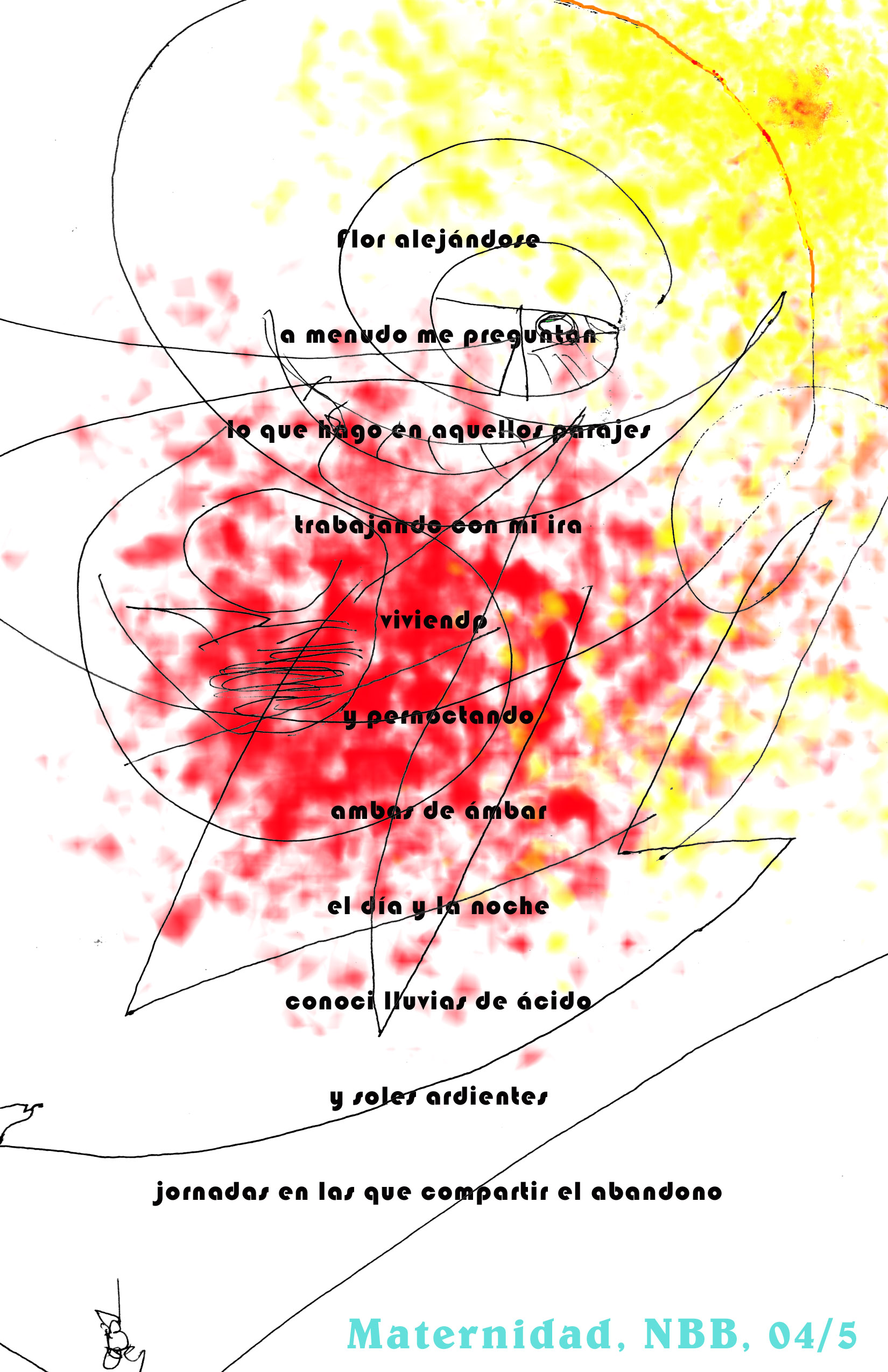
Maternity, photomontage, 2007

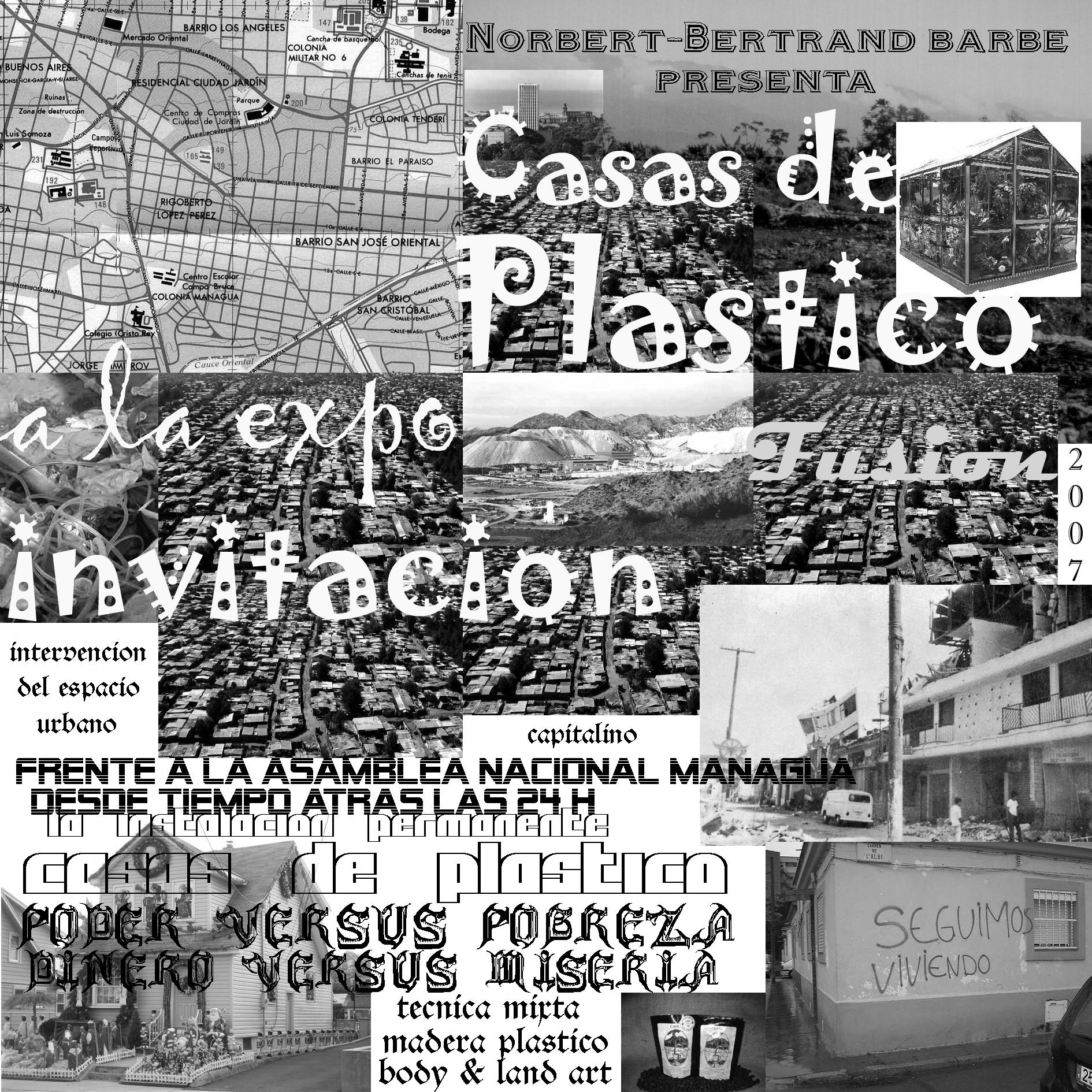
Plastic Houses, photomontage, 2008
