= Emmanuel Trélat =

French mathematician (born 1974)

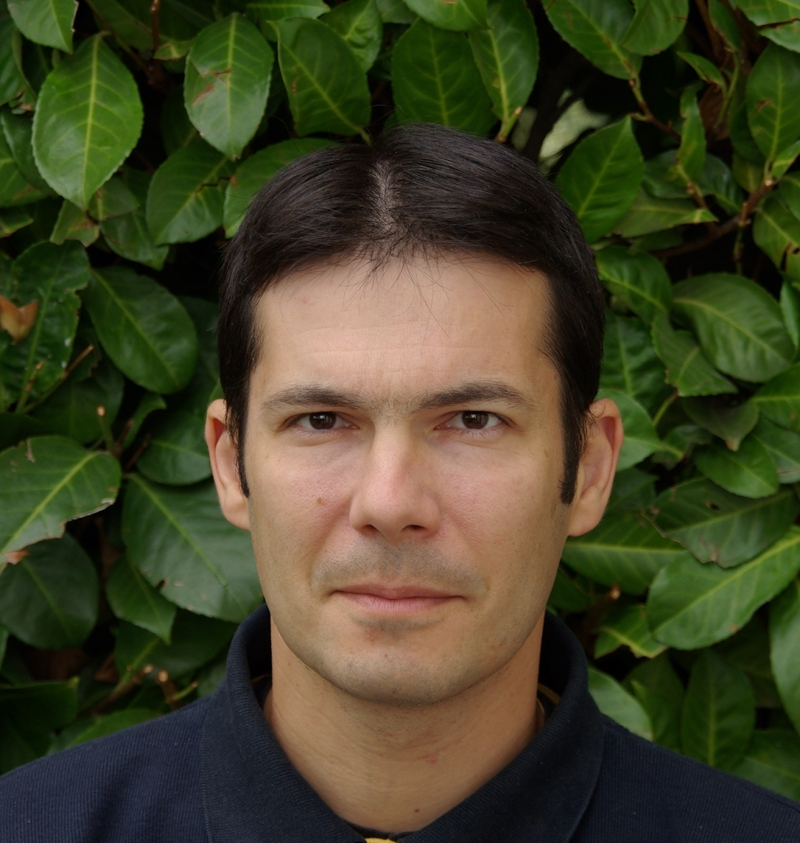
- Born: 24 December 1974 (age 51)
- Education: University of Burgundy; École normale supérieure de Cachan
- Scientific career
- Fields: Control theory
- Workplaces: Sorbonne Université
- Thesis: Etude asymptotique et transcendance de la fonction valeur en contrôle optimal (2000)
- Doctoral advisor: Bernard Bonnard

Emmanuel Trélat (born 24 December 1974) is a French mathematician.

== Education and career ==
Emmanuel Trélat was admitted at École normale supérieure de Cachan (mathematics) in 1995 and obtained the agrégation in 1998. In 2000, he obtained a doctorate under the direction of Bernard Bonnard at the University of Burgundy at Dijon with thesis titled Étude asymptotique et transcendance de la fonction valeur en contrôle optimal; catégorie log-exp en géométrie sous-Riemannienne dans le cas Martinet (Asymptotic study and transcendence of the value function in optimal control; category log-exp in sub-Riemannian geometry in the Martinet case). In 2001 he was appointed an assistant professor at the University of Paris-Sud, where he obtained in 2005 his habilitation Contrôle en dimension finie et infinie (Control in finite and infinite dimension). In 2006 he was appointed a professor at the University of Orleans. Since 2011 he has been a professor at Sorbonne Université at the Laboratoire Jacques-Louis Lions. From 2015 to 2019 he was the director of the Fondation sciences mathématiques de Paris. Since 2020, he is the director of the Laboratoire Jacques-Louis Lions.

Emmanuel Trélat's research focuses on control theory in finite and infinite dimensions, sub-Riemannian geometry, image analysis, domain optimization. He is also a specialist in numerical methods in optimal control, particularly in aerospace applications.

== Honors and awards ==
- 2006 — SIAM Outstanding Paper Prize
- 2010 — Prix Maurice-Audin
- 2011 — elected a member of the Institut universitaire de France
- 2012 — Felix Klein Prize
- 2014 — Prix Blaise-Pascal
- 2016 — Prix Madame Victor Noury
- 2018 — Invited Speaker, International Congress of Mathematicians at Rio de Janeiro
- 2024 — elected a member of the Academia Europaea

== Selected publications ==
- Contrôle optimal: theorie et applications. Paris: Vuibert. 2005. ISBN 978-2-7117-2219-8; 250 pages SUDOC 129684163
- with Bernard Bonnard and Ludovic Faubourg: Mécanique céleste et contrôle de systèmes spatiaux. Mathématiques et applications, 51. Springer Verlag. 2006. ISBN 978-3-540-28373-7; xiv + 276 pages SUDOC 094211973
