= Pierre Roubertoux =

French behavioral geneticist

- Born: Pierre L. Roubertoux; June 26, 1937 (age 88); Algiers, Algeria
- Education: University of Caen; University of Strasbourg; University of Paris; Paris X Nanterre; Paris Descartes University
- Awards: Behavior Genetics Association Dobzhansky Memorial Award (2000)
- Scientific career
- Fields: Behavioral genetics
- Institutions: Paris Descartes University, University of Orleans

Pierre L. Roubertoux (born June 26, 1937) is a French behavioral geneticist.

== Early life and education ==
Roubertoux was born on June 26, 1937, in Algiers, Algeria. He received his undergraduate education in biology and psychology at the University of Caen, the University of Strasbourg, and the University of Paris. He received a degree in genetics and biochemistry from the University of Paris VI in 1970. He then received a doctoral degree from Paris X Nanterre in 1972, followed by three more from Paris Descartes University in 1977, 1979, and 1982.

== Academic career ==
Roubertoux was a professor of psychology at Paris Descartes University from 1981 to 1983, after which he became a professor of genetics there. In 1995, he became a professor of genetics at the University of Orléans. In 2005, he became an emeritus professor at the University of the Mediterranean and began working at INSERM U910, a medical genetics laboratory in Marseille.

== Research ==
Roubertoux is known for his research on the genetics of maternal and aggressive behavior in mice. He has also researched the effects of mitochondrial DNA changes on mouse behavior and neuroanatomy.

== Honors and awards ==
Roubertoux was president-elect of the Behavior Genetics Association (BGA) in 1995 when the organization's then-president, Glayde Whitney, gave a highly controversial presidential address. In it, Whitney argued that racial differences in rates of criminal activity may be due to genetic factors, and that behavior geneticists should investigate the roles of both genes and environment in such differences. Along with Wim Crusio, who was a member-at-large of the BGA's executive committee at the time, Roubertoux resigned from the organization in protest of what he considered their failure to enact sufficiently strong sanctions against Whitney for his address. He received the BGA's Dobzhansky Memorial Award in 2000, and served as its president from 2006 to 2008. In 2017, a study he co-authored on a mouse model of trisomy 21 received the BGA's Fulker Award, which is given to a "particularly meritorious paper" published in the organization's official journal, Behavior Genetics. He is a member of the BGA and the American Society of Human Genetics.
