= University of Orléans =

French university in Orléans created in 1966

- Type: Public
- Established: 1306; 720 years ago
- President: Ary Bruand
- Faculty: 1,203
- Total staff: 861
- Students: 20,083
- Location: Orléans, France; 47.8507°N 1.9340°E
- Campus: Orléans-la-Source
- Website: www.univ-orleans.fr

The University of Orléans (French: Université d'Orléans) is a French university, in the Academy of Orléans and Tours. As of July 2015 it is a member of the regional university association Leonardo da Vinci consolidated University.

== History ==
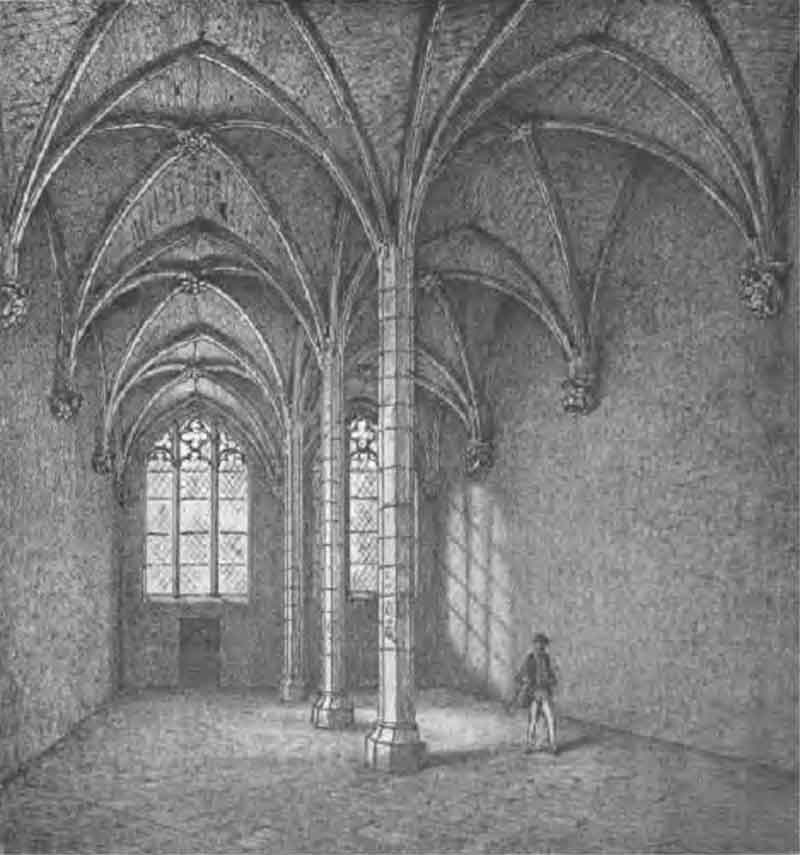
University of Orleans, Great Hall

In 1230, when for a time the doctors of the University of Paris were scattered, a number of the teachers and disciples took refuge in Orléans; when pope Boniface VIII, in 1298, promulgated the sixth book of the Decretals, he appointed the doctors of Bologna and the doctors of Orléans to comment upon it.

St. Yves (1253–1303) studied civil law at Orléans, and Pope Clement V also studied there law and letters; by a papal bull published at Lyon, 27 January 1306, he endowed the Orléans institutes with the title and privileges of a university.

Twelve later popes granted the new university many privileges. In the 14th century it had as many as five thousand students from France, Germany, Lorraine, Burgundy, Champagne, Picardy, Normandy, Touraine, Guyenne and Scotland.

The current university was founded in 1960, after its medieval predecessor was closed down in 1793 and merged into the University of France in 1808.

== Organisation ==
The university is organised into three Teaching and Research divisions (UFR):

- Law, Economics and Management
- Literature, Languages and Human Sciences
- Science and Technology

In addition, it has:

- 4 University Institutes of Technology
- 1 Science of the Universe Observatory
- 1 National Higher Institute of Teaching and Education
- 1 School of Engineering
- 1 School of Kinesiology

== Notable people ==
=== Faculty ===
==== Ancient ====
- Robert Joseph Pothier (1699–1722), lawyer.
- Daniel Jousse (1704–1781), lawyer.

==== Modern ====
- Pierre Roubertoux (born 1937) - behavioural geneticist.
- Jeanne Henriette Louis (born 1938) - professor emeritus of North American civilization
- Michel Cullin (1944 – 2020) - political scientist
- Morinobu Endo (born 1946) - Japanese physicist and chemist
- Christian Renoux (born 1960) - historian and an activist for nonviolence
- Nikolay Nenovsky (born 1963) - Bulgarian economist, working in the fields of monetary theory and policy
- Emmanuel Trélat (born 1974) - mathematician

=== Alumni ===
==== Ancient ====
- Emo of Friesland (c.1175–1237) - Frisian scholar and abbot
- Eustache Deschamps (1346 – 1406 or 1407) - poet
- Walter de Coventre (died 1371 or 1372) - Scottish ecclesiastic
- Walter Forrester (died 1425 or 1426) - Bishop of Brechin, Scotland
- Henry de Lichton (died 1440) - Scottish prelate and diplomat, Bishop of Moray and Bishop of Aberdeen
- Oliver King (c.1432 – 1503) - Bishop of Exeter and Bishop of Bath and Wells
- Michel Bucy (1484 – 1511) - Archbishop of Bourges
- John Calvin (1509–1564), influential French theologian, pastor and reformer during the Protestant Reformation
- Anne du Bourg (1521, Riom – 1559) - magistrate, Protestant martyr
- William Whittingham (c. 1524–1579) - English Puritan, translator of the Geneva Bible
- Claude Fauchet (1530 – 1602) - historian, antiquary, and pioneering romance philologist
- Anselmus de Boodt (Bruges, 1550 - 1632) - humanist, mineralogist, physician and naturalist
- François de Joyeuse (1562 – 1615) - churchman and politician
- Jørgen Bjelke (1621 – 1696) - Norwegian officer and nobleman
- Molière (1622–1673), French playwright and actor, considered to be one of the greatest masters of comedy in Western literature
- Pierre de Fermat (c. 1601 – 1665), best known for his Fermat's principle for light propagation and his Fermat's Last Theorem in number theory
- St Ivo of Kermartin (died 1303), patron of lawyers
- Étienne de Mornay, counsellor of Philippe IV le Bel
- Johannes Reuchlin (1455–1522)
- Guillaume Budé (1468–1540) - scholar and humanist
- Francis Bothwell, Procurator of the Scottish Nation at Orléans during 1513–1514, later a member of the Parliament of Scotland and a judge
- Étienne de La Boétie (1530–1563) - writer, poet, political theorist
- Thomas Brooke alias Cobham (1533–1578) - English nobleman, privateer, conspirator
- Agrippa d'Aubigné (1552–1630) - poet, soldier, propagandist
- Mathieu Molé (1584 – 1656) - statesman
- Théophraste Renaudot (1586–1653) - physician, philanthropist, journalist
- Charles Perrault (1628–1703) - author
- Johann Christoph Wagenseil (1633 - 1705) - German historian, Orientalist, jurist and Christian Hebraist
- Anthonie Heinsius (1641 – 1720) - Grand Pensionary of Holland
- Conrad von Reventlow (1644 – 1708) - Grand Chancellor of Denmark
- Jean de La Bruyère (1645–1696) - philosopher
- Jacques Pierre Brissot (1754 – 1793) - leading member of the Girondins
- Jacques Paul Migne (1800 – 1875) - theologian
- Jean-Eugène Robert-Houdin (1805 – 1871) - watchmaker, magician and illusionist
- Alphonse Magnien (1837 – 1902) - priest, theologian, academic administrator

==== Modern ====
- Michel Jébrak (born c.1948) - geologist
- Ibni Oumar Mahamat Saleh (1949 – disappeared 2008) politician and opposition leader Chad
- Thomas Boni Yayi (born 1951) - banker and politician, President of Benin
- Charles-Éric Lemaignen (born 1952) – politician LR, deputy mayor and president of Orléans
- François Bonneau (born 1953, in Amilly, Loiret) educationalist, politician SP
- Norbert-Bertrand Barbe - art historian, semiologist, artist and writer
- Hussein Hajj Hassan (born 1960) - politician and minister of industry Lebanon
- Olivier Carré (born 1961) - independent politician; mayor of the city of Orléans
- Patrick Grant (born 1972) - Scottish fashion designer and businessman
- Jeannette Bougrab (born 1973, in Déols) French lawyer and politician UMP

=== Recipients of honorary degree ===
- Isaac Ehrlich (born 1938, in Israel) - economist
- Horst Möller (born 1943, in Breslau) - German contemporary historian
- Józef Dulak (born 1962 in Nowy Sącz) - Polish scientist and professor of biological sciences

== See also ==
- List of medieval universities
- List of public universities in France by academy
- La Source, Orléans
