= Art museum =

Building or space for the exhibition of art

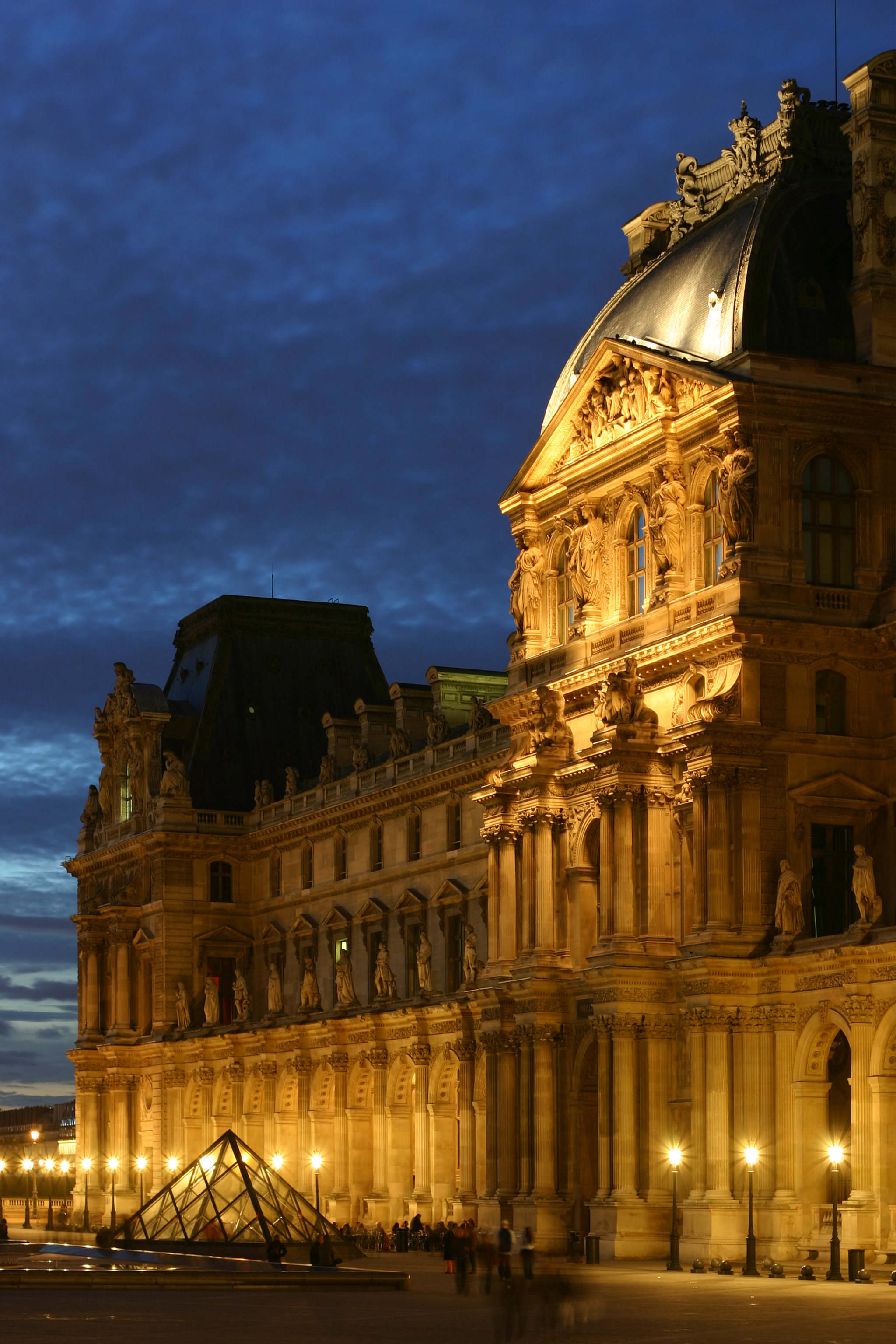
The Louvre in Paris, the most-visited art museum in the world in 2022.

Video of the National Gallery of Art in Washington D.C.

An art museum, or art gallery, is an organization, usually with buildings or spaces for the display of art from the museum's own collection. It might be in public or private ownership, be accessible to all, or have restrictions in place. Although primarily concerned with visual art, art museums are often used as a venue for other cultural exchanges and artistic activities, such as lectures, jewelry, performance arts, music concerts, or poetry readings. Art museums also frequently host themed temporary exhibitions, which often include items on loan from other collections.

== Terminology ==
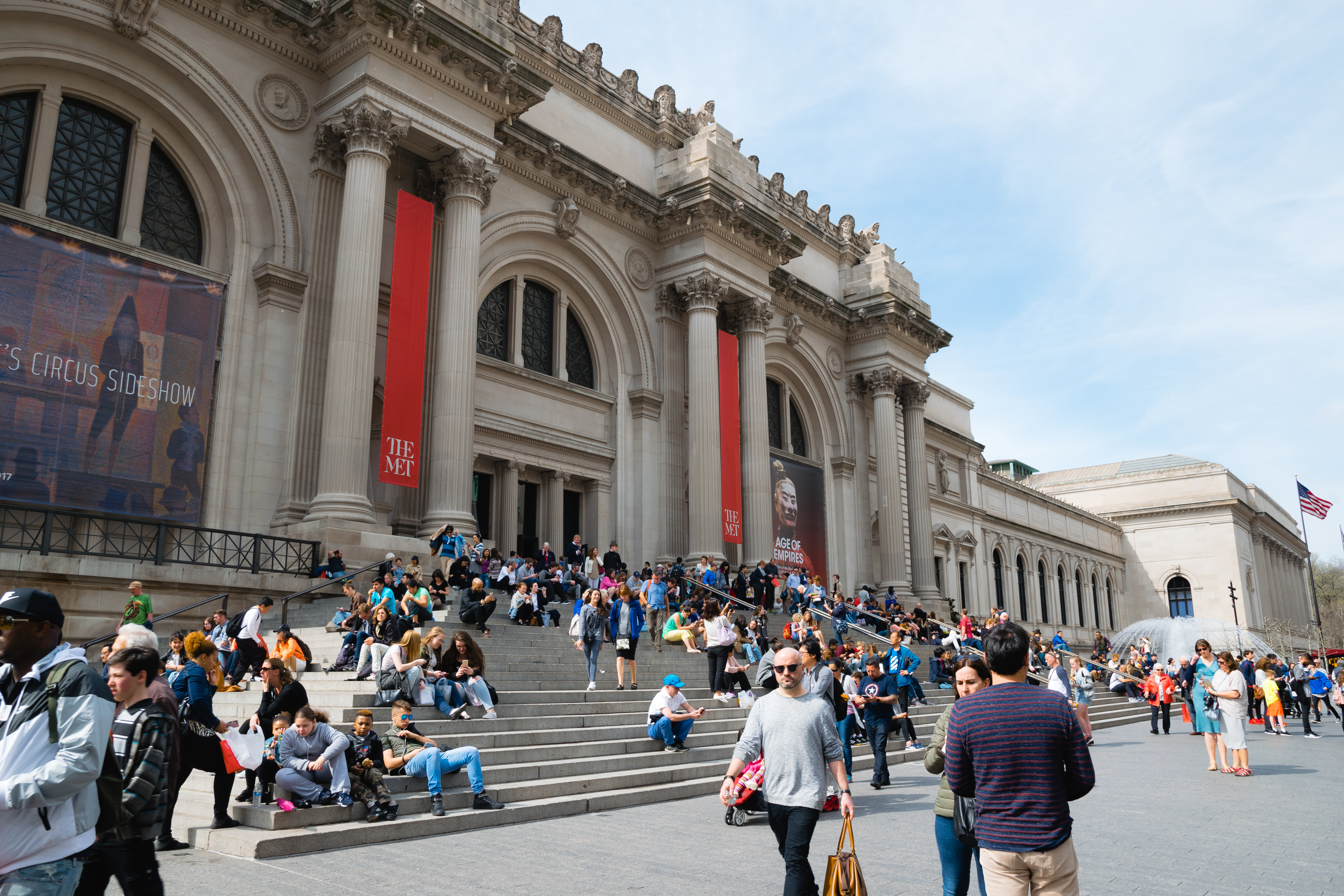
The Metropolitan Museum of Art in New York City, named for its central location on the Upper East Side of Manhattan, was the most-visited art museum in the United States and the eighth-most visited art museum in the world in 2022.

An institution dedicated to the display of art can be called an art museum or an art gallery, and the two terms may be used interchangeably. This is reflected in the names of institutions around the world, some of which are considered art galleries, such as the National Gallery in London and Neue Nationalgalerie in Berlin, and some of which are considered museums, including the Metropolitan Museum of Art and the Museum of Modern Art in New York City and the National Museum of Western Art in Tokyo.

The phrase "art gallery" is also sometimes used to describe businesses which display art for sale, but these are not art museums.

== History ==
=== Private collections ===
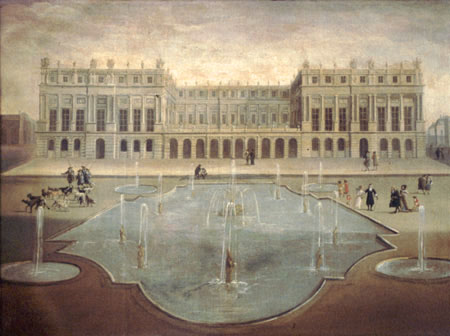
The art collection at the Palace of Versailles in France was periodically open for public viewing.

Throughout history, large and expensive works of art have generally been commissioned by religious institutions or political leaders and been displayed in temples, churches, and palaces. Although these collections of art were not open to the general public, they were often made available for viewing for a section of the public. In classical times, religious institutions began to function as an early form of art gallery. Wealthy Roman collectors of engraved gems and other precious objects, such as Julius Caesar, often donated their collections to temples. It is unclear how easy it was in practice for the public to view these items.

In Europe, from the Late Medieval period onwards, areas in royal palaces, castles, and large country houses of the social elite were often made partially accessible to sections of the public, where art collections could be viewed. At the Palace of Versailles, entrance was restricted to people of certain social classes who were required to wear the proper apparel, which typically included the appropriate accessories, silver shoe buckles and a sword, could be hired from shops outside. The treasuries of cathedrals and large churches, or parts of them, were often set out for public display and veneration. Many of the grander English country houses could be toured by the respectable for a tip to the housekeeper, during the long periods when the family were not in residence.

Special arrangements were made to allow the public to see many royal or private collections placed in galleries, as with most of the paintings of the Orleans Collection, which were housed in a wing of the Palais-Royal in Paris and could be visited for most of the 18th century. In Italy, the art tourism of the Grand Tour became a major industry from the 18th century onwards, and cities made efforts to make their key works accessible. The Capitoline Museums began in 1471 with a donation of classical sculpture to the city of Rome by the Papacy, while the Vatican Museums, whose collections are still owned by the Pope, trace their foundation to 1506, when the recently discovered Laocoön and His Sons was put on public display. A series of museums on different subjects were opened over subsequent centuries, and many of the buildings of the Vatican were purpose-built as galleries. An early royal treasury opened to the public was the Green Vault of the Kingdom of Saxony in the 1720s.

Privately funded museums open to the public began to be established from the 17th century onwards, often based around a collection of the cabinet of curiosities type. The first such museum was the Ashmolean Museum in Oxford, opened in 1683 to house and display the artefacts of Elias Ashmole that were given to Oxford University in a bequest.

=== Public museums ===
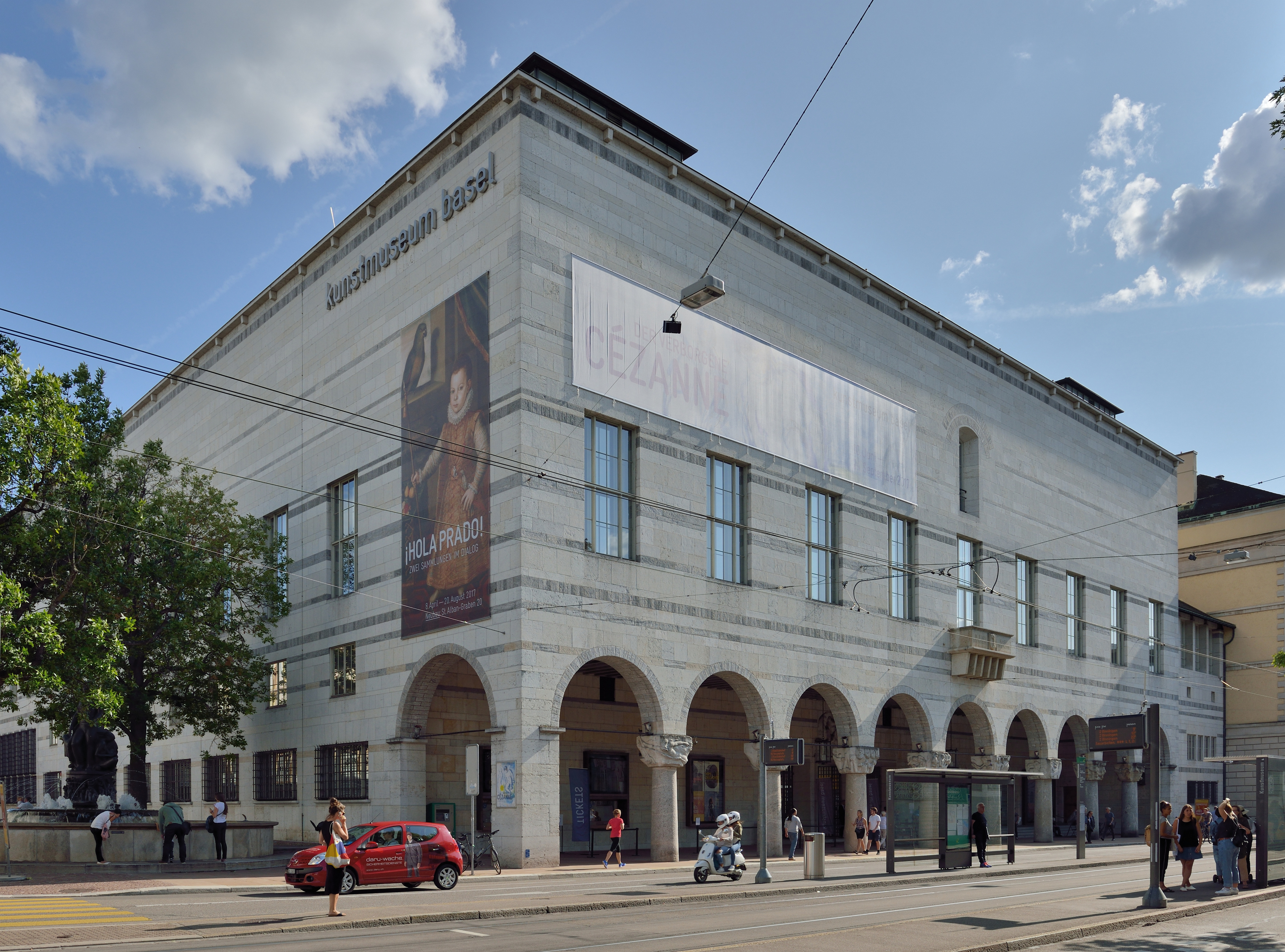
Kunstmuseum Basel, the world's first public art museum

The Kunstmuseum Basel, through its lineage which extends back to the Amerbach Cabinet, which included a collection of works by Hans Holbein the Younger and purchased by the city of Basel in 1661, is considered to be the first museum of art open to the public in the world.

In the second half of the 18th century, many private collections of art were opened to the public, and during and after the French Revolution and Napoleonic Wars, many royal collections were nationalized, even where the monarchy remained in place, as in Spain and Bavaria.

In 1753, the British Museum was established and the Old Royal Library collection of manuscripts was donated to it for public viewing. In 1777, a proposal to the British government was put forward by MP John Wilkes to buy the art collection of the late Sir Robert Walpole, who had amassed one of the greatest such collections in Europe, and house it in a specially built wing of the British Museum for public viewing. After much debate, the idea was eventually abandoned due to the great expense, and twenty years later, the collection was bought by Tsaritsa Catherine the Great of Russia and housed in the State Hermitage Museum in Saint Petersburg.

The Bavarian royal collection (now in the Alte Pinakothek, Munich) was opened to the public in 1779 and the Medici collection in Florence around 1789 (as the Uffizi Gallery). The opening of the Musée du Louvre during the French Revolution in 1793 as a public museum for much of the former French royal collection marked an important stage in the development of public access to art by transferring the ownership to a republican state; but it was a continuation of trends already well established.

The building now occupied by the Prado in Madrid was built before the French Revolution for the public display of parts of the royal art collection, and similar royal galleries were opened to the public in Vienna, Munich and other capitals. In Great Britain, however, the corresponding Royal Collection remained in the private hands of the monarch, and the first purpose-built national art galleries were the Dulwich Picture Gallery, founded in 1814 and the National Gallery, London opened to the public a decade later in 1824. Similarly, the National Gallery in Prague was not formed by opening an existing royal or princely art collection to the public, but was created from scratch as a joint project of some Czech aristocrats in 1796.

The Corcoran Gallery of Art in Washington, D.C. is generally considered to have been the first art museum in the United States. It was originally housed in the Renwick Gallery, built in 1859. Now a part of the Smithsonian Institution, the Renwick housed William Wilson Corcoran's collection of American and European art. The building was designed by James Renwick Jr. and finally completed in 1874. It is located at 1661 Pennsylvania Avenue NW. Renwick designed it after the Louvre's Tuileries addition. At the time of its construction, it was known as "the American Louvre".

=== University museums and galleries ===
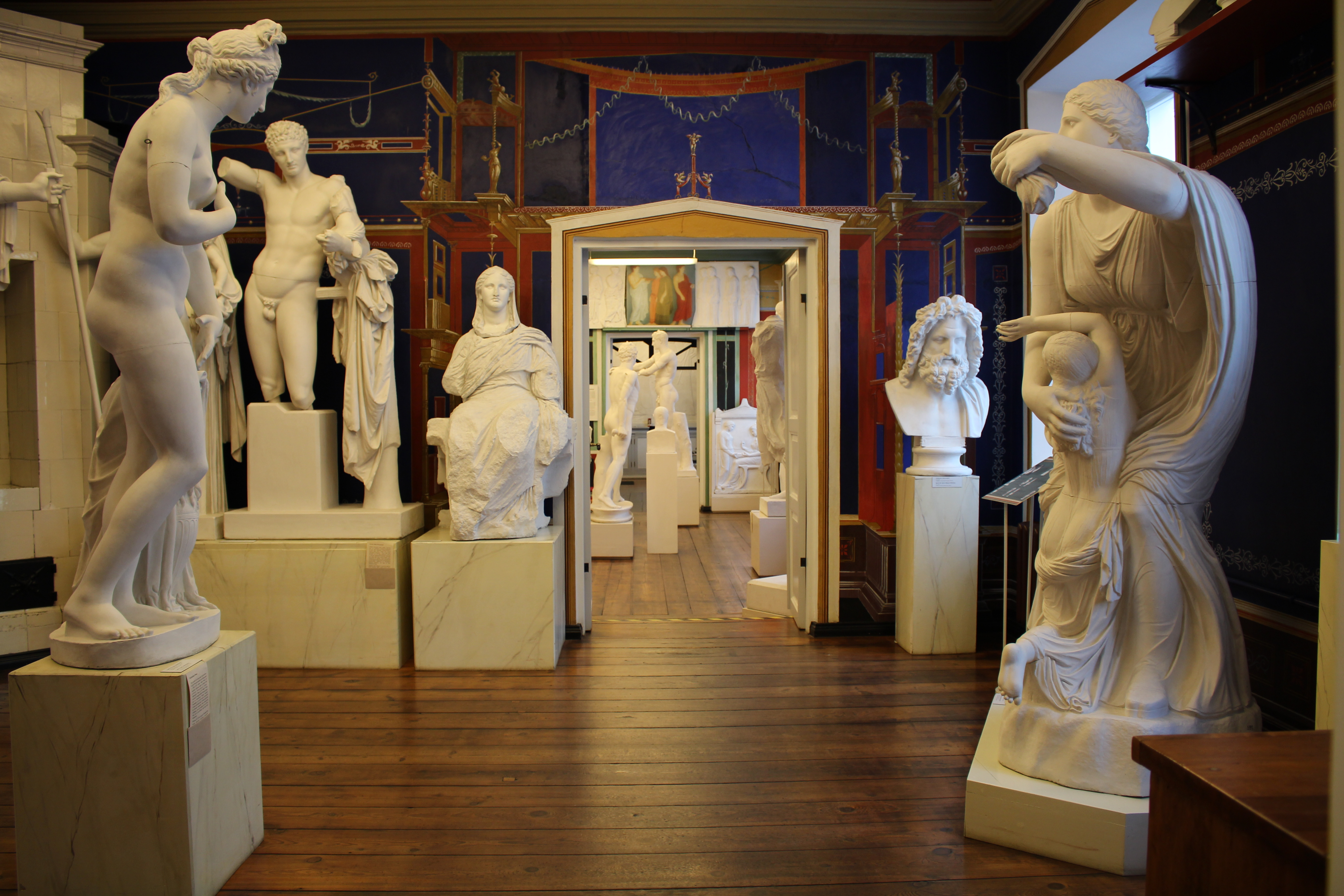
The University of Tartu's art museum, the oldest museum in Estonia

University art museums and galleries constitute collections of art developed, owned, and maintained by all kinds of schools, community colleges, colleges, and universities. This phenomenon exists in the West and East, making it a global practice. Although easily overlooked, there are over 700 university art museums in the US alone. This number, compared to other kinds of art museums, makes university art museums perhaps the largest category of art museums in the country. While the first of these collections can be traced to learning collections developed in art academies in Western Europe, they are now associated with and housed in centers of higher education of all types.

=== Galleries as a specific section in museums ===
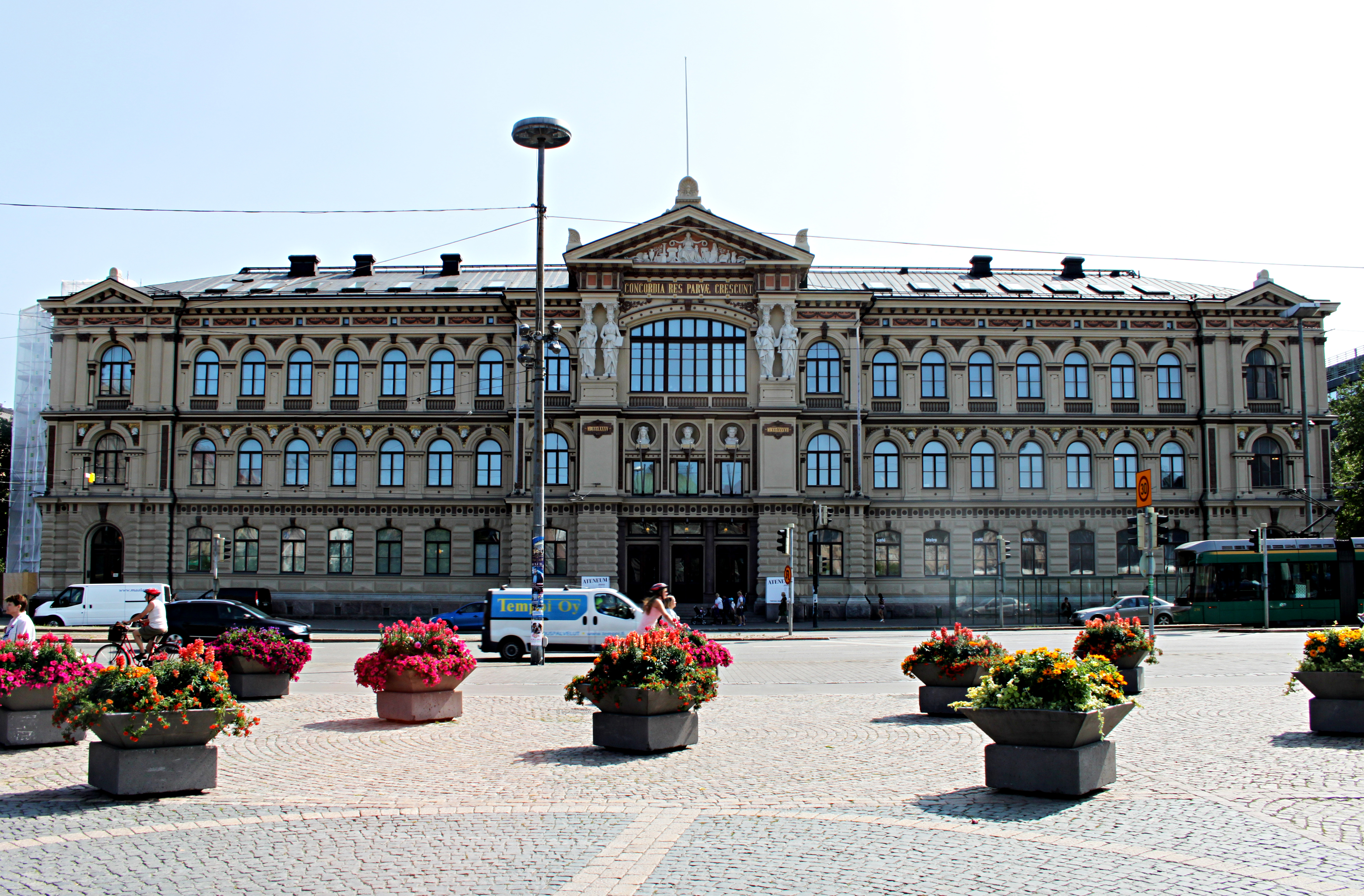
Ateneum, an art museum in Helsinki, Finland

The word gallery being originally an architectural term, the display rooms in museums are often called public galleries. Also frequently, a series of rooms dedicated to specific historic periods (e.g. Ancient Egypt) or other significant themed groupings of works (e.g. the gypsotheque or collection of plaster casts as in the Ashmolean Museum) within a museum with a more varied collection are referred to as specific galleries, e.g. Egyptian Gallery or Cast Gallery.

== Visual art not shown in a gallery ==
Works on paper, such as drawings, pastels, watercolors, prints, and photographs are typically not permanently displayed for reasons of conservation. Instead, public access to these materials is provided by a dedicated print room located within the museum. Murals or mosaics often remain where they have been created (in situ), although many have also been removed to galleries. Various forms of 20th-century art, such as land art and performance art, also usually exist outside a gallery. Photographic records of these kinds of art are often shown in galleries, however. Most museums and large art galleries own more works than they have room to display. The rest are held in reserve collections, on or off-site.

A sculpture garden is similar to an art gallery, presenting sculpture in an outdoor space. Sculpture has grown in popularity with sculptures installed in open spaces on both a permanent and temporary basis.

== Architecture ==
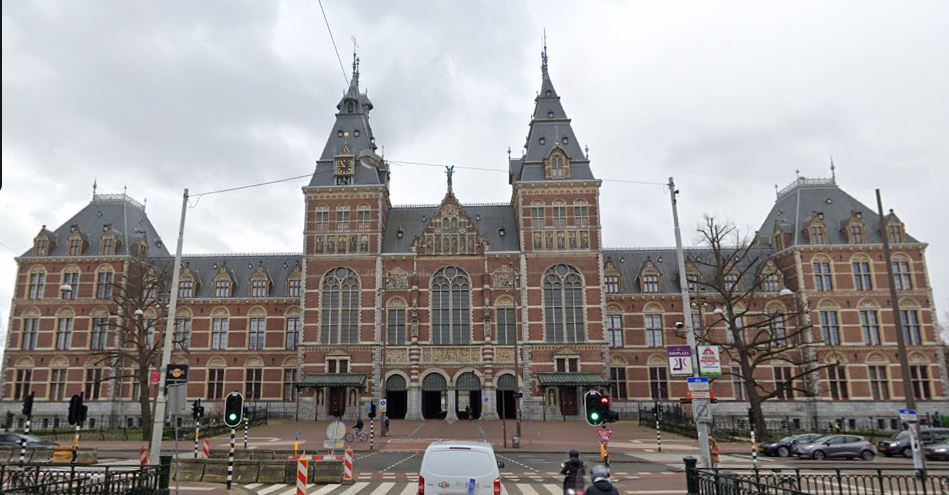
The Rijksmuseum in Amsterdam, the Netherlands

Most larger paintings from about 1530 onwards were designed to be seen either in churches or palaces, and many buildings built as palaces now function successfully as art museums. By the 18th century additions to palaces and country houses were sometimes intended specifically as galleries for viewing art, and designed with that in mind. The architectural form of the entire building solely intended to be an art gallery was arguably established by Sir John Soane with his design for the Dulwich Picture Gallery in 1817. This established the gallery as a series of interconnected rooms with largely uninterrupted wall spaces for hanging pictures and indirect lighting from skylights or roof lanterns.

The late 19th century saw a boom in the building of public art galleries in Europe and America, becoming an essential cultural feature of larger cities. More art galleries rose up alongside museums and public libraries as part of the municipal drive for literacy and public education.

Over the middle and late twentieth century, earlier architectural styles employed for art museums (such as the Beaux-Arts style of the Metropolitan Museum of Art in New York City or the Gothic and Renaissance Revival architecture of Amsterdam's Rijksmuseum) succumbed to modern styles, such as Deconstructivism. Examples of this trend include the Guggenheim Museum in New York City by Frank Lloyd Wright, the Guggenheim Museum Bilbao by Frank Gehry, Centre Pompidou-Metz by Shigeru Ban, and the redesign of the San Francisco Museum of Modern Art by Mario Botta. Some critics argue these galleries defeat their purposes because their dramatic interior spaces distract the eye from the paintings they are supposed to exhibit.

== Cultural aspects ==
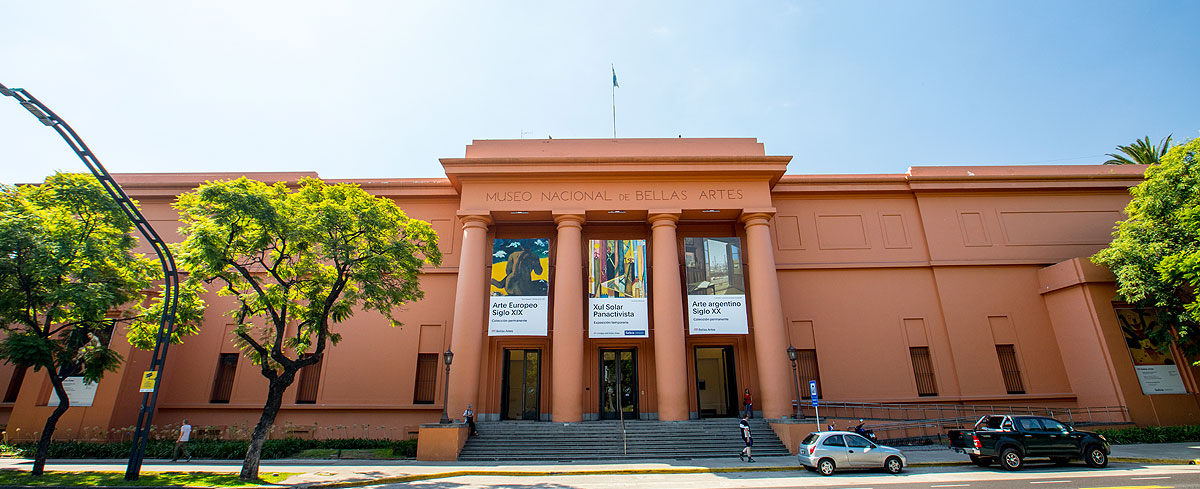
National Museum of Fine Arts in Buenos Aires, Argentina

Museums are more than just mere 'fixed structures designed to house collections.' Their purpose is to shape identity and memory, cultural heritage, distilled narratives and treasured stories. Many art museums throughout history have been designed with a cultural purpose or been subject to political intervention. In particular, national art galleries have been thought to incite feelings of nationalism. This has occurred in both democratic and non-democratic countries, although authoritarian regimes have historically exercised more control over administration of art museums. Ludwig Justi was for example dismissed as director of the Alte Nationalgalerie (Old National Gallery) in Berlin in 1933 by the new Nazi authorities for not being politically suitable.

The question of the place of the art museum in its community has long been under debate. Some see art museums as fundamentally elitist institutions, while others see them as institutions with the potential for societal education and uplift. John Cotton Dana, an American librarian and museum director, as well as the founder of the Newark Museum, saw the traditional art museum as a useless public institution, one that focused more on fashion and conformity rather than education and uplift. Indeed, Dana's ideal museum would be one best suited for active and vigorous use by the average citizen, located near the center of their daily movement. In addition, Dana's conception of the perfect museum included a wider variety of objects than the traditional art museum, including industrial tools and handicrafts that encourage imagination in areas traditionally considered mundane. This view of the art museum envisions it as one well-suited to an industrial world, indeed enhancing it. Dana viewed paintings and sculptures as much less useful than industrial products, comparing the museum to a department store. In addition, he encouraged the active lending-out of a museum's collected objects in order to enhance education at schools and to aid in the cultural development of individual members of the community. Finally, Dana saw branch museums throughout a city as a good method of making sure that every citizen has access to its benefits. Dana's view of the ideal museum sought to invest a wider variety of people in it, and was self-consciously not elitist.

Since the 1970s, a number of political theorists and social commentators have pointed to the political implications of art museums and social relations. Pierre Bourdieu, for instance, argued that in spite the apparent freedom of choice in the arts, people's artistic preferences (such as classical music, rock, traditional music) strongly tie in with their social position. So called cultural capital is a major factor in social mobility (for example, getting a higher-paid, higher-status job). The argument states that certain art museums are aimed at perpetuating aristocratic and upper class ideals of taste and excludes segments of society without the social opportunities to develop such interest. The fine arts thus perpetuate social inequality by creating divisions between different social groups. This argument also ties in with the Marxist theory of mystification and elite culture.

Furthermore, certain art galleries, such as the National Gallery in London and the Louvre in Paris are situated in buildings of considerable emotional impact. The Louvre in Paris is for instance located in the former Royal Castle of the ancient regime, and is thus clearly designed with a political agenda. It has been argued that such buildings create feelings of subjugation and adds to the mystification of fine arts. Research suggests that the context in which an artwork is being presented has significant influence on its reception by the audience, and viewers shown artworks in a museum rated them more highly than when displayed in a "laboratory" setting

== Online museums ==
=== Museums with major web presences ===
Most art museums have only limited online collections, but a few museums, as well as some libraries and government agencies, have developed substantial online catalogues. Museums, libraries, and government agencies with substantial online collections include:

- The British Museum has over 4,000,000 objects of all types available online, of which 1,018,471 have one or more images (as of June 2019).
- Library of Congress, prints (C19 on) and photographs collection (several million entries).
- Metropolitan Museum of Art has "406,000 hi-res images of public-domain works from the collection that can be downloaded, shared, and remixed without restriction".
- Rijksmuseum has 399,189 objects available online, of which 153,309 have one or more images.
- National Portrait Gallery, with over 215,000 works, 150,000 of which are illustrated, including paintings, prints and photographic portraits.
- MOMA (Museum of Modern Art), with holdings that include more than 150,000 individual pieces in addition to approximately 22,000 films.
- Boston Museum of Fine Arts, with over 330,000 works, most with images. Good for prints.
- Fine Art Museums of San Francisco, with over 85,000 works.
- Harvard Art Museums, with over 233,000 works online.
- Louvre, with over 80,000 works in various databases, with a large number of images, as well as another 140,000 drawings.
- National Gallery of Art, with over 108,000 works catalogued, though with only 6,000 images.
- (in French) The Mona Lisa Database of French Museums – Joconde *(from the French Ministry of Culture)
- Gallery Photoclass South Korea Art Gallery – since 2002
- Museum of Art & Photography (MAP), Bengaluru, India, with over 18,000+ artefacts online, including paintings, photographs, textiles, sculptures and prints.

=== Online art collections ===
There are a number of online art catalogues and galleries that have been developed independently of the support of any individual museum. Many of these, like American Art Gallery, are attempts to develop galleries of artwork that are encyclopedic or historical in focus, while others are commercial efforts to sell the work of contemporary artists.

A limited number of such sites have independent importance in the art world. The large auction houses, such as Sotheby's, Bonhams, and Christie's, maintain large online databases of art which they have auctioned or are auctioning. Bridgeman Art Library serves as a central source of reproductions of artwork, with access limited to museums, art dealers, and other professionals or professional organizations.

==== Folksonomy ====
There are also online galleries that have been developed by a collaboration of museums and galleries that are more interested with the categorization of art. They are interested in the potential use of folksonomy within museums and the requirements for post-processing of terms that have been gathered, both to test their utility and to deploy them in useful ways.

The steve.museum is one example of a site that is experimenting with this collaborative philosophy. The participating institutions include the Guggenheim Museum, the Cleveland Museum of Art, the Metropolitan Museum of Art, and the San Francisco Museum of Modern Art.

== Museum lists ==
- List of museums (listing links to articles on many specific museums, worldwide, sorted by country)
- List of most visited museums
- List of most visited art museums
- List of most visited museums by region
- List of largest art museums in the world

=== International and national lists ===
- World: World Heritage Site (s) (per UNESCO)
- World (modern art): Museums of modern art
- Latin America: Museums in Latin America, on the website of the Latin American Network Information Center (LANIC) of the University of Texas at Austin
- United States: Category:Institutions accredited by the American Alliance of Museums, alphabetical list with links.
- United States: ART MUSEUMS, ART CENTERS, and NON-PROFIT ART ORGANIZATIONS web page, sorted by state, on the website Art Collecting.com.
- United States: Museums page, listing (with links) the national museums of the United States, in the "History, Arts, and Culture" subsection of the "Citizens" section of the U.S. federal government's general information website USA.gov

== Organizations ==
There are relatively few local/regional/national organizations dedicated specifically to art museums. Most art museums are associated with local/regional/national organizations for the arts, humanities or museums in general. Many of these organizations are listed as follows:

=== International and topical organizations ===
- UNESCO – the United Nations Educational, Scientific and Cultural Organization—the leading global organization for the preservation and presentation of world cultures and arts.
- International Council of Museums
- Association of Art Historians
- Association of Art Museum Curators
- Association of Art Museum Directors
- Independent Curators International
- International Association of Curators of Contemporary Art (IKT)
- College Art Association (CAA)
- Small Museum Association, an all-volunteer organization serving small museums in the mid-Atlantic region and beyond.
- North American Reciprocal Museum Association (NARM)
- The Artists' Materials Center: An applied research organization at Carnegie Mellon University dedicated to helping museums, libraries, and archives improve the ways of caring for their collections.
- International Centre for the Study of the Preservation and Restoration of Cultural Property (ICCROM): an intergovernmental organization dedicated to the conservation of cultural heritage.
- International Institute for Conservation of Historic and Artistic Works (IIC)

=== National organizations ===
- Australia: Australian Museums and Galleries Association
- Canada: Canadian Art Museum Directors Organization (CAMDO)
- Canada: Canadian Museums Association
- Japan: Japan Association of Art Museums (English language page)
- Japan: Japanese Association of Museums (English language page)
- United States: American Alliance of Museums, formerly the American Association of Museums
- United States: American Federation of Arts
- United States: National Art Education Association, and specifically their Museum Education Division
- United States: American Institute for Conservation of Historic and Artistic Works (AIC)
- United Kingdom: The Museums Association (MA) is a professional membership organisation based in London for museum, gallery, and heritage professionals, museums, galleries and heritage organisations, and companies that work in the museum, gallery, and heritage sector of the United Kingdom. It also offers international membership. Started in 1889, it is the oldest museum association in the world, and has over 5,000 individual members, 600 institutional members, and 250 corporate members.

=== Other organizations (for multiple museums) ===
==== Regional, provincial, and state museum organizations ====
- Canada, Ontario: Ontario Museum Association and Ontario Association of Art Galleries
- United States, western states: Western Museums Association
- United States, western states: Museums West Consortium, an association of 13 museums of the American West.
- United States, western states: Western Association for Art Conservation (WAAC)
- United States, California: California Association of Museums
- United States, Florida: Florida Art Museum Directors Association—an affiliate of the Florida Association of Museums

==== District, local and community museum organizations ====
- United States, Washington DC: Smithsonian Institution, the official national museum, and controlling organization for most major art and cultural museums in Washington, D.C., national museums with major art collections, as well as other national historic and cultural facilities nationwide. The Smithsonian also—directly or indirectly, and through traveling exhibits—coordinates some federal government support of museums (art and other), nationally. Also partners with many museums throughout the United States, each designated as a "Smithsonian Affiliate" institution.
- United States, Florida, Miami Miami Art Museums Alliance
- United States, New Mexico, Taos: Taos art colony
- United States, New York, New York City: Art Museum Partnership
- United States, New York, New York City: Museums Council of New York City
- United States, Texas, Houston: Houston Museum District Association

== See also ==
- Art exhibition
- Artist cooperative
- Artist-run initiative
- Artist-run space
- Arts centre
- Contemporary art gallery
- List of largest art museums
- List of most visited art museums
- List of national galleries
- List of single-artist museums
- Pop-up exhibition
- Vanity gallery
- Virtual museum
