= List of most-visited museums in the United States =

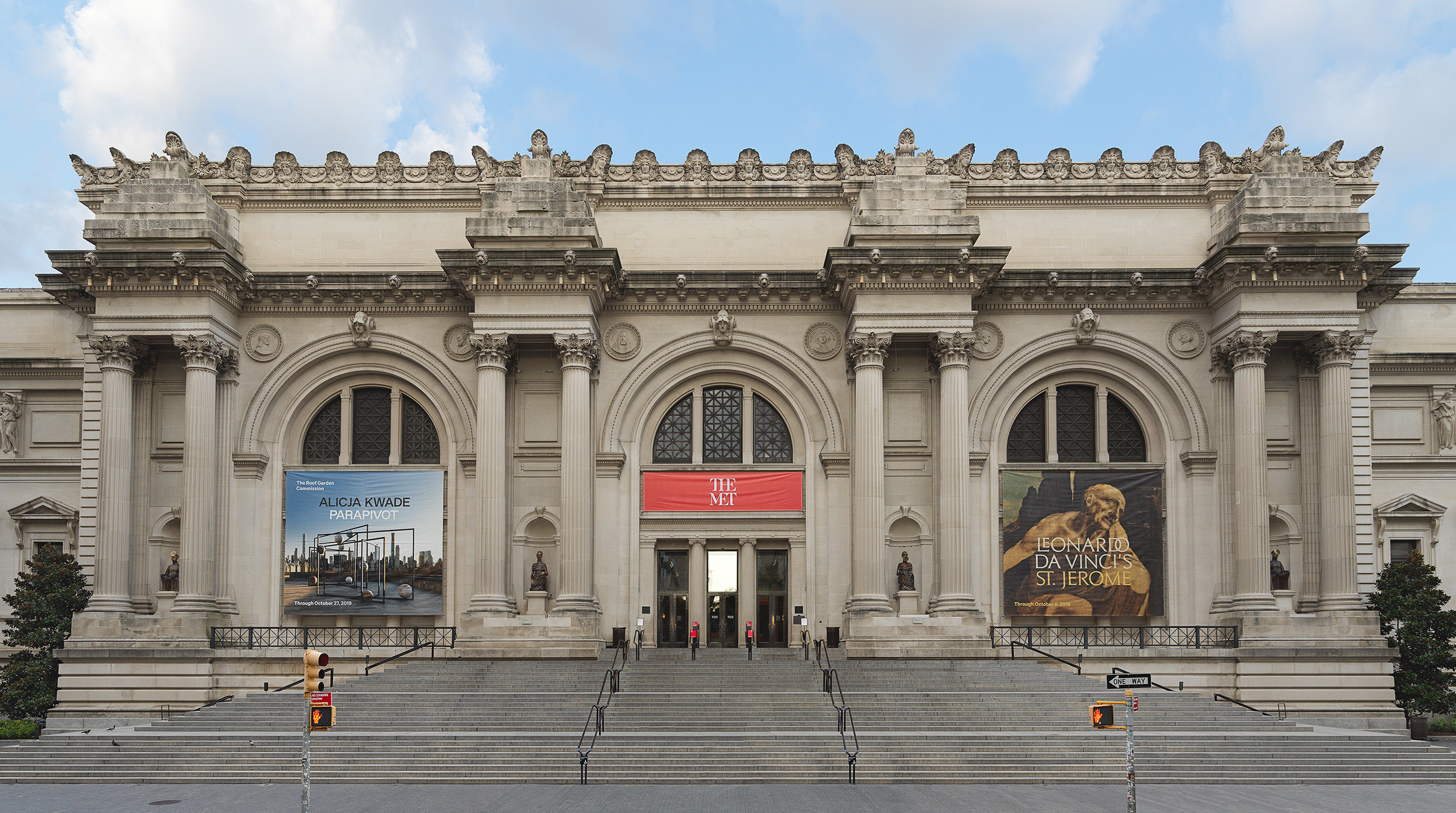
Metropolitan Museum of Art, New York City

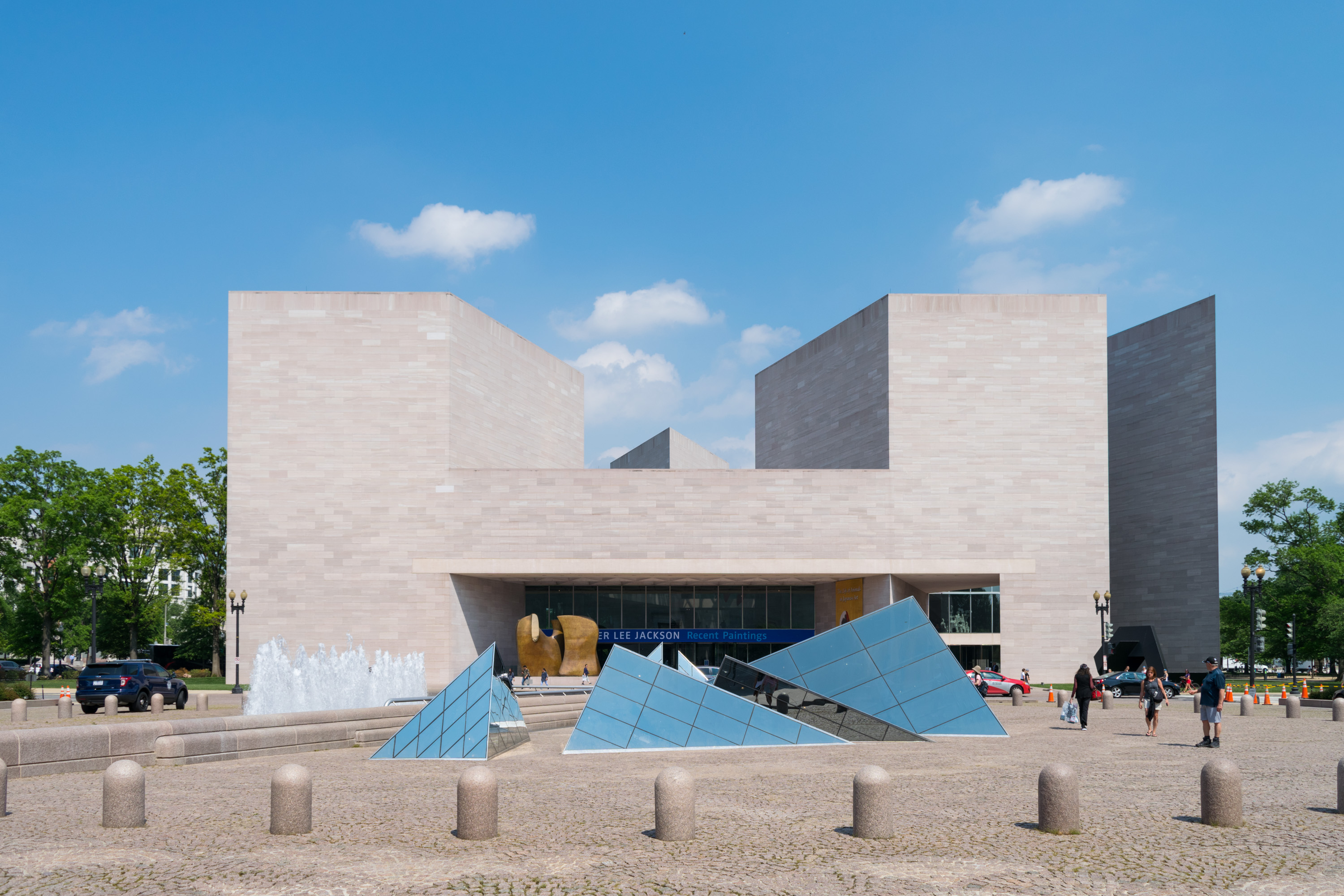
National Gallery of Art, East Building, Washington DC

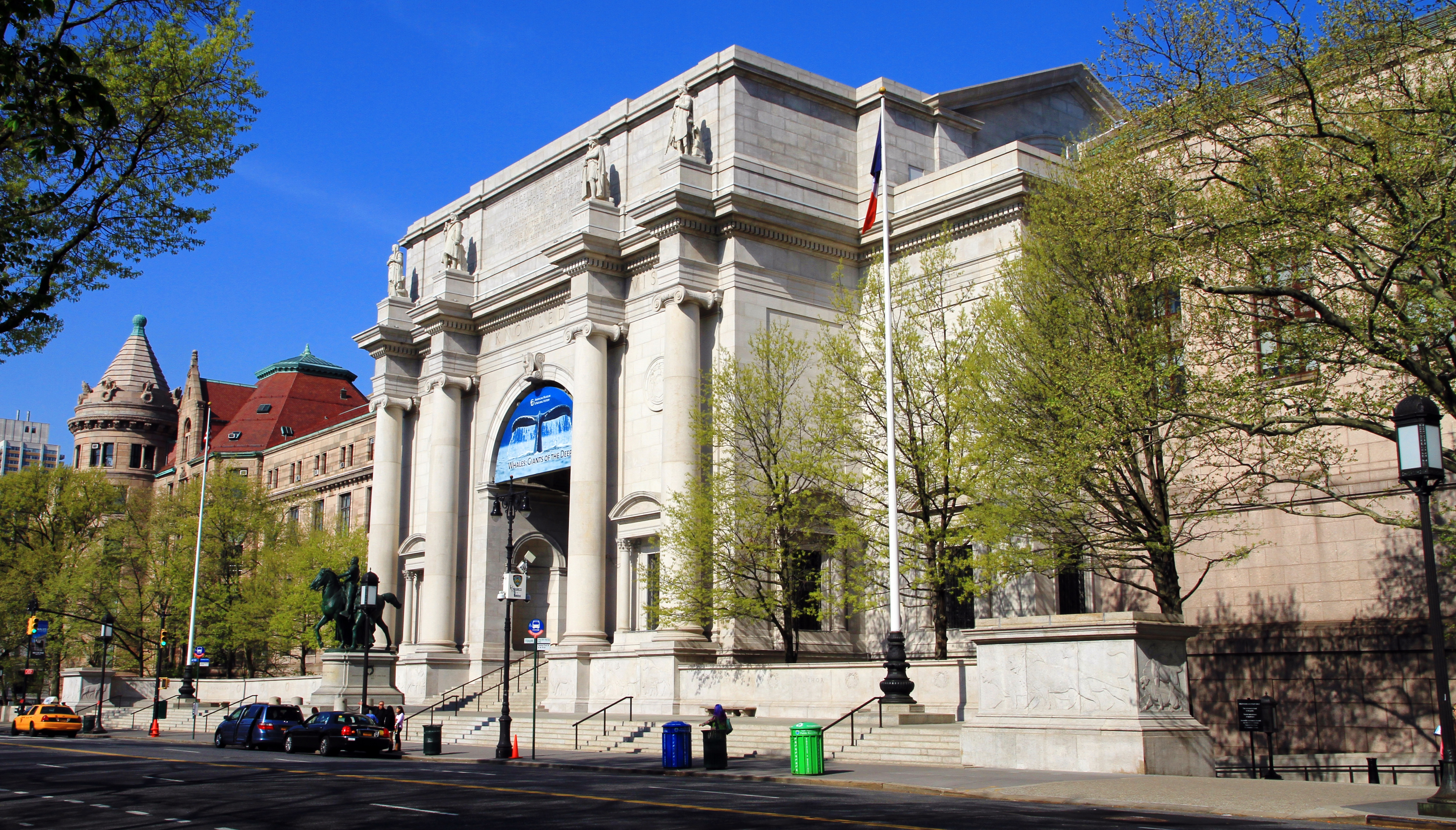
American Museum of Natural History, New York City

This is a list of the most-visited museums in the United States in 2025 or 2024. It is based upon the statistics of the Smithsonian Institution Newsroom (January 2025), the annual surveys of museum attendance by the Art Newspaper published in March 2025 and March 2026, the TEA Global Experience Index for 2024 (published October 2025), and museum sources.

Rank	Museum	Location	Visitors	Year
(1)	Metropolitan Museum of Art	New York City	5,984,091	2025
(2)	American Museum of Natural History	New York City	5,400,000	2024
(3)	National Gallery of Art	Washington, D.C.	3,936,543	2024
(4)	National Museum of Natural History	Washington, D.C.	3,900,000	2024
(5)	National Air and Space Museum (with Udvar-Hazy Center)	Washington, D.C.	3,100,000	2024
(6)	Museum of Modern Art	New York City	2,657,377	2024
(7)	National 9/11 Museum	New York City	2,400,000	2024
(8)	National Museum of American History	Washington, D.C.	2,100,000	2024
(9)	California Science Center	Los Angeles	1,700,000	2024
(10)	National Museum of African American History and Culture	Washington, D.C.	1,600,000	2024
(11)	Houston Museum of Natural Science	Houston	1,547,000	2024
(12)	Griffin Museum of Science and Industry	Chicago	1,476,000	2024
(13)	Denver Museum of Nature and Science	Denver	1,350,000	2024
(14)	Art Institute of Chicago	Chicago	1,324,241	2024
(15)	Museum of Science	Boston	1,324,000	2024
(16)	Getty Center	Los Angeles	1,301,332	2024
(17)	Smithsonian American Art Museum (with Renwick Gallery)	Washington, D.C.	1,273,450	2024
(18)	Natural History Museum of Los Angeles County (with the George C. Page and William S. Hart museums)	Los Angeles	1,200,000	2023
(19)	Huntington Library	San Marino, California	1,152,416	2024
(20)	Field Museum of Natural History	Chicago	1,018,002	2022
(21)	De Young Museum	San Francisco	999,645	2023
(22)	Museum of Fine Arts	Boston	988,911	2024
(23)	California Academy of Sciences	San Francisco	966,000	2022
(24)	Whitney Museum of American Art	New York City	888,816	2024
(25)	Los Angeles County Museum of Art	Los Angeles	873,825	2024
(26)	Solomon Guggenheim Museum	New York City	861,374	2023
(27)	Houston Museum of Fine Arts	Houston	854,684	2024
(28)	Frederik Meijer Gardens & Sculpture Park	Grand Rapids, Michigan	851,626	2024
(29)	Perot Museum of Nature and Science	Dallas	849,329	2023
(30)	The Broad	Los Angeles	846,500	2024
(31)	Crystal Bridges Museum of American Art	Bentonville, Arkansas	784,971	2023
(32)	Hirshhorn Museum and Sculpture Garden	Washington, D.C.	714,684	2023
(33)	National Museum of the American Indian	Washington, D.C.	704,074	2023
(34)	Cleveland Museum of Art	Cleveland	685,336	2023
(35)	Denver Art Museum	Denver	656,342	2022
(36)	Philadelphia Museum of Art	Philadelphia, Pennsylvania	649,204	2024
(37)	North Carolina Museum of Natural Sciences	Raleigh, North Carolina	617,375	2022
(38)	Detroit Institute of Arts Museum	Detroit	600,000	2023
(39)	Minneapolis Institute of Art	Minneapolis	591,069	2022
(40)	Milwaukee Public Museum	Milwaukee	549,670	2023
(41)	The Museum of Flight	Seattle	445,538	2023
(42)	Pacific Science Center	Seattle	410,000	2022
(43)	Fernbank Museum of Natural History	Atlanta	408,000	2023

== See also ==
- List of largest art museums
- List of most-visited art museums
- List of most-visited museums
- List of most-visited museums by region
- List of most visited museums in the Netherlands
- List of most visited museums in the United Kingdom
- List of most visited palaces and monuments
