= List of most-visited museums =

This is a list of the most-visited museums in the world in 2024, with 2025 figures where they have been published. Primary sources include annual attendance statistics in the Art Newspaper (2025 and 2026), the TEA Global Experience Index for 2024, published October 2025, the annual report of the National Cultural Heritage Administration of the Chinese Government, the Smithsonian News Desk in the United States, the annual report of the Association of Leading Visitor Attractions in the United Kingdom, and museum websites.

Palace Museum, Beijing, China

Summer Palace, Beijing, China

Emperor Qin Shihuang’s Museum, Xi'an, China

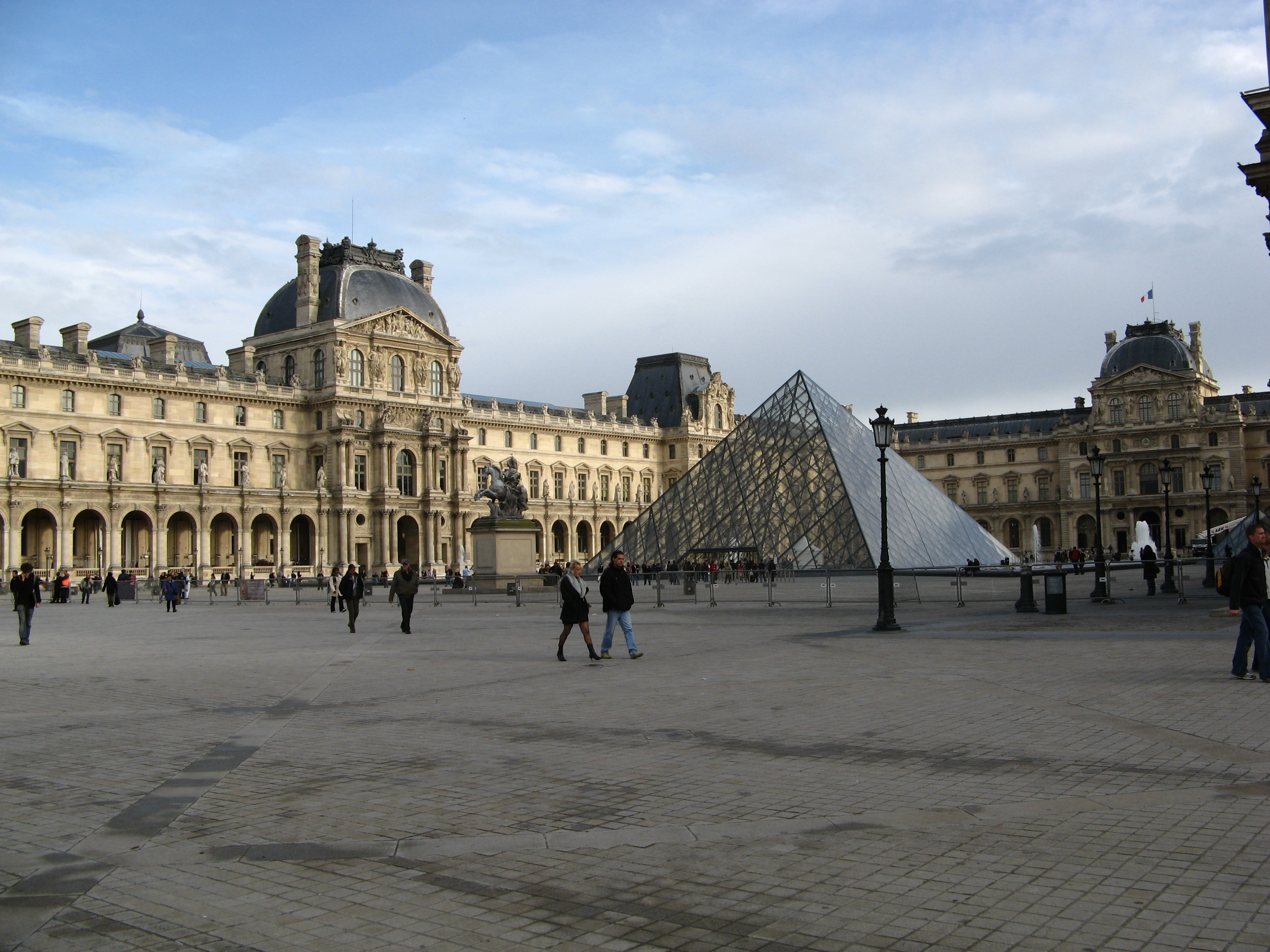
Musée du Louvre, Paris, France

== List of most-visited museums ==
Name	Visitors	City	Country
Palace Museum	19,000,000 (2025)	Beijing	China
Summer Palace	17,381,000 (2025)	Beijing	China
Emperor Qin Shihuang’s Museum	17,381,000 (2025)	Xi’an	China
Louvre	9,000,000 (2025)	Paris	France
Palace of Versailles	8,400,000 (2025)	Paris	France
Nanshan Museum	7,455,000 (2025)	Shenzhen	China
Natural History Museum	7,117,000 (2025)	London	United Kingdom
Vatican Museums	6,934,000 (2025)	Vatican City	Vatican
Opium War Museum	6,929,000 (2025)	Dongguan	China
National Museum of China	6,900,000 (2025)	Beijing	China
Gyeongbokgung Palace	6,887,000 (2025)	Seoul	South Korea
National Museum of Korea	6,507,483 (2025)	Seoul	South Korea
British Museum	6,440,120 (2025)	London	United Kingdom
Prince Gong's Mansion	6,120,000 (2025)	Beijing	China
Sanxingdui Museum	6,080,000 (2025)	Guanghan	China
Chengdu Wuhou Shrine Museum	6,030,000 (2025)	Chengdu	China
Metropolitan Museum of Art	5,984,091 (2025)	New York City	United States
Nanjing Museum	5,860,000 (2025)	Nanjing	China
Shenyang Palace Museum	5,852,000 (2025)	Shenyang	China
China Science and Technology Museum	5,530,000 (2025)	Beijing	China
American Museum of Natural History	5,400,000 (2024)	New York City	United States
Tate Modern	4,603,025 (2024)	London	United Kingdom
Hubei Provincial Museum	4,356,943 (2024)	Wuhan	China
Shanghai Museum East	4,230,000 (2024)	Shanghai	China
National Gallery of Art	3,936,543 (2024)	Washington, D.C.	United States
National Museum of Natural History	3,900,000 (2024)	Washington, D.C.	United States
Musée d'Orsay	3,751,000 (including Musée de l'Orangerie) (2024)	Paris	France
National Museum of Anthropology	3,700,000 (2024)	Mexico City	Mexico
State Russian Museum	5,087,276 (2025)	Saint Petersburg	Russia
State Hermitage Museum	3,846,375 (2025)	Saint Petersburg	Russia
Victoria and Albert Museum	3,525,700 (2024)	London, South Kensington	United Kingdom
Prado Museum	3,457,057 (2024)	Madrid	Spain
Centre Pompidou	3,204,369 (2024)	Paris	France
National Gallery	3,203,451 (2024)	London	United Kingdom
Musée National d'Histoire Naturelle	3.2 million (2024)	Paris	France
National Air and Space Museum (Note: Includes visitors to the Udvar-Hazy Center.)	3,100,000 (2024)	Washington, D.C.	United States
Mevlana Museum	3,048,000 (2024)	Konya	Turkey
Galleria degli Uffizi	2,908,828 (2024)	Florence	Italy
National Museum of Natural Science	2,854,455 (2024)	Taichung	Taiwan
London Science Museum	2,827,242 (2024)	London	United Kingdom
Museum of Modern Art	2,657,377 (2024)	New York City	United States
National Museum of Nature and Science	2,634,997 (2024)	Tokyo	Japan
M+	2.61 million (2024)	Hong Kong	Hong Kong
State Tretyakov Gallery	3,075,976 (2025)	Moscow	Russia
Rijksmuseum	2,500,000 (2024)	Amsterdam	Netherlands
Tokyo National Museum	2,460,000 (2024)	Tokyo	Japan
National 9/11 Museum	2,400,000 (2024)	New York City	United States
Art Gallery of NSW	2,369,339 (2024)	Sydney	Australia
National Museum of Scotland	2,314,974 (2024)	Edinburgh	United Kingdom
Royal Museums Greenwich	2,255,753 (2024)	London	United Kingdom
Galleria dell'Accademia	2,189,103 (2024)	Florence	Italy
Smithsonian Museum of American History	2,100,000 (2024)	Washington, D.C.	United States
National Gallery Singapore	2,040,481 (2024)	Singapore	Singapore
21st Century Museum of Contemporary Art	1,974,773 (2023)	Kanazawa	Japan
National Science and Technology Museum	1,875,372 (2023)	Kaohsiung	Taiwan
National Palace Museum	1,874,994 (2024)	Taipei	Taiwan
National Museum in Kraków	1,859,484 (2024)	Kraków	Poland
Van Gogh Museum	1,840,000 (2024)	Amsterdam	Netherlands
The National Art Center, Tokyo	1,755,036	Tokyo	Japan
California Science Center	1,700,000 (2024)	Los Angeles	United States
China National Silk Museum	1,692,697 (2023)	Hangzhou	China
Kunsthistorisches Museum	1,688,509	Vienna	Austria
Fujian Museum	1,676,973 (2023)	Fuzhou	China
Hangzhou Arts and Crafts Museum	1,641,226 (2023)	Hangzhou	China
National Museum of African American History and Culture	1,600,000 (2024)	Washington, D.C.	United States
National Gallery of Victoria	1,580,303	Melbourne	Australia
Houston Museum of Natural Science	1,547,000 (2024)	Houston	United States
National Museum in Warsaw	1,500,655 (2024)	Warsaw	Poland
Louis Vuitton Foundation	1,500,000 (2023)	Paris	France
Griffin Museum of Science and Industry	1,476,000 (2024)	Chicago	United States
Kaohsiung Museum of Fine Arts	1,461,406	Kaohsiung	Taiwan
Acropolis Museum	1,451,727	Athens	Greece
Centro Cultural Banco do Brasil	1,364,208	São Paulo	Brazil
Denver Museum of Nature and Science	1,350,000 (2024)	Denver	United States
Art Institute of Chicago	1,324,241 (2024)	Chicago	United States
Museum of Science	1,324,000 (2024)	Boston	United States
Palacio de Cristal del Retiro	1,318,823 (Note: Does not include visitors to the main Reina Sofía museum.)	Madrid	Spain
Guggenheim Museum Bilbao	1,301,343 (2024)	Bilbao	Spain
Getty Center	1,301,332 (2024)	Los Angeles	United States
Chinese Aviation Museum	1,292,278 (2023)	Beijing	China
Smithsonian American Art Museum (with Renwick Gallery)	1,273,450 (2024)	Washington, D.C.	United States
Moscow Kremlin Museum	1,240,113 (2025)	Moscow	Russia

== Criteria ==
This list includes art museums, cultural museums, history museums, natural history museums, and science museums with an attendance of over 1,250,000 people in 2022, but does not include archaeological sites, historical monuments, or most palace museums.

For example, the Palace Museum in Beijing (17,000,000 visitors in 2024) is not included, nor the Chengdu-Wuhou Mausoleum Site (14,500,570) and Emperor Quin-shi-Huang Mausoleum in Xian (11,610,000 visitors in 2024) nor are the Forbidden City, Kremlin, and Palace of Versailles are not included, though the Louvre and Hermitage are included.

Due to differences in reporting across regions, there is some variation in the time periods for which figures are reported. Figures for North America and continental Europe are generally calendar-year figures, while most figures for Britain and the Asia-Pacific are fiscal year figures, from April through March.

== See also ==
- List of most-visited art museums
- List of most-visited museums by region
- List of largest art museums
- List of most visited palaces and monuments
- List of most visited museums in the Netherlands
- List of most visited museums in the United Kingdom
- List of most-visited museums in the United States
- List of most-visited museums in France
