= List of most-visited museums by region =

This is a list of the most visited museums in each region in 2023, based upon the annual reports of museum attendance from the Art Newspaper Review, and from official national sources. If 2023 figures are not available, earlier figures are shown, with the year indicated.

== Asia ==
Asia - Top twenty museums by number of visitors per year
Name	City	Visitors annually	Country	Year reported
National Museum of China	Beijing	6,757,000	China	2023
China Science and Technology Museum	Beijing	5,315,000	China	2023
Nanjing Museum	Nanjing	5,007,000	China	2023
Suzhou Museum	Suzhou	4,852,000	China	2023
Hunan Museum	Hunan	4,852,000	China	2023
Hubei Provincial Museum	Hubei	4,300,000	China	2023
National Museum of Korea	Seoul	4,180,000	South Korea	2023
Mevlana Museum	Konya	3,300,000	Turkey	2023
National Museum of Natural Science	Taichung	2,738,000	Taiwan	2023
M+	Hong Kong	2,798,000	Hong Kong	2023
National Museum of Modern and Contemporary Art	Seoul	1,806,641	South Korea	2022
Tokyo Metropolitan Art Museum	Tokyo	1,924,456	Japan	2023
The National Art Center, Tokyo	Tokyo	2,250,758	Japan	2023
Tokyo National Museum	Tokyo	1,372,132	Japan	2022
National Gallery Singapore	Singapore	1,723,916	Singapore	2023
Shanghai Science and Technology Museum	Shanghai	494,000	China	2022
National Palace Museum^{[iii]}	Taipei	1,040,000	Taiwan	2022
Zhejiang Provincial Museum	Hangzhou	874,000	China	2022
National Taiwan Science Education Center	Taipei	2,468,000	Taiwan	2023
Shaanxi History Museum	Xi'an	1,000,000	China	2020

== Europe ==
Europe - Top museums by number of visitors in 2023
Name	City	Visitors per year	Country	Year reported
Louvre	Paris	8,900,000	France	2023
Vatican Museums	Vatican City	6,800,000	Vatican	2023
British Museum	London	5,820,860	United Kingdom	2023
Natural History Museum	London	5,688,608	United Kingdom	2023
Musée d'Orsay	Paris	5,200,000	France	2023
Galleria degli Uffizi	Florence	5,138,588	Italy	2023
Tate Modern	London	4,742,038	United Kingdom	2023
State Hermitage Museum	Saint Petersburg	3,274,000	Russia	2023
Victoria and Albert Museum	London	3,110,000	United Kingdom	2023
Centre Pompidou	Paris	3,009,570	France	2023
London Science Museum	London	2,957,000	United Kingdom	2023
National Gallery	London	2,727,119	United Kingdom	2023
Rijksmuseum	Amsterdam	2,702,824	Netherlands	2023
Museo del Prado	Madrid	2,456,724	Spain	2023
Tretyakov Gallery	Moscow	2,100,000	Russia	2023
Galleria dell'Accademia	Florence	2,013,974	Italy	2023
National Museum in Warsaw	Warsaw	2,000,000	Poland	2023
Cité des Sciences et de l'Industrie	Paris	1,992,823	France	2022
Van Gogh Museum	Amsterdam	1,686,766	Netherlands	2023
National Museum in Kraków	Kraków	1,600,000	Poland	2023
Reina Sofía	Madrid	1,514,854	Spain	2023
Galata Tower	Istanbul	1,300,000	Turkey	2023

== North America ==
Name	City	Visitors per year	Country	Year reported
Metropolitan Museum of Art	New York City	5,727,000	United States	2024
National Museum of Natural History	Washington, D.C.	5,400,000	United States	2024
National Gallery of Art	Washington, D.C.	3,937,000	United States	2024
Museum of Modern Art	New York City	2,657,000	United States	2024
Smithsonian Museum of American History	Washington, D.C.	3,900,000	United States	2024
National Air and Space Museum (with Steven F. Udvar-Hazy Center)	Washington, D.C.	1,900,000	United States	2025
National Museum of African American History and Culture	Washington, D.C.	1,600,000	United States	2024
Art Institute of Chicago	Chicago	1,324,000	United States	2024
Los Angeles County Museum of Art	Los Angeles	902,237	United States	2022
Getty Center	Los Angeles	989,302	United States	2022
Royal Ontario Museum		1,100,000	Canada	2024
Art Gallery of Ontario	Toronto	1,000,000	Canada	2025
National Gallery of Canada	Ottawa	165,854	Canada	2022
National Museum of Anthropology	Mexico City	5,048,893	Mexico	2025
National Museum of History	Mexico City	2,676,373	Mexico	2025
Royal Tyrrell Museum of Palaeontology	Drumheller, Alberta	501,430	Canada	2022
The Huntington Library, Art Museum, and Botanical Gardens	San Marino	1,014,000	United States	2022

== Oceania ==
Name	City	Visitors per year	Country	Year reported
Art Gallery of New South Wales	Sydney	1,692,028	Australia	2023
National Gallery of Victoria	Melbourne	1,580,303	Australia	2022
Australian National Maritime Museum	Sydney	1,093,072	Australia	2023
National Gallery of Australia	Canberra	1,021,983	Australia	2022
Australian Museum	Sydney	950,000	Australia	2023
Museum of New Zealand	Wellington	863,129	New Zealand	2022
Powerhouse Museum (Ultimo)	Sydney	583,757	Australia	2023
Queensland Gallery of Modern Art	Brisbane	271,030	Australia	2020
Australian Centre for the Moving Image	Melbourne	1,316,000	Australia	2016
Museum of Contemporary Art Australia	Sydney	1,206,000	Australia	2017

== South America ==
South America
Name	City	Visitors per year	Country	Year reported
Centro Cultural Banco do Brasil	Belo Horizonte	1,474,825	Brazil	2023
Centro Cultural Banco do Brasil	Rio de Janeiro	1,323,034	Brazil	2023
Museu Nacional da Republica	Brasília	935,168	Brazil	2017
Instituto Tomie Othake	São Paulo	895,769	Brazil	2017
Pinacoteca do Estado de São Paulo	São Paulo	880,000	Brazil	2023
Museu do Ipiranga	São Paulo	655,759	Brazil	2023
São Paulo Museum of Art	São Paulo	530,235	Brazil	2023
Latin American Art Museum of Buenos Aires	Buenos Aires	515,000	Argentina	2023

== See also ==
- List of most-visited museums
- List of most-visited art museums
- List of most-visited museums in the United States
- List of most visited museums in the United Kingdom
- List of most-visited museums in France
