= List of most-visited art museums =

This is a list of the most-visited art museums. The 2025 figures are taken from the annual visitor survey of The Art Newspaper, published in March 2026. The survey lists only institutions that supplied figures meeting its criteria; the Uffizi, for example, reported 5.3 million visitors across its three sites in Florence in 2025 but was left out because it could not provide figures for individual sites.

Visitor numbers for museums in mainland China are traditionally released by the government in May each year, after the publication of The Art Newspaper list.

== Visitors in 2025 ==
Rank in 2025	Museum	Country and city	Visitors in 2025	Image
(1)	Louvre	France, Paris	9,046,000	
(2)	Vatican Museums	Vatican City	6,933,822	
(3)	National Museum of Korea	South Korea, Seoul	6,507,483	National Museum of Korea, Seoul, Korea
(4)	British Museum	United Kingdom, London	6,440,120	The British Museum, London, England
(5)	Metropolitan Museum of Art	United States, New York City	5,984,091 (Note: Main building only. Including The Met Cloisters (281,807 visitors), the total was 6,265,898.)	
(6)	State Russian Museum	Russia, Saint Petersburg	5,087,276	
(7)	National Museum of Anthropology (Mexico)	Mexico, Mexico City	5,048,893	National Museum of Anthropology, Mexico City
(8)	Shanghai Museum East	China, Shanghai	4,593,216 (Note: The Shanghai Museum's two venues, Shanghai Museum East and the museum on People's Square, received 7,027,708 visitors in total.)	
(9)	Tate Modern	United Kingdom, London	4,514,266	
(10)	National Gallery	United Kingdom, London	4,147,544	The National Gallery, London, England
(11)	State Hermitage Museum	Russia, Saint Petersburg	3,846,375	
(12)	Musée d'Orsay	France, Paris	3,785,134	The Musée d'Orsay, Paris, France
(13)	Museo del Prado	Spain, Madrid	3,513,402	
(14)	Wawel Castle	Poland, Kraków	3,477,951	
(15)	Victoria and Albert Museum	United Kingdom, London	3,332,300	Victoria and Albert Museum, London, England
(16)	Tretyakov Gallery	Russia, Moscow	3,075,976	
(17)	Somerset House	United Kingdom, London	2,895,010	Somerset House, London, England
(18)	National Gallery of Art	United States, Washington, D.C.	2,847,587	
(19)	Museum of Modern Art	United States, New York City	2,763,720	
(20)	Museo Nacional de Historia (Chapultepec Castle)	Mexico, Mexico City	2,676,373	
(21)	Centre Pompidou	France, Paris	2,665,000 (Note: The Centre Pompidou closed for refurbishment in September 2025.)	The Centre Pompidou in Paris
(22)	M+	Hong Kong	2,601,066	
(23)	Tokyo National Museum	Japan, Tokyo	2,576,118	
(24)	teamLab Planets TOKYO	Japan, Tokyo	2,516,719	
(25)	National Gallery of Victoria	Australia, Melbourne	2,495,189 (Note: Including the Ian Potter Centre: NGV Australia (566,610 visitors), the National Gallery of Victoria received 3,061,799 visitors.)	
(26)	Shanghai Museum on People's Square	China, Shanghai	2,434,492	
(27)	National Palace Museum	Taiwan, Taipei	2,426,842	
(28)	Art Gallery of New South Wales	Australia, Sydney	2,400,965	
(29)	National Museum of Scotland	United Kingdom, Edinburgh	2,318,305	
(30)	Rijksmuseum	Netherlands, Amsterdam	2,300,000	
(31)	Galleria dell'Accademia	Italy, Florence	2,279,825	
(32)	National Museum in Kraków	Poland, Kraków	2,224,936	
(33)	Museo Soumaya	Mexico, Mexico City	2,164,513	
(34)	National Museum of Modern and Contemporary Art	South Korea, Seoul	2,112,210	
(35)	National Gallery Singapore	Singapore	2,104,853	
(36)	Scottish National Gallery	United Kingdom, Edinburgh	2,004,777 (Note: Including National Galleries Scotland's other venues, Modern One (178,220 visitors), Modern Two (109,023) and the Scottish National Portrait Gallery (343,483), the total was 2,635,503.)	
(37)	Acropolis Museum	Greece, Athens	1,994,052	
(38)	Gyeongju National Museum	South Korea, Gyeongju	1,976,313	
(39)	Van Gogh Museum	Netherlands, Amsterdam	1,867,342	
(40)	Tokyo Metropolitan Art Museum	Japan, Tokyo	1,715,830	
(41)	teamLab Borderless: MORI Building Digital Art Museum	Japan, Tokyo	1,691,075	
(42)	National Museum of Western Art, Tokyo	Japan, Tokyo	1,648,112	
(43)	Royal Castle, Warsaw	Poland, Warsaw	1,635,322	
(44)	Museo Reina Sofía	Spain, Madrid	1,601,732 (Note: Main site in central Madrid only; two of the museum's other venues were closed in 2025.)	
(45)	Louis Vuitton Foundation	France, Paris	1,570,000	
(46)	Upper Belvedere	Austria, Vienna	1,556,000 (Note: Including the Lower Belvedere (375,000 visitors) and Belvedere 21 (99,000), the Belvedere received 2,030,000 visitors.)	
(47)	National Portrait Gallery	United Kingdom, London	1,523,447	
(48)	Art Institute of Chicago	United States, Chicago	1,503,406	
(49)	National Museum of Warsaw	Poland, Warsaw	1,480,055	
(50)	Petit Palais	France, Paris	1,455,790	
(51)	Louvre Abu Dhabi	United Arab Emirates, Abu Dhabi	1,423,588	
(52)	National Museum of African-American History and Culture (Smithsonian Institution)	United States, Washington, D.C.	1,400,000	
(53)	Musée du quai Branly	France, Paris	1,394,000	
(54)	Hong Kong Museum of Art	Hong Kong	1,381,415	
(55)	Museum of European and Mediterranean Civilisations	France, Marseille	1,375,533	
(56)	Doge's Palace	Italy, Venice	1,355,689	
(57)	Getty Center	United States, Los Angeles	1,323,616 (Note: Including the Getty Villa (188,952 visitors), the J. Paul Getty Museum received 1,512,568 visitors.)	
(58)	National Art Center, Tokyo	Japan, Tokyo	1,322,716	
(59)	Guggenheim Museum Bilbao	Spain, Bilbao	1,305,003	
(60)	Museo Egizio	Italy, Turin	1,273,354	
(61)	Moscow Kremlin Museums	Russia, Moscow	1,240,113	
(62)	Kelvingrove Art Gallery and Museum	United Kingdom, Glasgow	1,219,831	
(63)	São Paulo Museum of Art	Brazil, São Paulo	1,195,935	
(64)	Royal Ontario Museum	Canada, Toronto	1,159,530	The Royal Ontario Museum, Toronto, Canada
(65)	Kunsthistorisches Museum	Austria, Vienna	1,153,000 (Note: Kunsthistorisches Museum only, excluding the other museums of the KHM-Museumsverband group.)	
(66)	Tate Britain	United Kingdom, London	1,149,325	
(67)	Centro Cultural Banco do Brasil	Brazil, Rio de Janeiro	1,142,012	
(68)	Musée de l'Orangerie	France, Paris	1,129,211	
(69)	Centro Cultural Banco do Brasil	Brazil, Belo Horizonte	1,123,409	
(70)	Huntington Library, Art Museum and Botanical Gardens	United States, San Marino, California	1,094,325	
(71)	Ashmolean Museum	United Kingdom, Oxford	1,072,267	
(72)	Museum of Fine Arts, Boston	United States, Boston	1,055,981	
(73)	National Gallery of Ireland	Ireland, Dublin	1,049,638	
(74)	Albertina	Austria, Vienna	1,037,347 (Note: Main building only. Including Albertina Modern (210,818 visitors) and Albertina Klosterneuburg (42,136), the total was 1,290,301.)	
(75)	Museum of New Zealand Te Papa Tongarewa	New Zealand, Wellington	1,023,412	
(76)	Thyssen-Bornemisza Museum	Spain, Madrid	1,003,455	
(77)	Tel Aviv Museum of Art	Israel, Tel Aviv	1,000,096	
(78)	Buyeo National Museum	South Korea, Buyeo	950,862	
(79)	Hong Kong Palace Museum	Hong Kong	939,880	
(80)	Donald W. Reynolds Center	United States, Washington, D.C.	937,716 (Note: The National Portrait Gallery and the Smithsonian American Art Museum share a building and report a single figure. Including the Renwick Gallery (177,073 visitors), the Smithsonian American Art Museum received 1,114,789 visitors.)	
(81)	Museu Nacional d'Art de Catalunya	Spain, Barcelona	922,249	
(82)	Fabergé Museum	Russia, Saint Petersburg	917,935	
(83)	GES-2 (Moscow)	Russia, Moscow	909,498	
(84)	Serralves Museum of Contemporary Art	Portugal, Porto	902,024	
(85)	UCCA Center for Contemporary Art	China, Beijing	901,435	
(86)	Whitney Museum	United States, New York City	885,360	
(87)	Frederik Meijer Gardens & Sculpture Park	United States, Grand Rapids Charter Township, Michigan	881,625	
(88)	National Museum of Art, Architecture and Design	Norway, Oslo	878,000	
(89)	Gongju National Museum	South Korea, Gongju	868,555	
(90)	Capitoline Museums	Italy, Rome	860,018	
(91)	CaixaForum Madrid	Spain, Madrid	852,345	
(92)	de Young Museum	United States, San Francisco	840,573 (Note: Including the Legion of Honor (406,265 visitors), the Fine Arts Museums of San Francisco received 1,246,838 visitors.)	
(93)	Museum of Fine Arts, Houston	United States, Houston	835,925	
(94)	Pinacoteca do Estado de São Paulo	Brazil, São Paulo	820,000	
(95)	Museum of Contemporary Art Australia	Australia, Sydney	819,504	
(96)	Yokohama Museum of Art	Japan, Yokohama	815,931	
(97)	Museo Nacional de Bellas Artes	Argentina, Buenos Aires	808,258	
(98)	Crystal Bridges Museum of American Art	United States, Bentonville	802,382	
(99)	Los Angeles County Museum of Art	United States, Los Angeles	801,587	
(100)	Cleveland Museum of Art	United States, Cleveland	800,822	

The 100 most popular art museums in the world in 2022, divided by countries and continents.

== See also ==
- List of most-visited museums
- List of most visited museums in the United Kingdom
- List of most-visited museums in the United States
- List of most-visited museums in France
- List of most visited palaces and monuments
- List of most-visited museums by region
- List of art museums
- List of largest art museums
- List of national galleries
- List of single-artist museums
