= List of most-visited palaces and monuments =

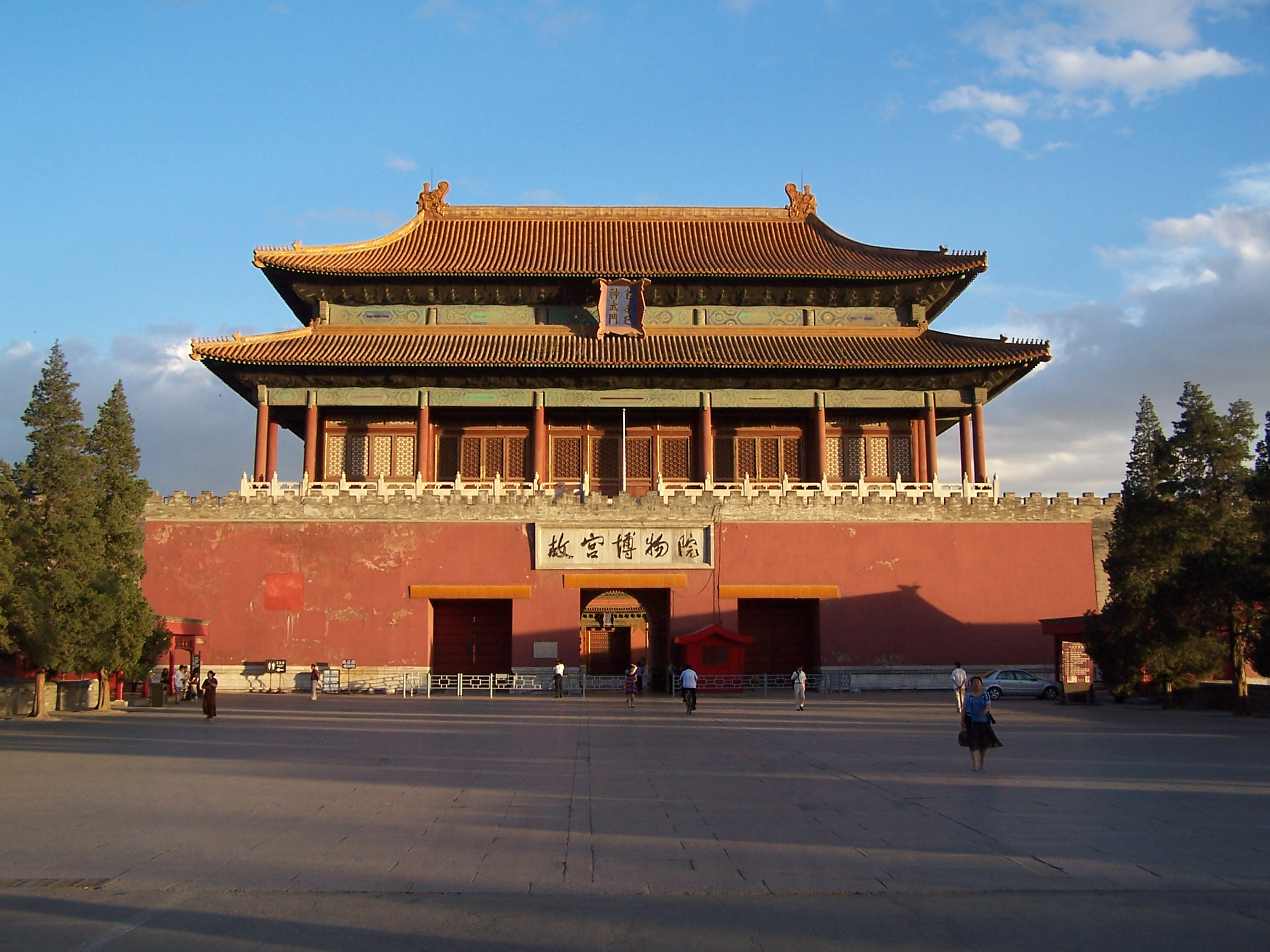
Forbidden City, Beijing, China. The most visited monument in the world.

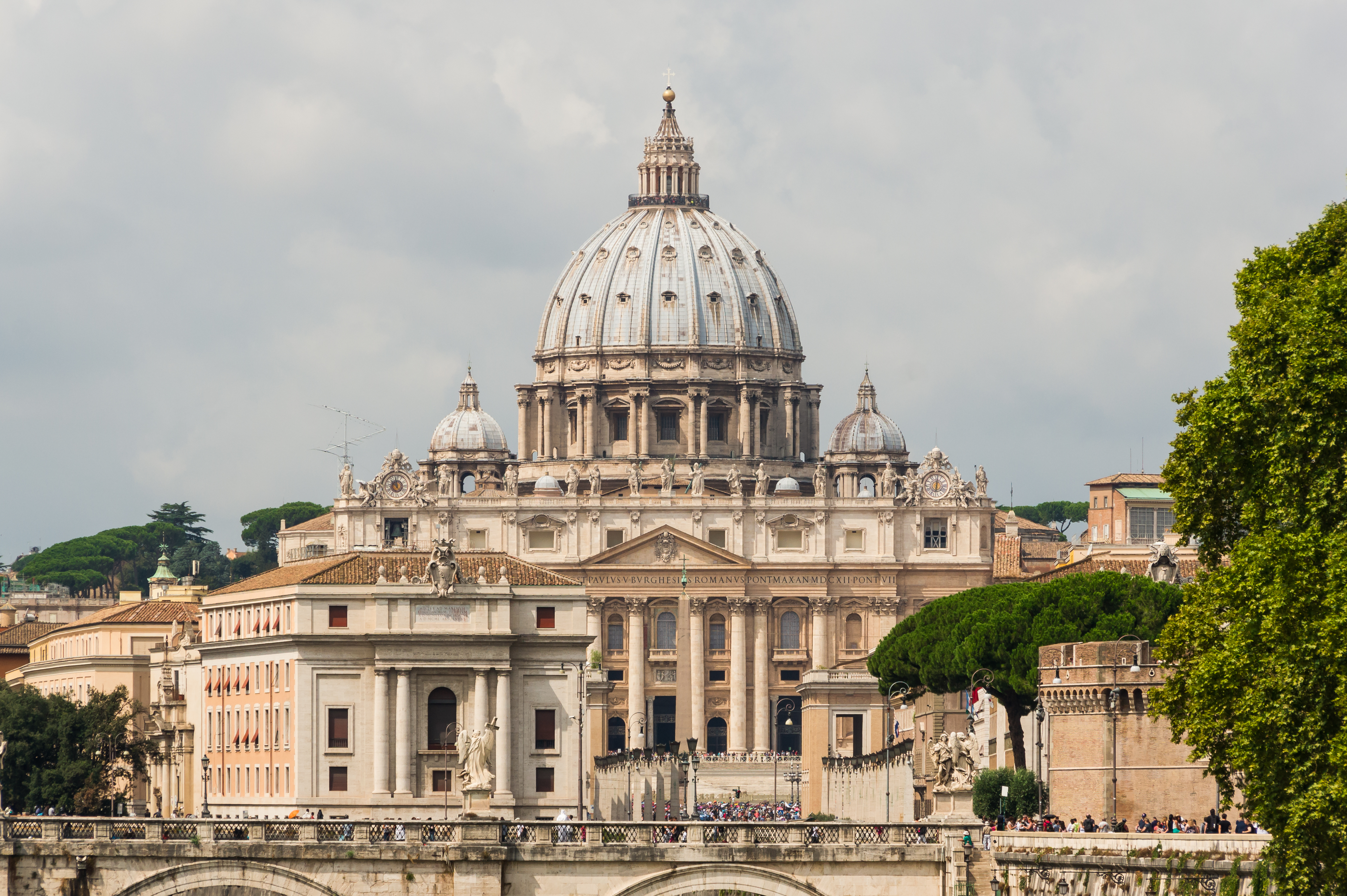
St. Peter's Basilica, Rome, Vatican City.

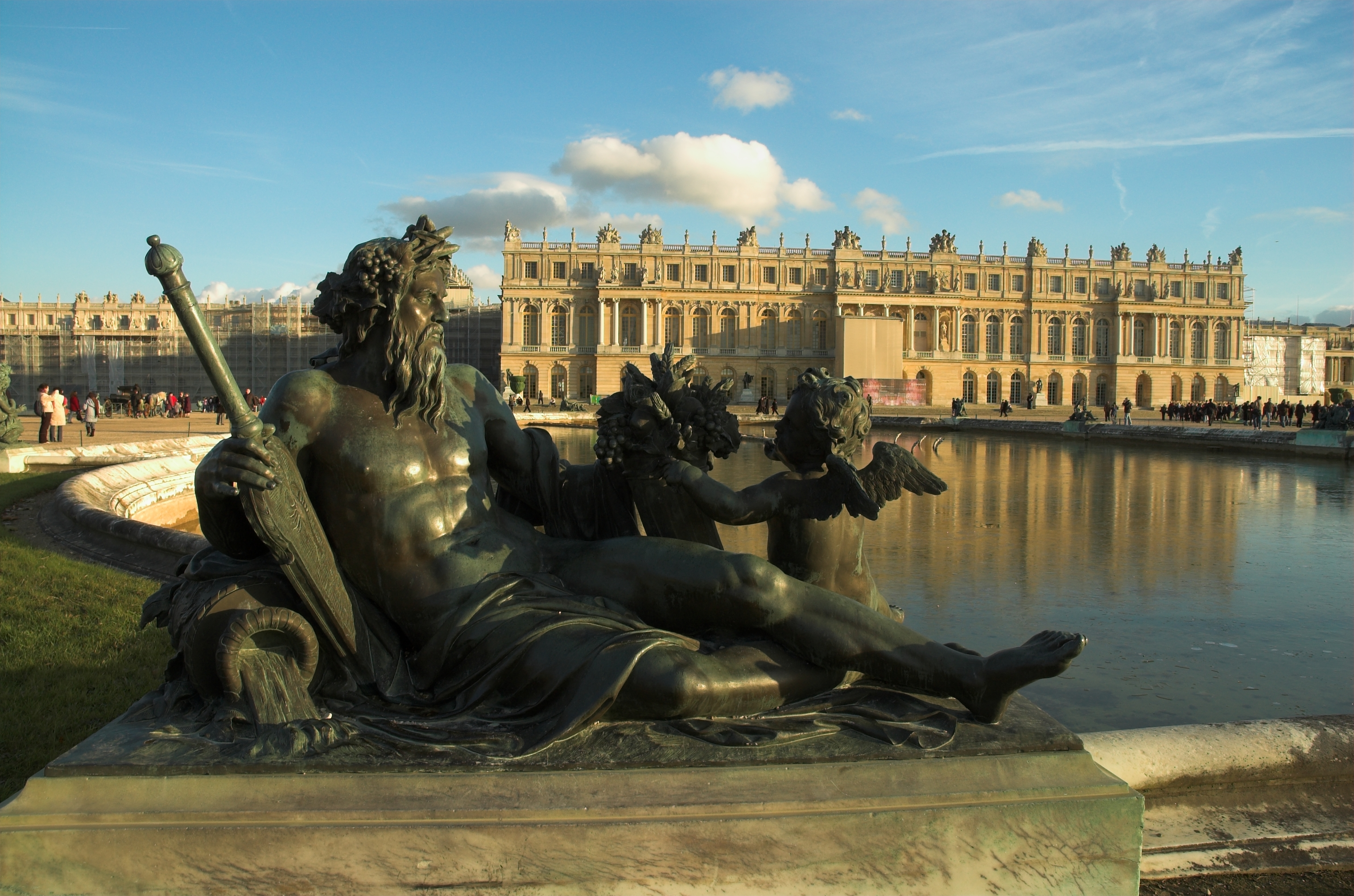
Palace of Versailles, Versailles, France.

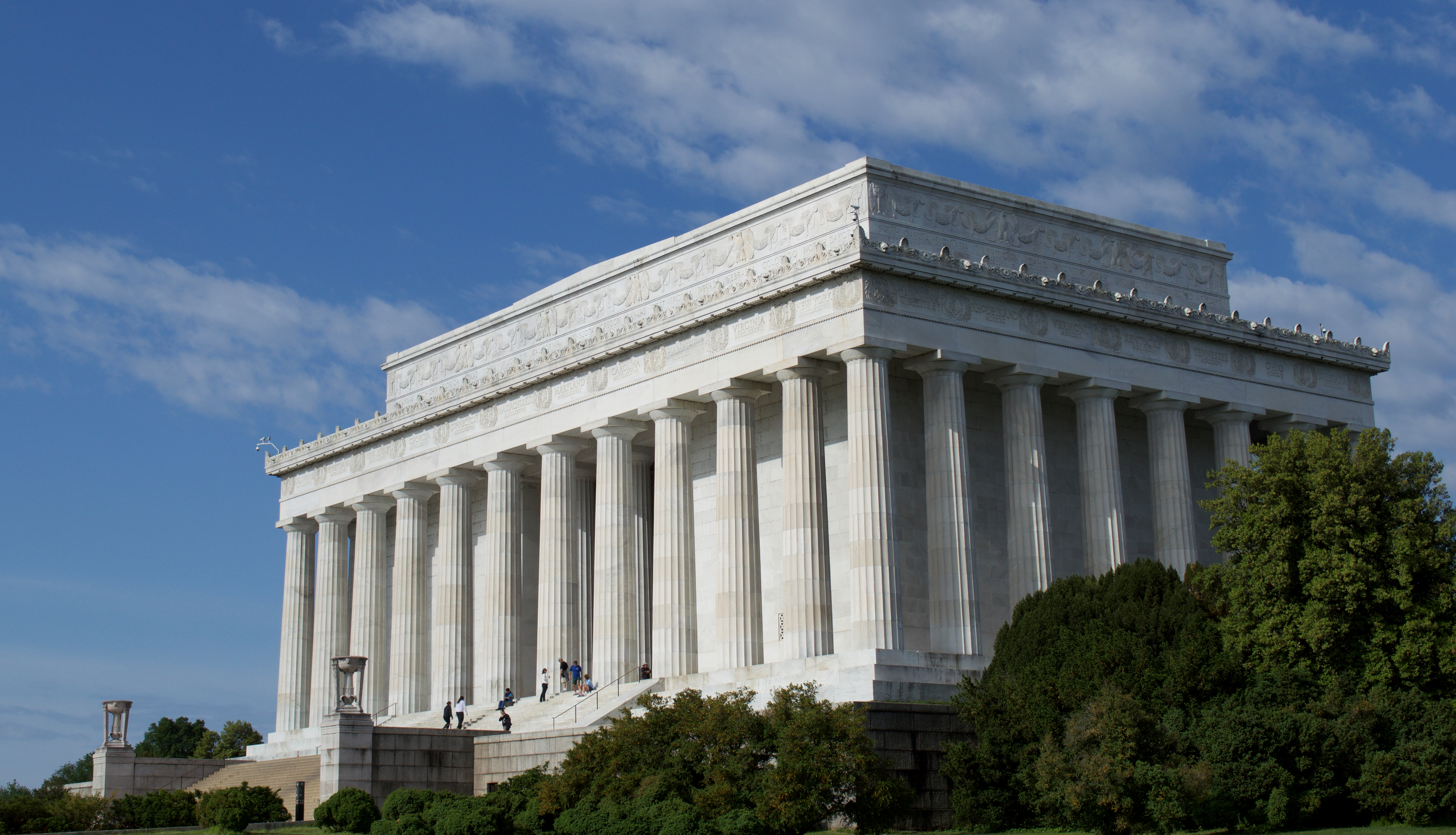
Lincoln Memorial, Washington D.C., U.S.

Colosseum, Rome, Italy.

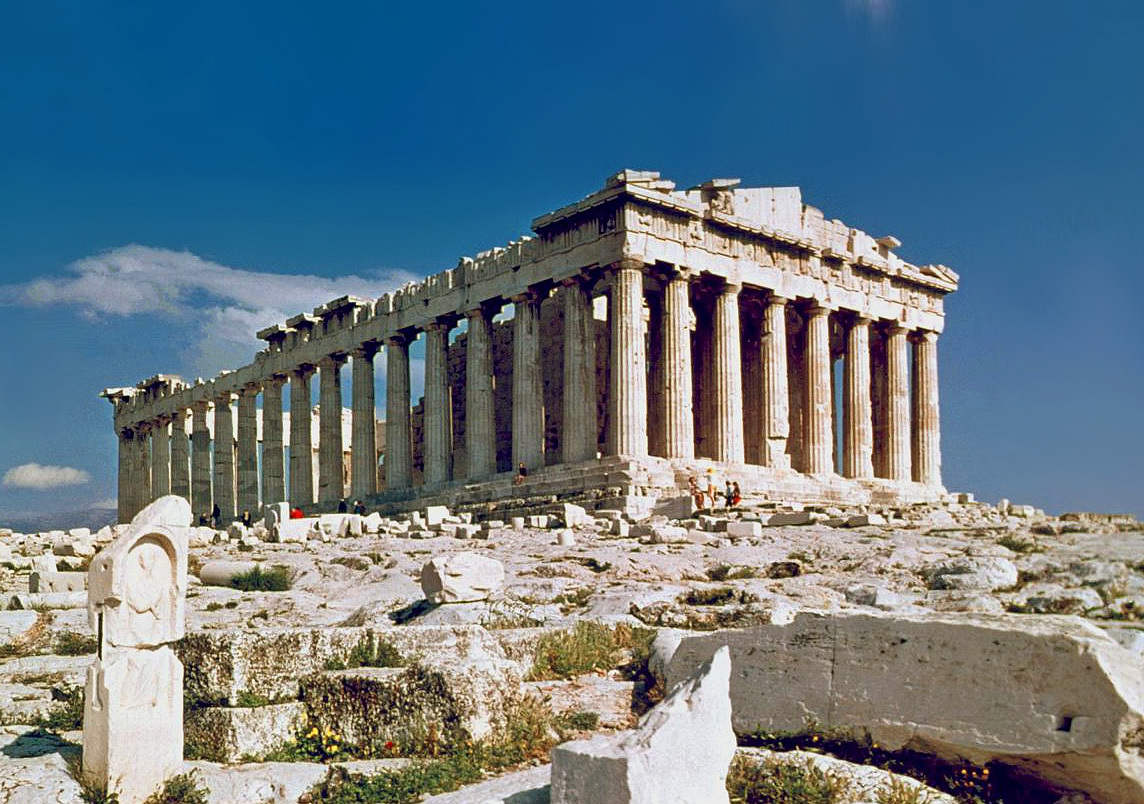
Parthenon, Athens, Greece

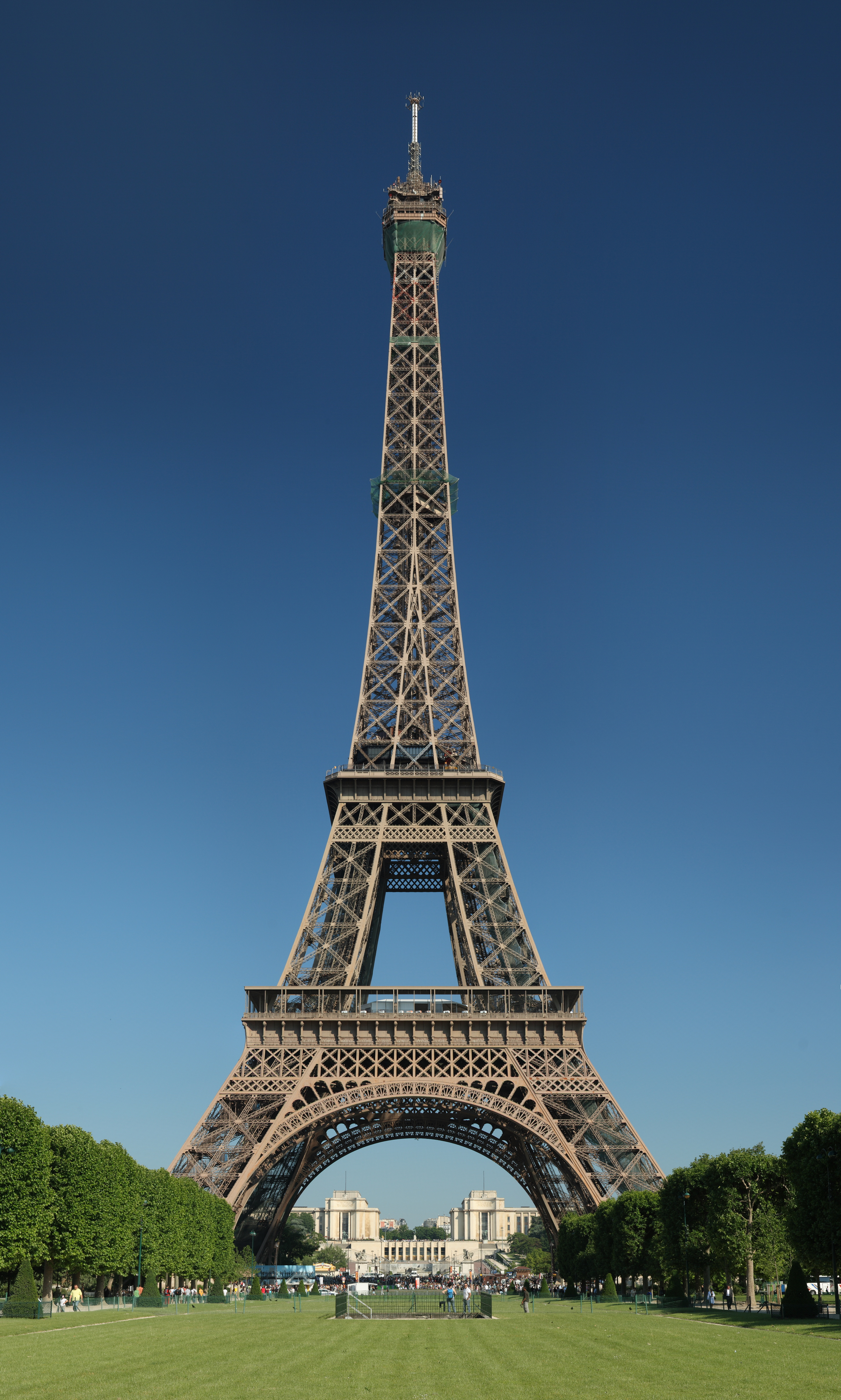
Eiffel Tower, Paris, France

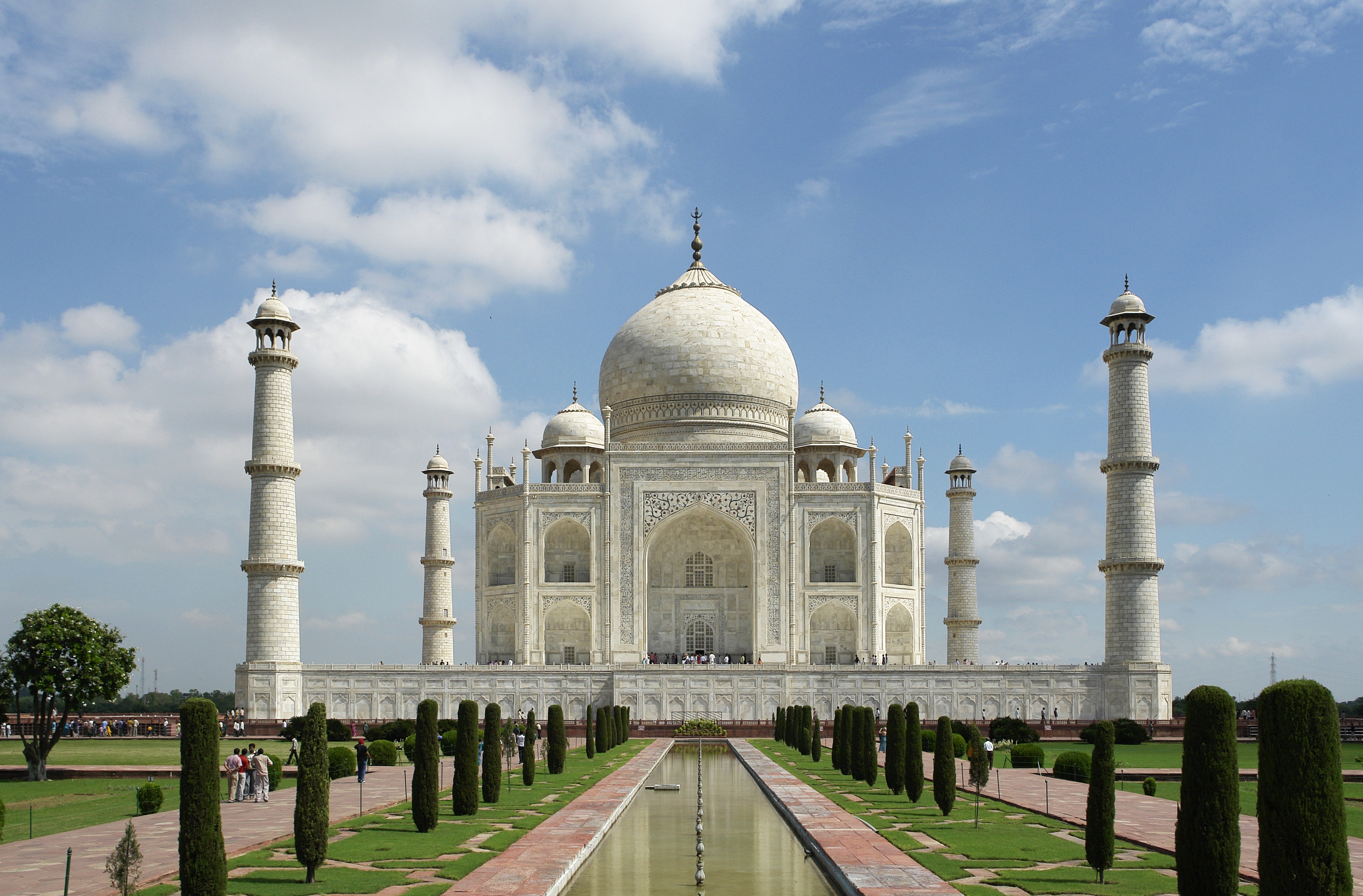
Taj Mahal, Agra, India

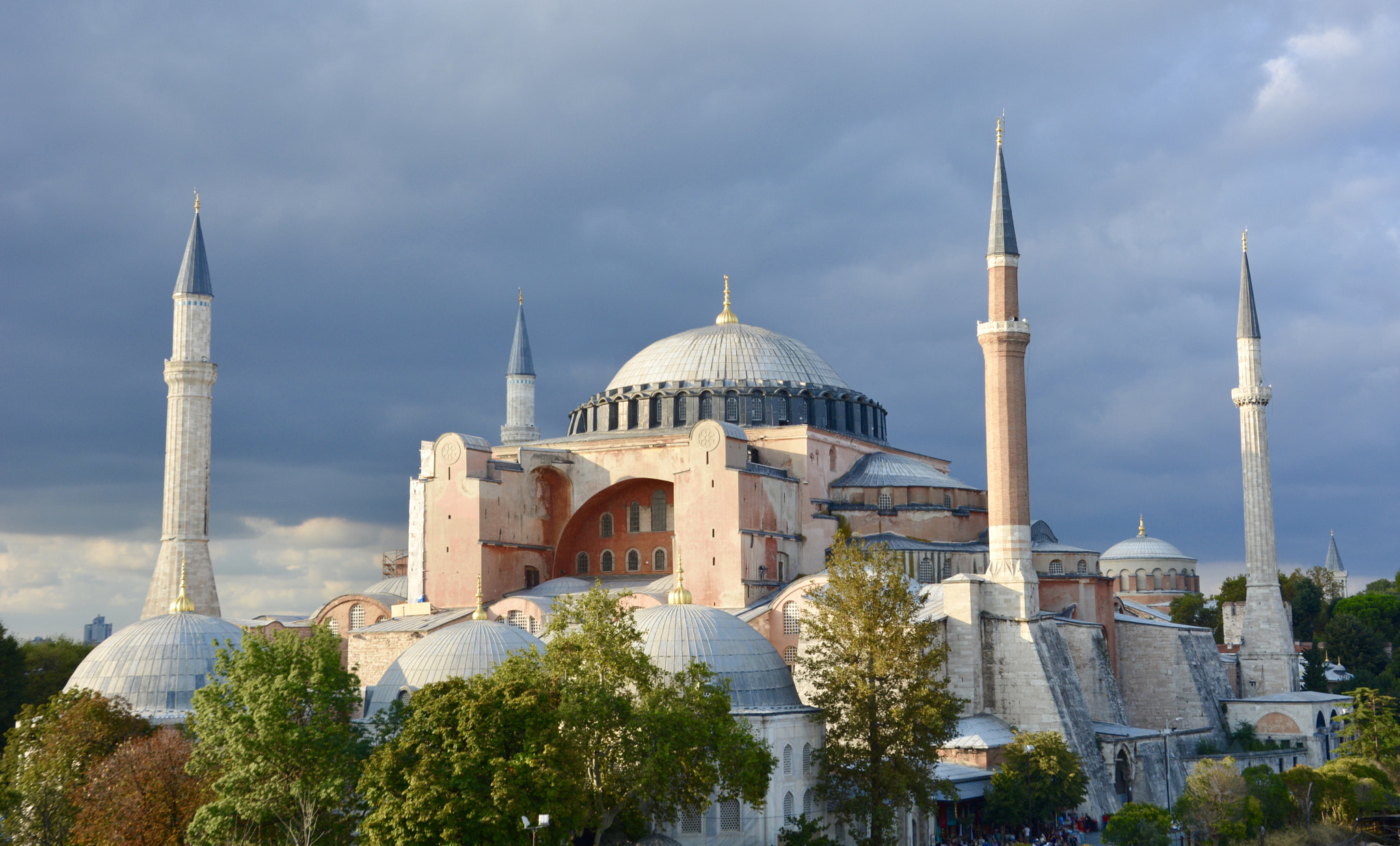
Hagia Sophia, Istanbul, Turkey

This is a list of the most visited national monuments, including palaces, historical monuments and historic sites. Sources used to compile the list include an annual survey of the Association of Leading Visitor Attractions (ALVA) in the United Kingdom; the U.S. National Park Service list of National Monuments, Patrimonio Nacional of Spain, and the Italian, French, and Russian Ministries of Culture.

== List ==
National monuments by visitors per year
Name	Country flag, city	Visitors per year	Year reported
The Forbidden City	(China) Beijing	17,000,000+	2018
St. Peter's Basilica-Apostolic Palace	Vatican City	11,000,000	2018
Palace of Versailles	(France) Versailles	8,100,000	2018
Lincoln Memorial	(United States) Washington, D.C.	7,804,683	2018
Forum Romanum-Colosseum-Palatine Hill Circuit	(Italy) Rome	7,650,519	2018
Acropolis of Athens-Parthenon	(Greece) Athens	7,200,000	2016
Eiffel Tower	(France) Paris	7,000,000	2017
Taj Mahal	(India) Agra	6,532,366	2019
Hagia Sophia	(Turkey) Istanbul	6,250,000	2024
Cologne Cathedral	(Germany) Cologne	6,000,000	2018
Peterhof Palace	(Russia) Saint Petersburg	5,245,900	2016
Statue of Unity	(India) Kevadiya	5,000,000+	2023
Łazienki Palace	(Poland) Warsaw	4,966,858	2019
Vietnam Veterans Memorial	(United States) Washington, D.C.	4,719,148	2018
World War II Memorial	(United States) Washington, D.C.	4,652,865	2018
Independence National Historical Park	(United States) Philadelphia	4,576,436	2018
Sagrada Família	(Spain) Barcelona	4,500,000	2018
Statue of Liberty National Monument	(United States) New York City	4,335,431	2018
Teotihuacán	(Mexico) Teotihuacán	4,070,000	2018
Mysore Palace	(India) Mysore	3,861,162	2019
Tsarskoe Selo State Museum-Reserve	(Russia) Saint Petersburg	3,694,000	2016
Pompeii	(Italy) Pompei, Naples	3,646,585	2018
Topkapı Palace	(Turkey) Istanbul	3,474,760	2023
Wilanów Palace	(Poland) Warsaw	3,115,797	2019
Royal Castle	(Poland) Warsaw	2,036,642	2024
Schönbrunn Palace	(Austria) Vienna	3,050,000	2017
Kazan Kremlin	(Russia) Kazan	2,893,300	2016
Tower of London	(United Kingdom) London	2,858,336	2018
Alhambra	(Spain) Granada	2,760,000	2018
Chichén Itzá	(Mexico) Yucatán	2,740,000	2018
Chapultepec Castle	Mexico City	2,661,615	2018
Ciudad de las Artes y las Ciencias	(Spain) Valencia	2,637,567	2018
Moscow Kremlin	(Russia) Moscow	2,478,622	2016
Battle of Stalingrad State Museum-Reserve	(Russia) Volgograd	2,359,300	2016
Tulum	(Mexico) Quintana Roo	2,190,000	2018
Auschwitz-Birkenau Memorial and Museum	(Poland) Oświęcim	2,053,000	2016
Edinburgh Castle	(United Kingdom) Edinburgh	2,111,578	2018
Mosque–Cathedral of Córdoba	(Spain) Córdoba	1,953,133	2018
Royal Alcázar of Seville	(Spain) Seville	1,875,744	2018
Wawel Castle	(Poland) Kraków	1,587,999	2019
Arc de Triomphe	(France) Paris	1,583,260	2017
Royal Palace of Madrid	(Spain) Madrid	1,552,481	2018
Dolmabahçe Palace	(Turkey) Istanbul	1,500,000	2022
Neuschwanstein Castle	(Germany) Schwangau	1,500,000	2017
Machu Picchu	(Peru) Cusco	1,411,276	2017
Castillo San Felipe del Morro (San Juan National Historic Site)	(Puerto Rico) San Juan	1,400,000	2016

== See also ==
- List of most visited museums
- List of most visited art museums
- List of most visited museums by region

== Notes ==
^ii Statistics refer to the fiscal year ending 30 June 2017.
