= List of most-visited museums in France =

This is a list of the most-visited museums in France in 2024 as reported by the Club-Innovation-Culture.fr and Beauxarts.com with the figures published by the French Ministry of Culture.

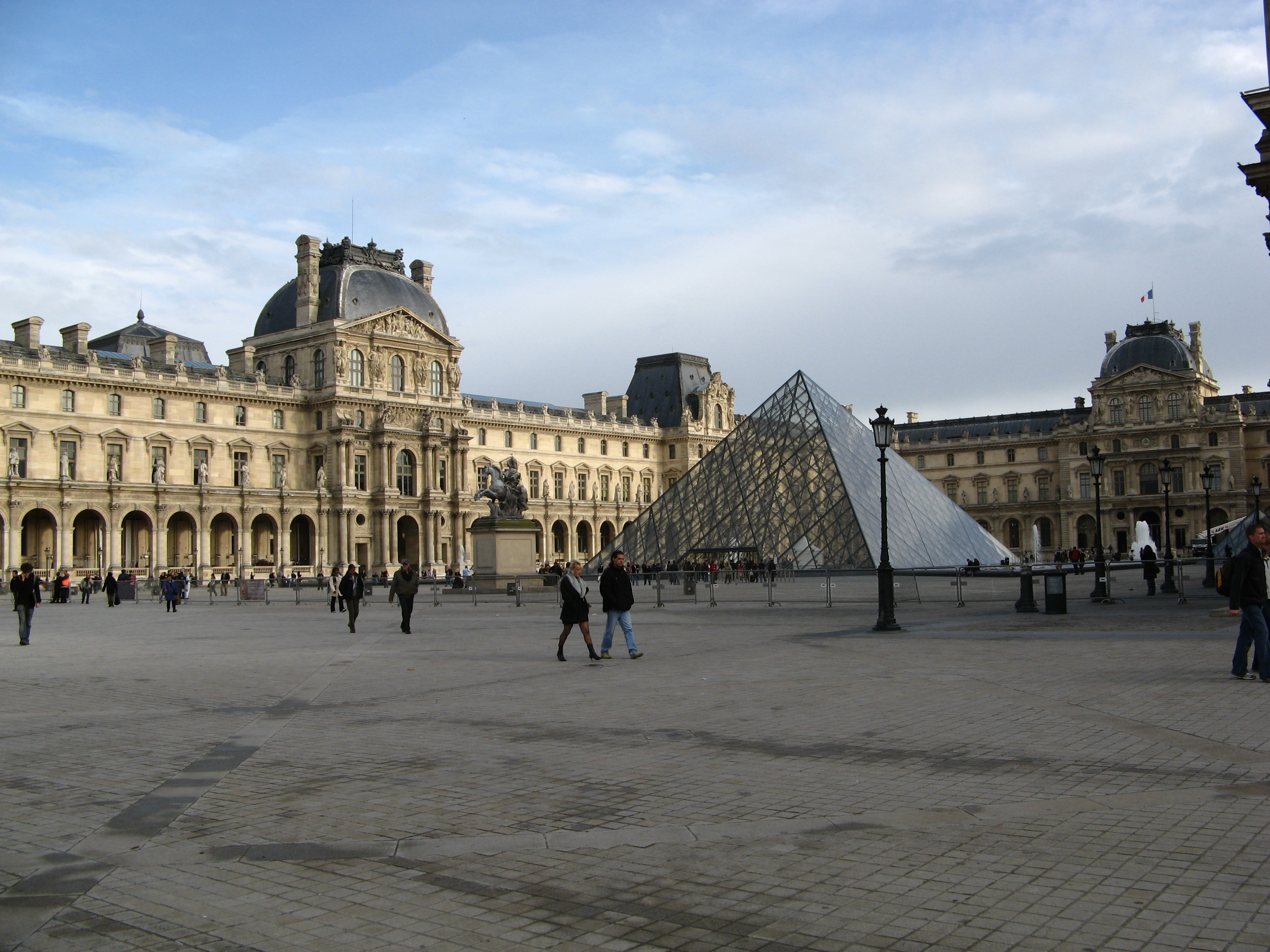
Musée du Louvre, Paris, France

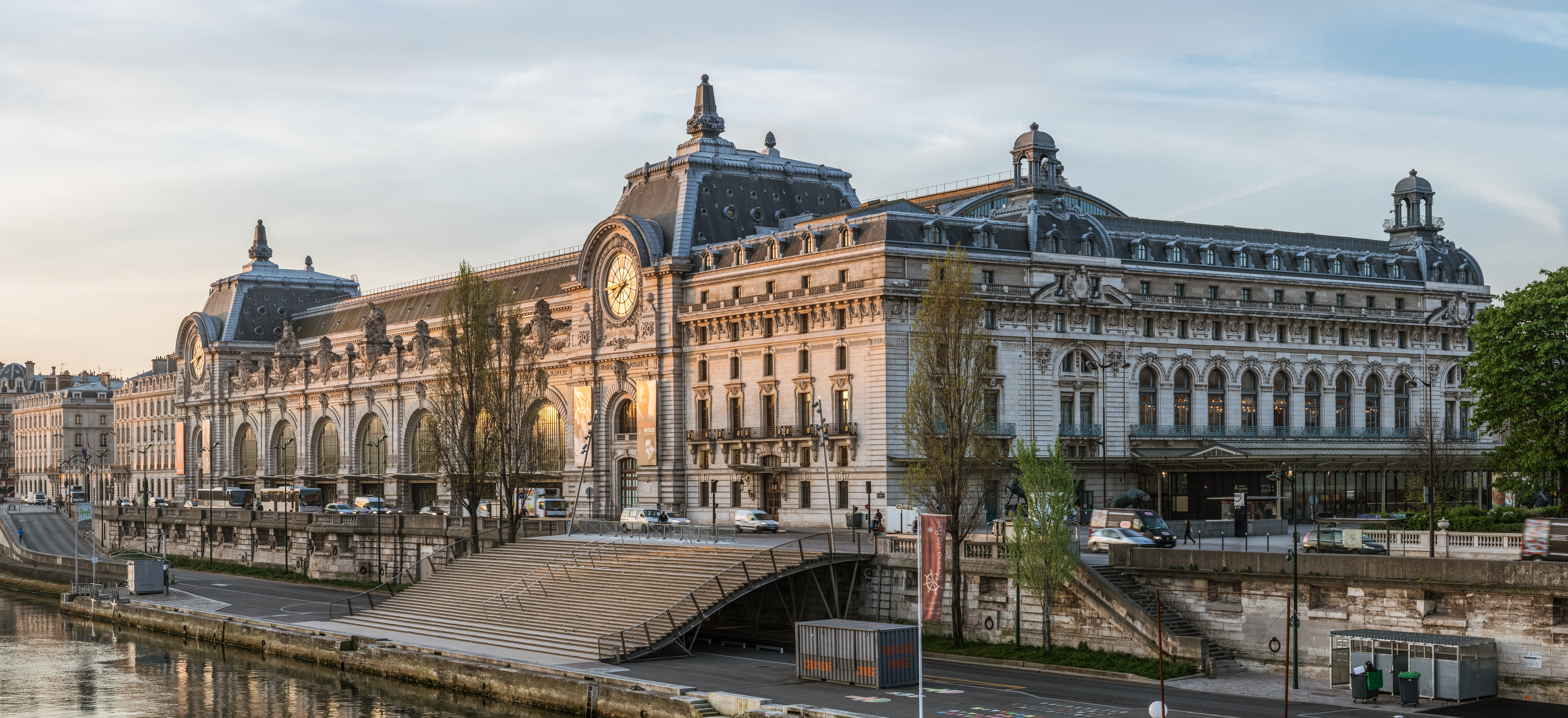
Musée d'Orsay

Rank	Museum	Location	Visitors	Year
(1)	Louvre	Paris	8.7 million	2024
(2)	Musée d'Orsay	Paris	3,751,141	2024
(3)	Musée National d'Art Moderne (Centre Pompidou)	Paris	3,204,369	2024
(4)	Cité des Sciences et de l'Industrie	Paris	1,744,0000	2024
(5)	Musée National d'Art Moderne (Centre Pompidou)	Paris	3,204,369	2024
(6)	Musée du Quai Branly – Jacques Chirac	Paris	1,270,000	2024
(7)	Museum of European and Mediterranean Civilisations (MUCEM)	Marseille	1,300,000 million	2024
(9)	Musée de l'Armée (Museum of the French Army)	Paris	1,306,000	2024
(10)	Petit Palais (Fine Arts Museum of the City of Paris)	Paris	1,459,371,	2024

== See also ==
- List of most-visited museums
- List of most-visited art museums
