= Western Association for Art Conservation =

- Western Association for Art Conservation (WAAC)
- Founded: 1975 Email: secretary@waac-us.org
- Affiliations: Professional association
- Website: cool.conservation-us.org/waac/

The Western Association for Art Conservation (WAAC) is a nonprofit regional membership organization for conservation professionals based in the Western United States, although membership is open to all irrespective of geographical location.

== Aims ==
WAAC serves its members, who have a professional responsibility for the preservation of cultural heritage, and disseminates information through its publications and annual meeting/conference. WAAC advances knowledge, practice and standards for the conservation profession.

WAAC's bylaws state that the specific purposes of WAAC are:

- To provide an organization that advances the knowledge of conservation and improves the methods of conservation needed to protect, preserve, and maintain the condition and integrity of objects, structures, or sites that, because of their history, significance, rarity, or quality of work, have a commonly accepted value and importance for the public interest.
- To expand knowledge of all subjects related to the conservation of artistic, historic, and other cultural property.
- To encourage education, study, and research in the conservation of artistic, historic, and other cultural property.
- To promote proficiency and skill in the practice of the conservation of artistic, historic, and other cultural property.
- To maintain and promote professional relationships, standards of practice, and ethics for conservators, and to oppose any influences that would tend to lower such standards and ethics.
- To organize and otherwise participate in exhibitions dealing with the conservation of artistic, historic, and other cultural property.
- To publish, sell, circulate, and distribute books, magazines, publications, literature, films, magnetic tapes, and digital media dealing with the conservation of artistic, historic, and other cultural property.
- To solicit funds and to receive donations and legacies. To execute the expenditure of grant monies.
- To take all action necessary or desirable in order to accomplish any of the purposes of WAAC, provided that such action is in conformity with the provisions of the California Law, Revenue and Taxation Code, Section 23701d, or the Federal Internal Revenue Code, Section 501(c)(3).

== History ==
WAAC was founded in 1975 to bring together conservators practicing in the western United States to exchange ideas, information and news.

One of the prime forces behind the creation of the Western Association for Art Conservation, or Western Association of Art Conservators as it was initially called, was Benjamin Bishop Johnson, who served as the first President of the organization; and at the time was Chief Conservator at LACMA, as well as a lecturer at UCLA.

== Organisation and Governance ==
=== Current WAAC Board of Directors (2019 - 2020) ===
The current WAAC Board.

- President, Patricia O’Reagan, Fine Arts Museums of San Francisco
- Vice-President, Geneva Griswold, Seattle Art Museum
- Treasurer & Membership Secretary, Chris Stavroudis
- Secretary, Collean O’Shea, Fine Arts Museums of San Francisco
- Member-at-Large, Sophie Hunter, Academy Museum of Motion Pictures
- Member-at-Large, Kent Severson, Doris Duke’s Shangri-La
- Member-at-Large, Anne Getts, Fine Arts Museums of San Francisco
- Member-at-Large, Jessica Johnson, University of Kansas Libraries & Spencer Museum of Art
- Newsletter Editor, Carolyn Tallent
- Web Editor, Justin Johnson, University of Washington
- Social Media Liaison, Christina O’Connell, The Huntington Libraries, Art Collections, & Botanical Gardens
- Fulfillments, Donna Williams, Williams Art Conservation, Inc.
- Mid-Year Meeting Coordinator, Susanne Friend
- Newsletter Copy Editor, Wendy Partridge

== Publications ==
=== Membership Directory ===
A membership directory is published annually and sent to members. The membership directory is alternatively available to members in electronic format; as a pdf. WAAC's Membership Directory is distributed in March of each year.

=== Newsletter ===
The WAAC Newsletter (ISSN 1052-0066) has been published since 1979, and is published three times per year, in January, May and September. Each issue has been 28-32 pages long. Each issue contains several feature articles, many of which are widely cited, and the newsletter is a widely referenced resource for heritage professionals.

Regular columns include:

- Letter from the President
- Regional News
- Technical Exchange
- Health & Safety
- Articles You May Have Missed
- Publications and Audiovisual
- Conference Reviews
- Positions Available

A 10-Year Cumulative Index of the WAAC Newsletter (1979-1988, Volumes 1-10) has also been produced. Back issues are also available online.

==== Hurricane Katrina ====
In response to Hurricane Katrina WAAC published a special issue of the WAAC Newsletter, September 2005 (vol 27, no 3), devoted to issue of salvage and emergency response. The issue included information on health and safety for salvage operations, a reprint with a new introduction of Betty Walsh's "Salvage Operations for Water Damaged Archival Collections" and the "Salvage at a Glance" chart (printed on waterproof synthetic paper), as well as a collection of new information and reprinted materials from a number of sources.

=== A Guide to Handling Anthropological Museum Collections ===
The WAAC publication A Guide to Handling Anthropological Museum Collections is available in both English and Spanish (Guía para el manejo de colecciones antropológicas de museos).

The guide has also been translated into Arabic. Although not directly available from WAAC, it is reportedly widely distributed in the Arab speaking world.

This is a humorous guide to the "do's and don'ts" of collections handling, and was written by Nancy Odegaard and illustrated by Grace Katterman. It is soft bound, and runs to 41 pages.

=== Out of Print Publications ===
- Loss Compensation Symposium Postprints.

A compilation of the talks comprising the Loss Compensation panel from the 1993 meeting at the Marconi Conference Center, enhanced by a detailed introduction into the history of loss compensation theory written by Patricia Leavengood.

CONTENTS

- Loss Compensation Theory and Practice: A Brief History Patricia Leavengood p. 1
- "Necessity Introduced These Arts" Loss Compensation in the History of Conservation Elizabeth Darrow p. 7
- Compensations for Deteriorations Resulting in Losses: A Structuralist Looks at Old and New Practices for the
- Conservation of Ethnographic, Archaeological, and Contemporary Objects Dale Paul Kronkright p. 13
- Review of Loss Compensation Techniques Used in Textile Conservation Sharon K. Shore p. 19
- Loss Compensation in Paper Debra Evans p. 25
- Dilemmas of Compensation in Contemporary Art Tatyana M. Thompson p. 29
- Aesthetic and Cultural Considerations for the Conservation of Hispanic New Mexican Religious Art Keith Bakker p. 33
- East and West: Approaches to Loss Compensation Linda Scheifler Marks p. 41
- The Japanese Use of Gold Lacquer in Ceramic Restoration Genevieve A. Baird p. 45

== Annual meeting ==
WAAC holds an annual meeting, also referred to as a conference. Information about past meetings can be found on the WAAC website.

In 2009 rain water entered the Alaska State Archives building, when a storm ripped the roof from the building, WAAC members who "serendipitously happen to be in Juneau for the Western Association for Art Conservation conference" assist with the rescue efforts. The conference went ahead, and included a public lecture by Yosi Pozeilov about pinhole cameras.
