= Shanghai Museum East =

East Branch of the Shanghai Museum

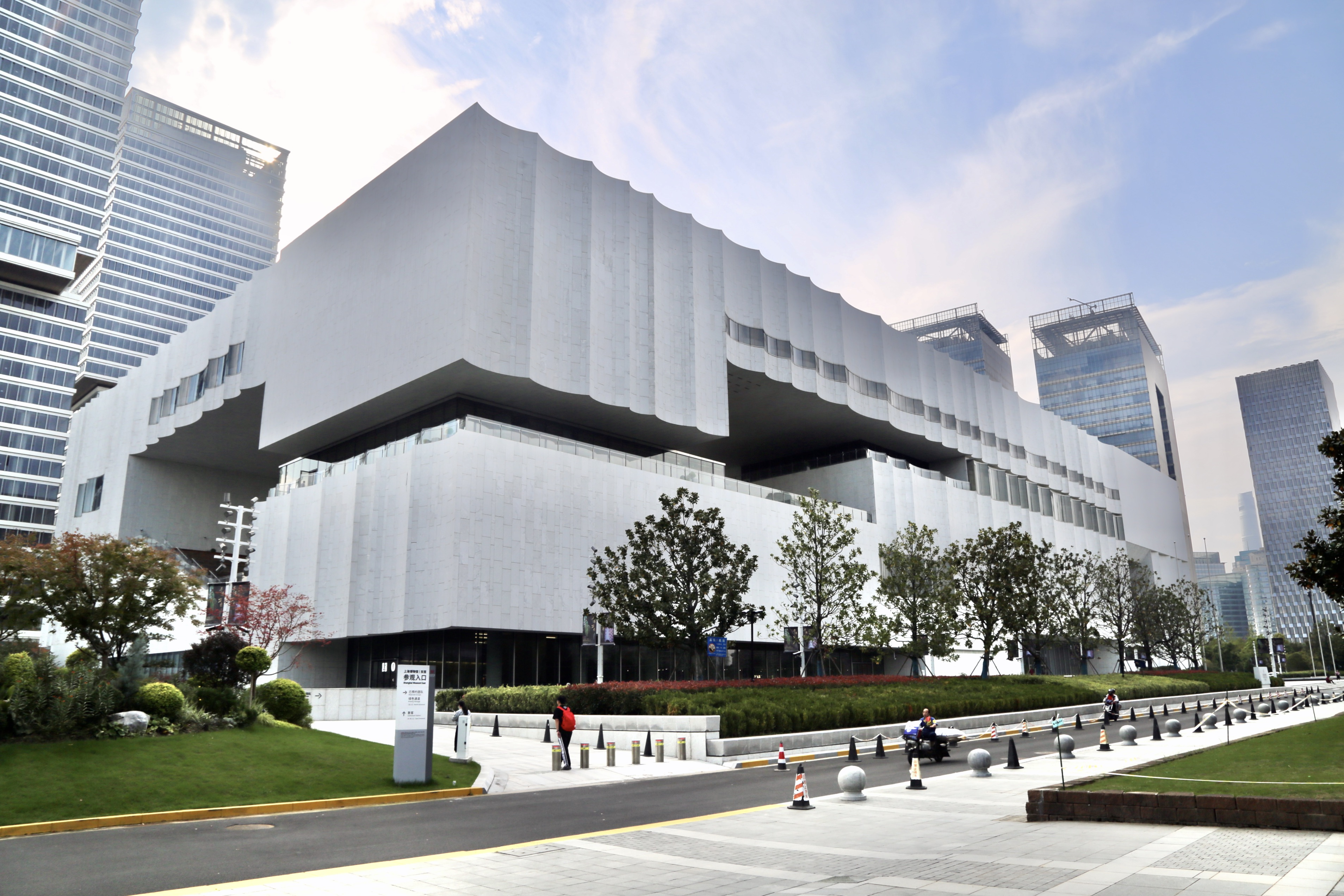
Shanghai Museum East

The East Branch of the Shanghai Museum (Chinese: 上海博物馆东馆), known as the Shanghai Museum East (Chinese: 上海博物馆东馆), is a museum in the Pudong New Area of Shanghai, China.

Construction of the museum began in September 2017. The Bronze Exhibition Hall opened on 2 February 2024, and the museum fully opened on 3 December of that year. The museum's exhibition area occupies 4,000 m^{2} (43,000 sq ft).
