= List of the most-visited attractions in the United Kingdom =

This article lists the most-visited attractions in the United Kingdom, including art galleries, gardens, zoos, theatres, libraries and museums. (It only includes attractions which are members of the Association of Leading Visitor Attractions.)

== Ranking ==
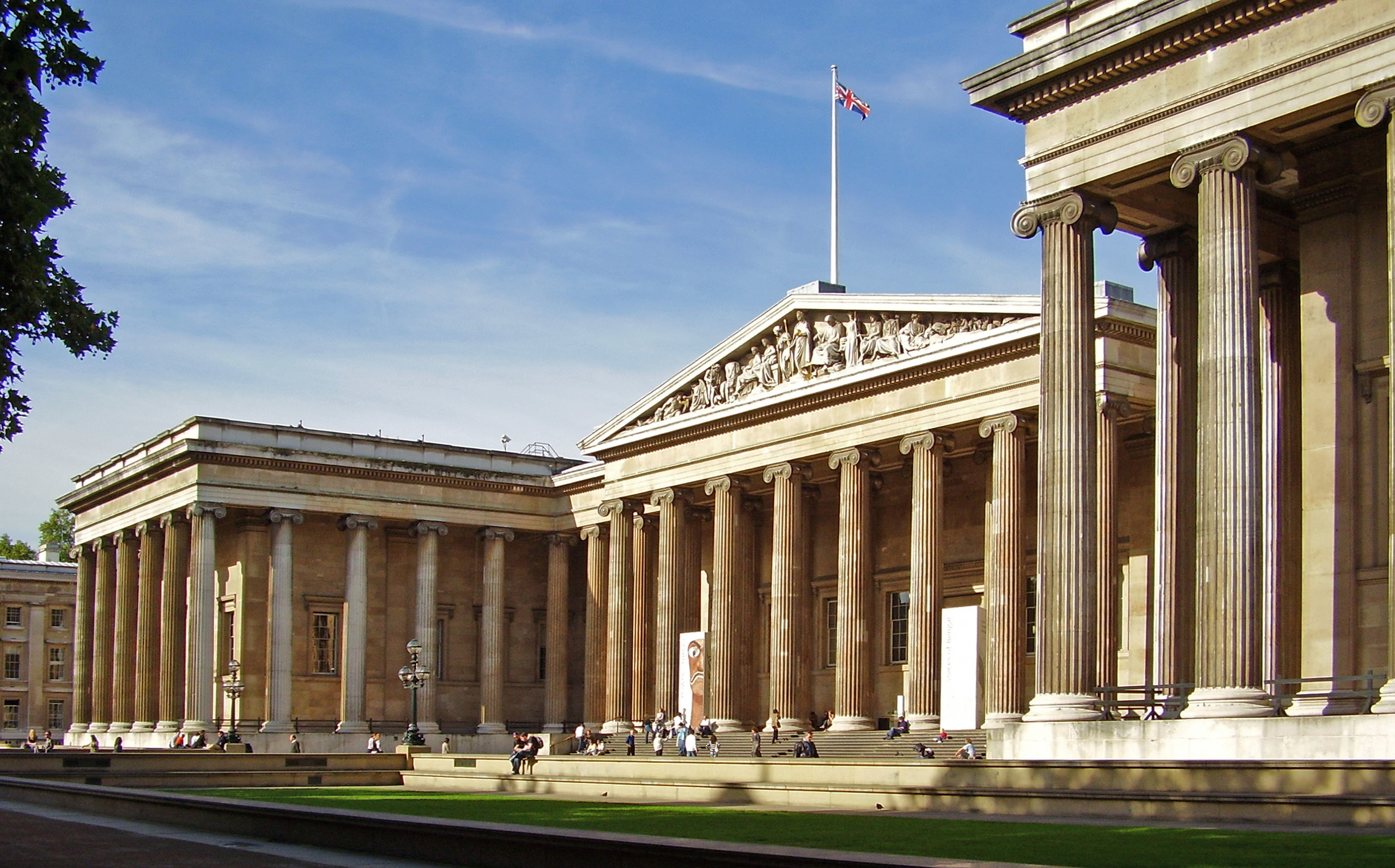
British Museum, London

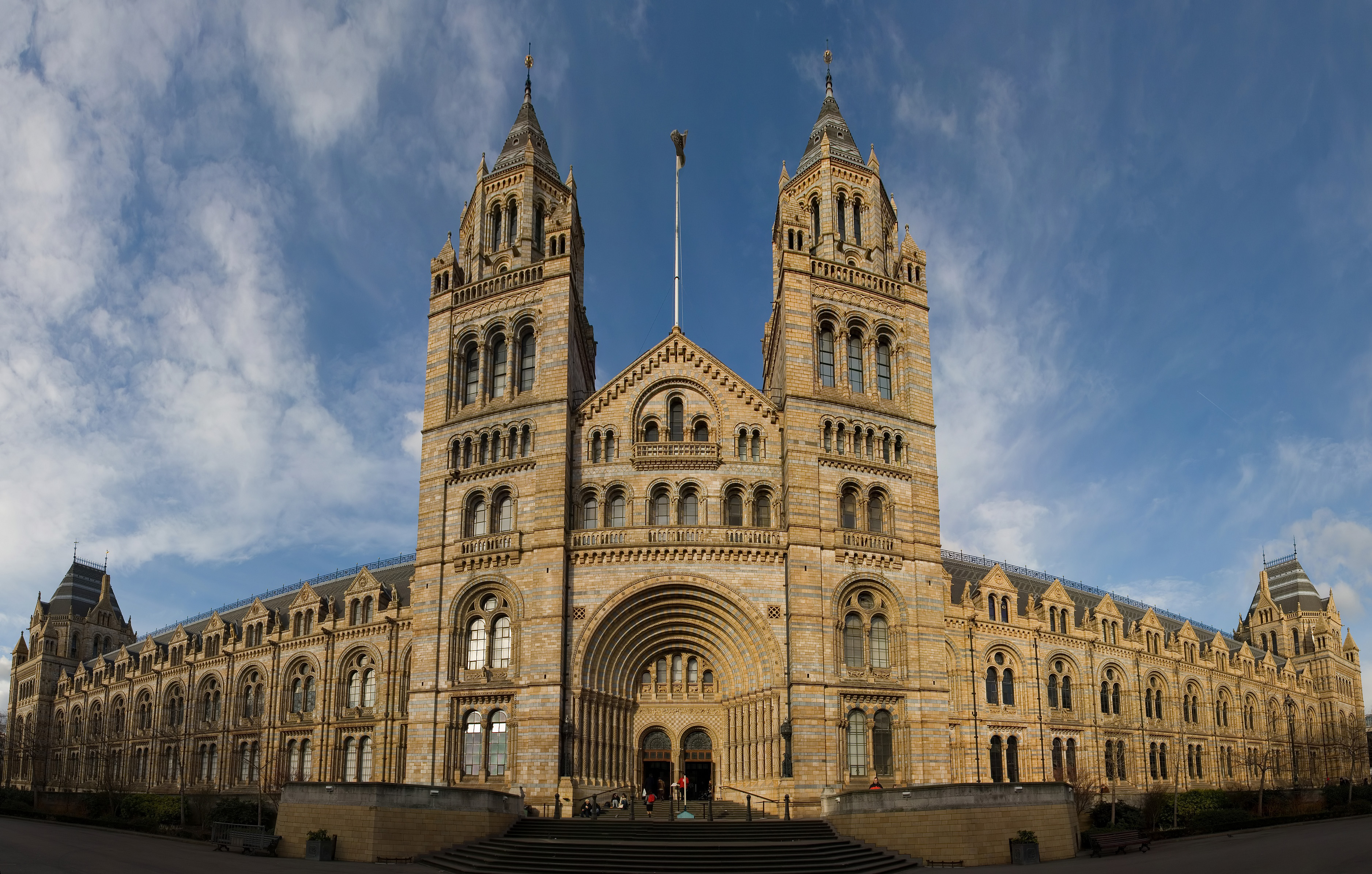
Natural History Museum, London

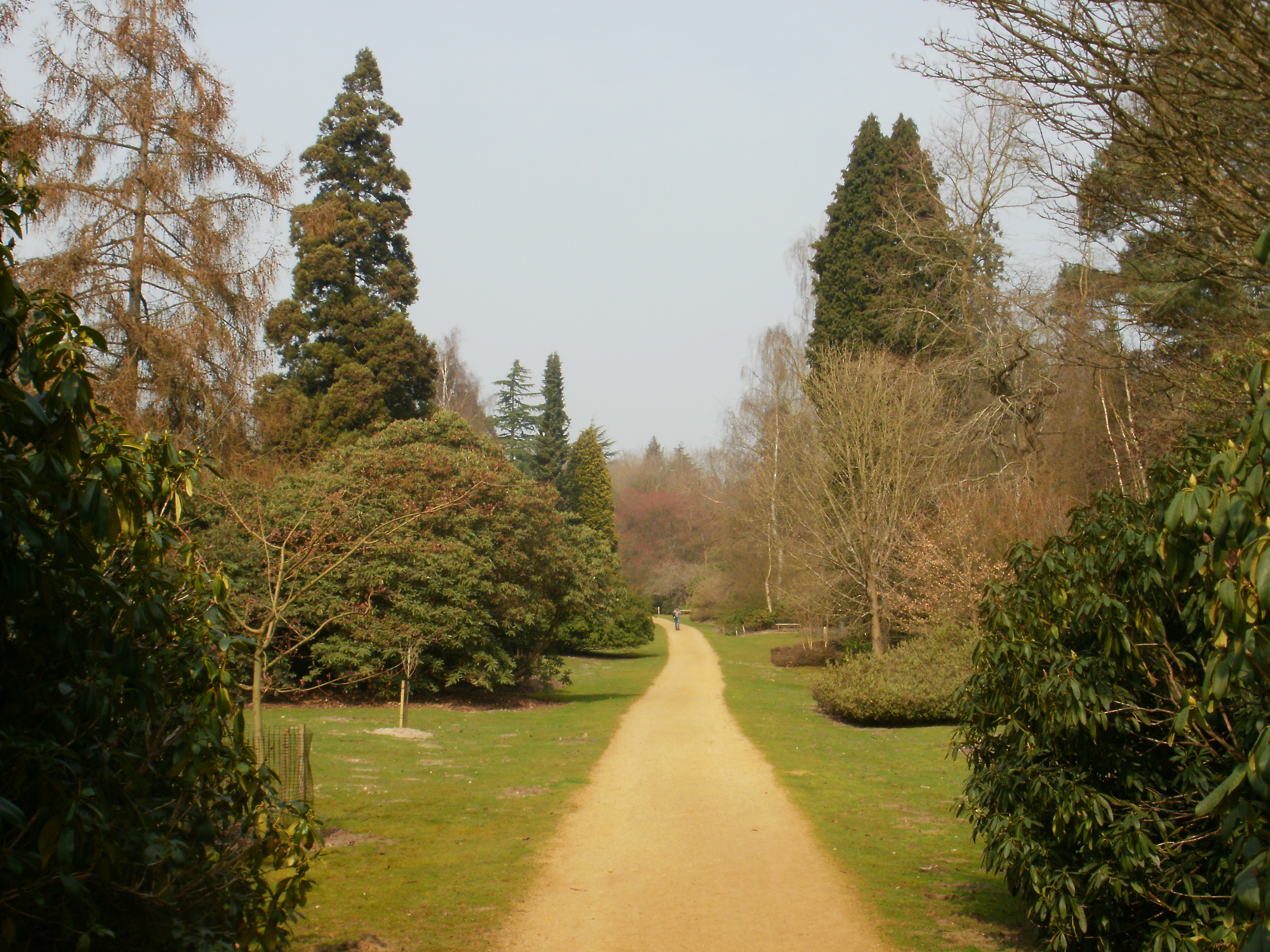
The Valley Gardens at Windsor Great Park

Attraction Ranking
Rank	Museum	Location	Country	Visitors (2025)
1	Natural History Museum	London	England	7,116,929
2	British Museum	London	England	6,479,952
3	Windsor Great Park	Berkshire	England	4,978,299
4	Tate Modern	London	England	4,514,266
5	National Gallery	London	England	4,147,544
6	Southbank Centre	London	England	3,423,648
7	Victoria and Albert Museum	London	England	3,332,300
8	Somerset House	London	England	2,895,010
9	Tower of London	London	England	2,817,852
10	Science Museum	London	England	2,640,417
11	Royal Museums Greenwich	London	England	2,364,348
12	National Museum of Scotland	Edinburgh	Scotland	2,318,305
13	Kew Gardens	London	England	2,250,355
14	Scottish National Gallery	Edinburgh	Scotland	1,999,196 (2024)
15	Edinburgh Castle	Edinburgh	Scotland	1,981,152 (2024)
16	Royal Albert Hall	London	England	1,753,371 (2024)
17	Westminster Abbey	London	England	1,717,296 (2024)
18	St Paul's Cathedral	London	England	1,499,575 (2023)
19	British Library	London	England	1,390,378 (2023)
20	Windsor Castle	Berkshire	England	1,374,607 (2023)
21	RHS Garden Wisley	Surrey	England	1,361,785
22	London Zoo	London	England	1,327,902
23	Stonehenge	Wiltshire	England	1,327,423
24	Barbican Centre	London	England	1,313,528
25	Kelvingrove Art Gallery and Museum	Glasgow	Scotland	1,283,882
26	Riverside Museum	Glasgow	Scotland	1,265,011
27	National Portrait Gallery	London	England	1,164,018
28	Tate Britain	London	England	1,091,218
29	Roman Baths and Grand Pump Room	Somerset	England	1,061,240
30	Royal Botanic Garden Edinburgh	Edinburgh	Scotland	1,041,391
31	Tower Bridge	London	England	960,670
32	Blenheim Palace	Oxfordshire	England	945,412
33	Horniman Museum and Gardens	London	England	924,480
34	Ashmolean Museum	Oxfordshire	England	900,277
35	Whipsnade Zoo	Bedfordshire	England	893,450
36	Royal Shakespeare Theatre and Swan Theatre	Warwickshire	England	883,627
37	Portsmouth Historic Dockyard	Hampshire	England	873,491
38	Old Royal Naval College	London	England	843,175
39	Bodleian Libraries	Oxfordshire	England	842,221
40	Imperial War Museum	London	England	841,575
41	Moors Valley Country Park	Dorset	England	820,958
42	Beamish Museum	County Durham	England	801,756
43	Titanic Belfast	Belfast	Northern Ireland	800,949
44	Longleat	Wiltshire	England	800,056
45	Shakespeare's Globe	London	England	799,942
46	National War Museum	Edinburgh	Scotland	773,213
47	Oxford University Museum of Natural History	Oxfordshire	England	768,986
48	Royal Ballet and Opera	London	England	750,851
49	Eden Project	Cornwall	England	713,255
50	Royal Academy of Arts	London	England	709,961

Attractions by nation or English county
Rank	Nation or English county	Amount each
1	Greater London	26
2	Scotland	7
3	Oxfordshire	4
4=	Berkshire; Wiltshire	2
6=	Bedfordshire; Cornwall; County Durham; Dorset; Hampshire; Northern Ireland; Somerset; Surrey; Warwickshire	1

== See also ==
- List of most visited art museums
- List of most-visited museums
