= Museum =

Institution preserving and interpreting collections or heritage

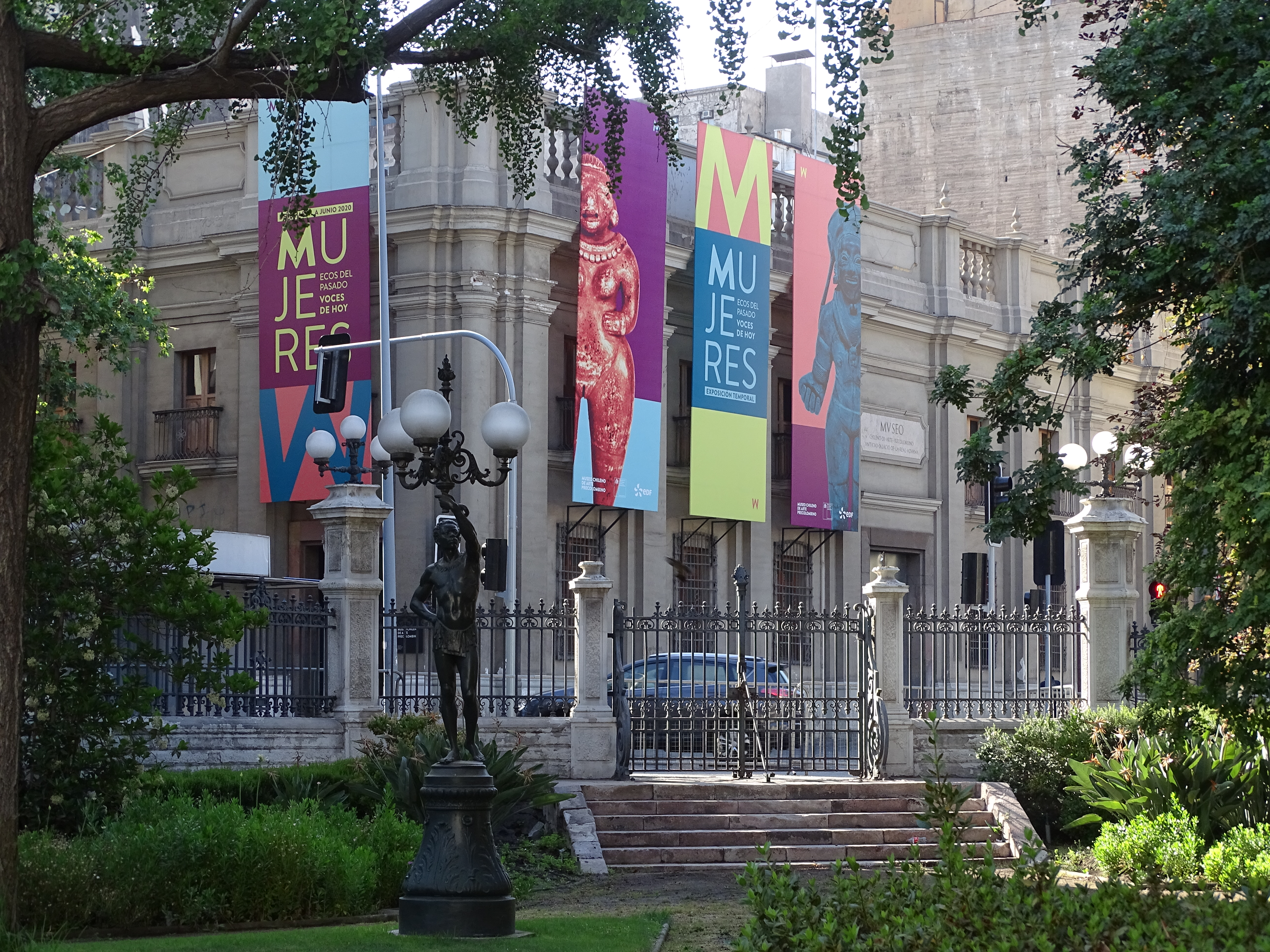
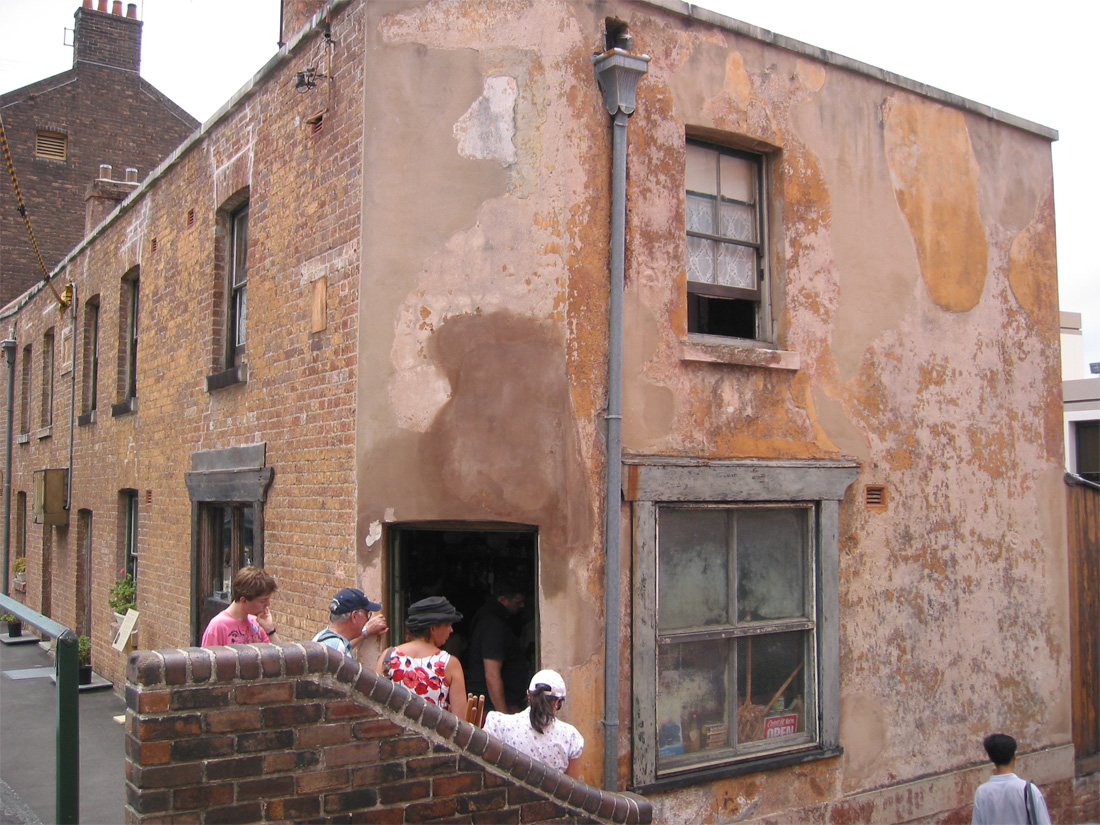
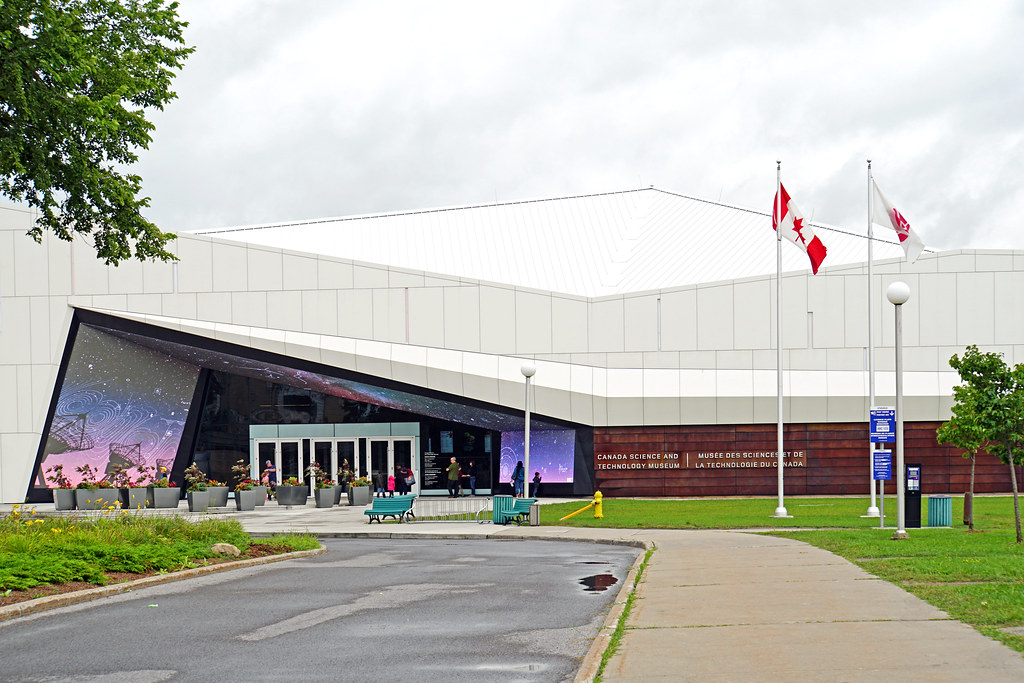
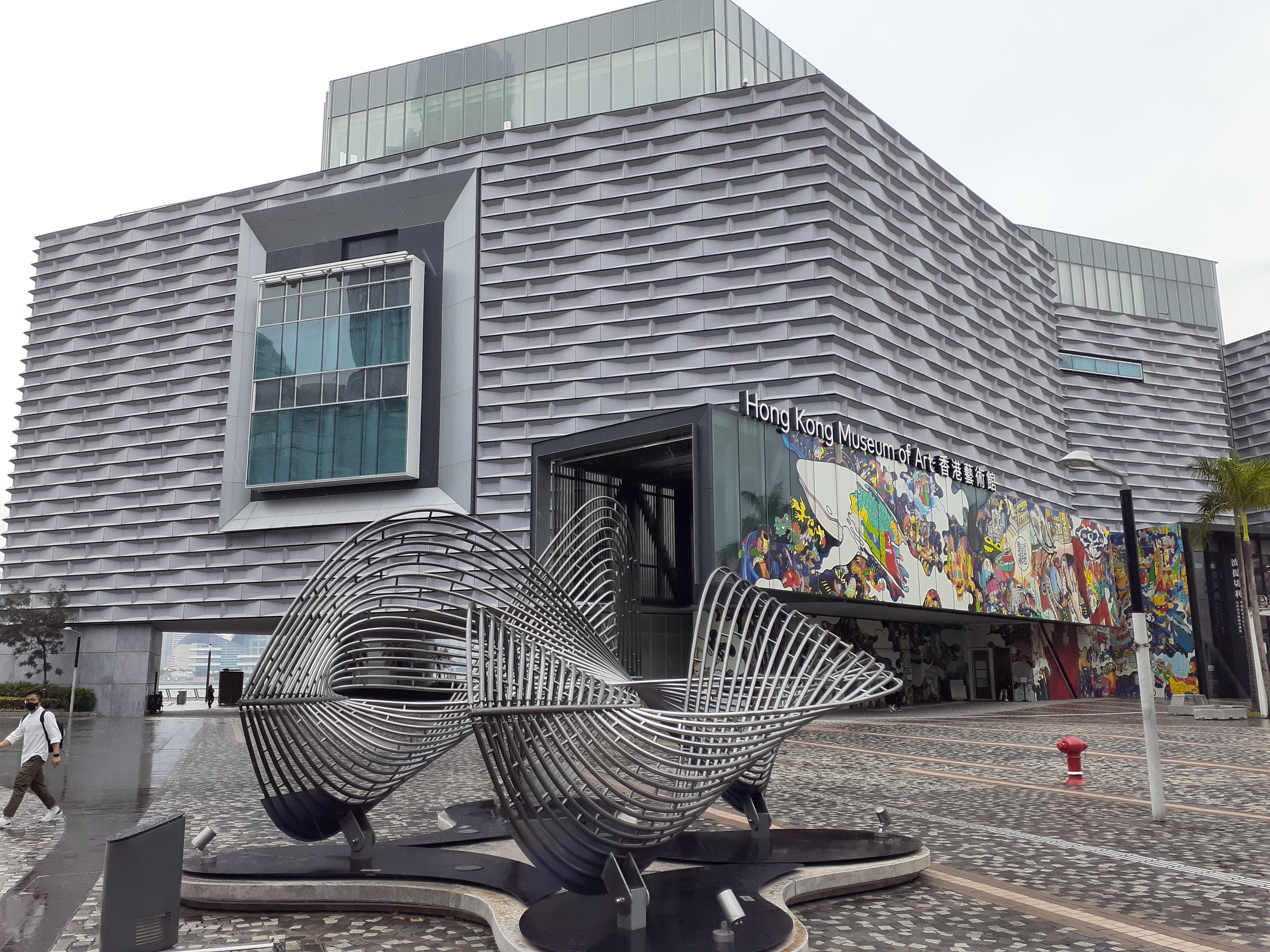
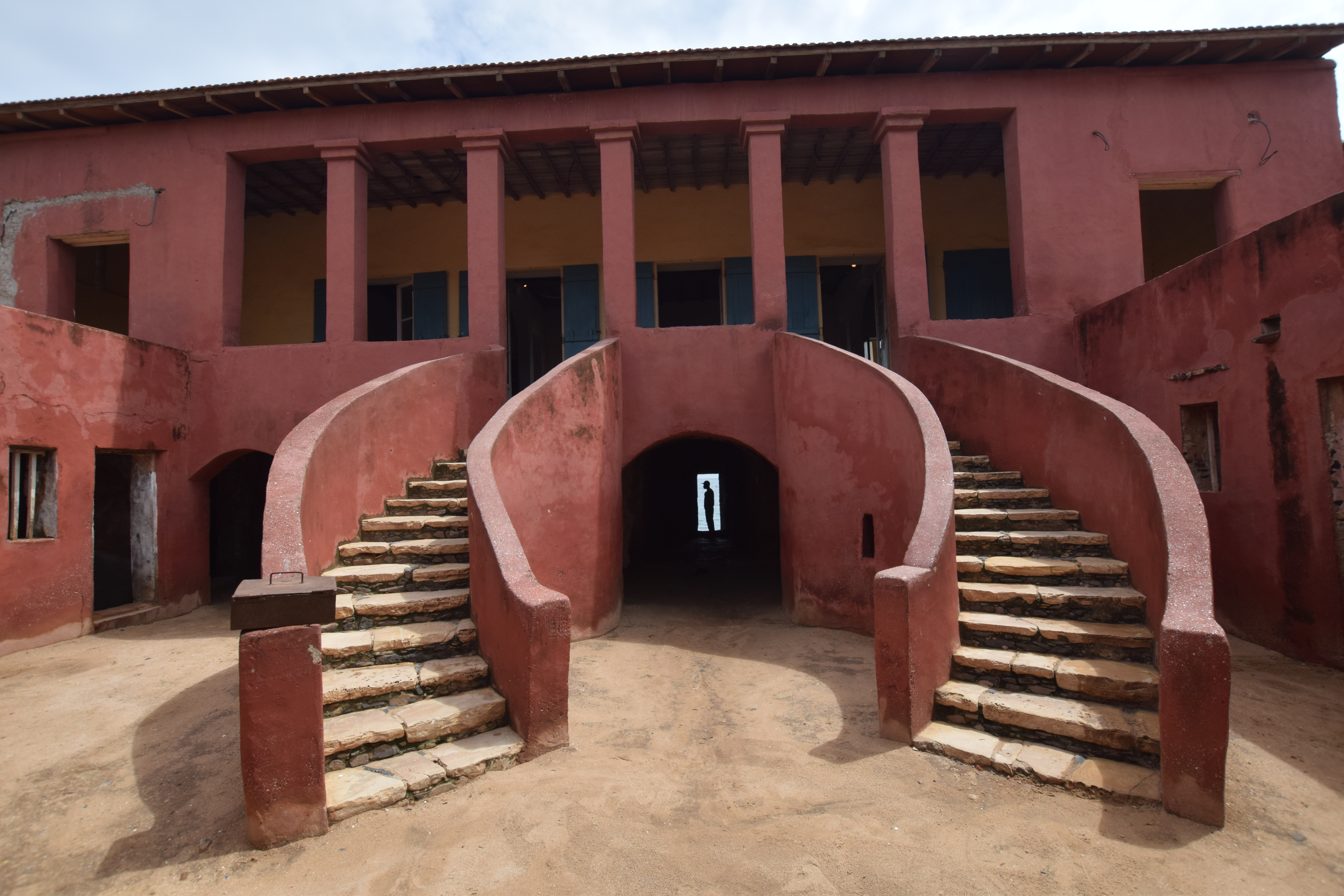
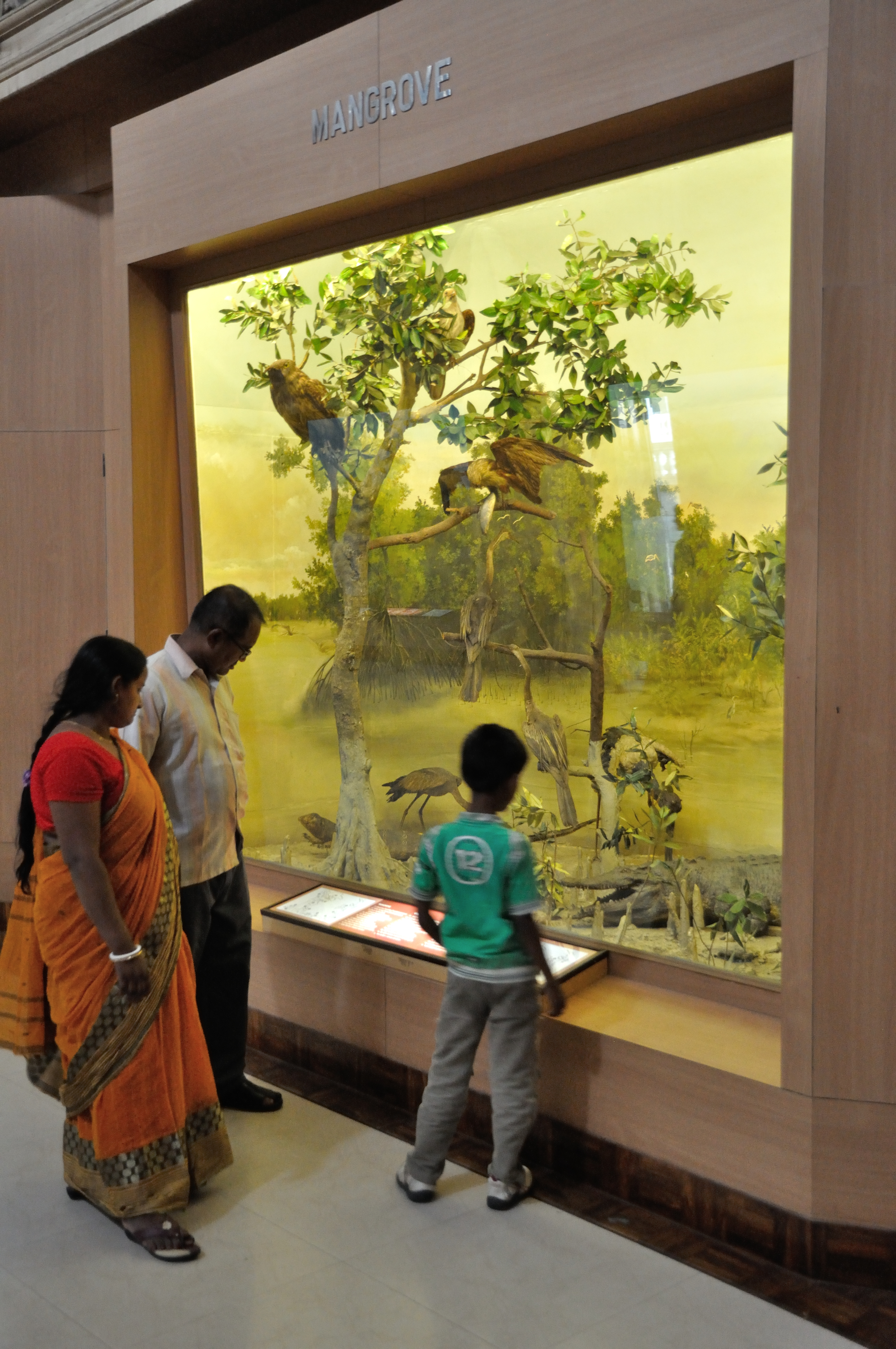
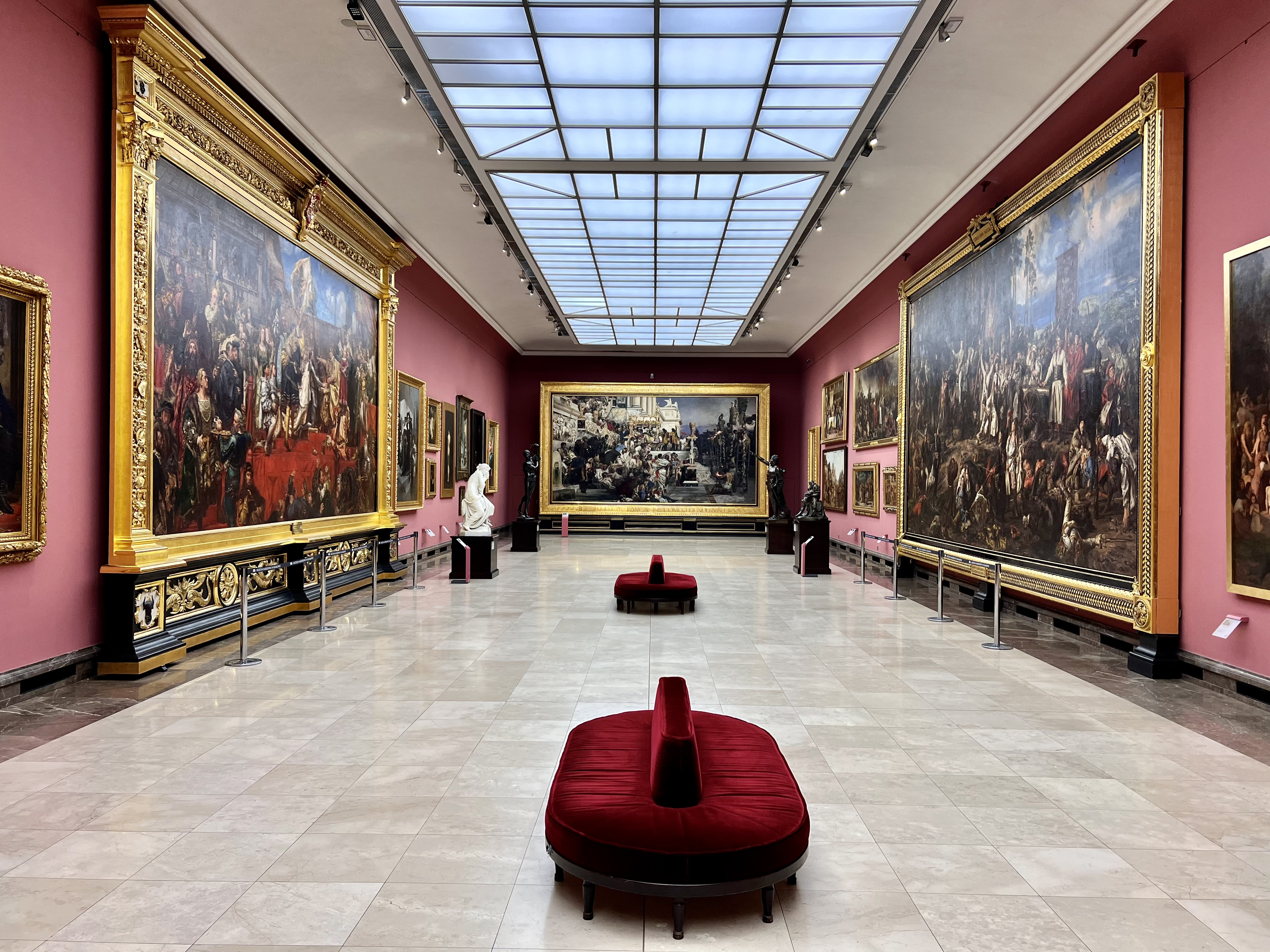
- The Museo Chileno de Arte Precolombino in Santiago, Chile Susannah Place in Sydney, Australia The Canada Science and Technology Museum in Ottawa, Canada The Hong Kong Museum of Art in Tsim Sha Tsui, Hong Kong The House of Slaves in Gorée, Senegal Diorama at the Indian Museum in Kolkata, India Gallery at the Sukiennice Museum in Kraków, Poland

A museum is an institution dedicated to displaying and preserving culturally or scientifically significant objects. Many museums have exhibitions of these objects on public display, and some have non-exhibited collections that are used by researchers and specialists. Museums hold a wide range of objects and often focus on a particular theme, such as the arts, science, natural history, or local history. Museums that host exhibitions and interactive demonstrations are often tourist attractions, and many draw large numbers of visitors from outside their host country, with the most visited museums in the world attracting millions of visitors annually.

Since the establishment of the earliest known museum in ancient times, museums have been associated with academia and the preservation of rare items. Museums originated as private collections of interesting items, and not until much later did the emphasis on educating the public take root.

== Etymology ==
The English word museum comes from Latin, and is pluralized as museums (or rarely, musea). It is originally from the Ancient Greek Μουσεῖον (mouseion), which denotes a place or temple dedicated to the muses (the patron divinities in Greek mythology of the arts), and hence was a building set apart for study and the arts, especially the Musaeum (institute) for philosophy and research at Alexandria, built under Ptolemy I Soter about 280 BC.

== Purpose ==
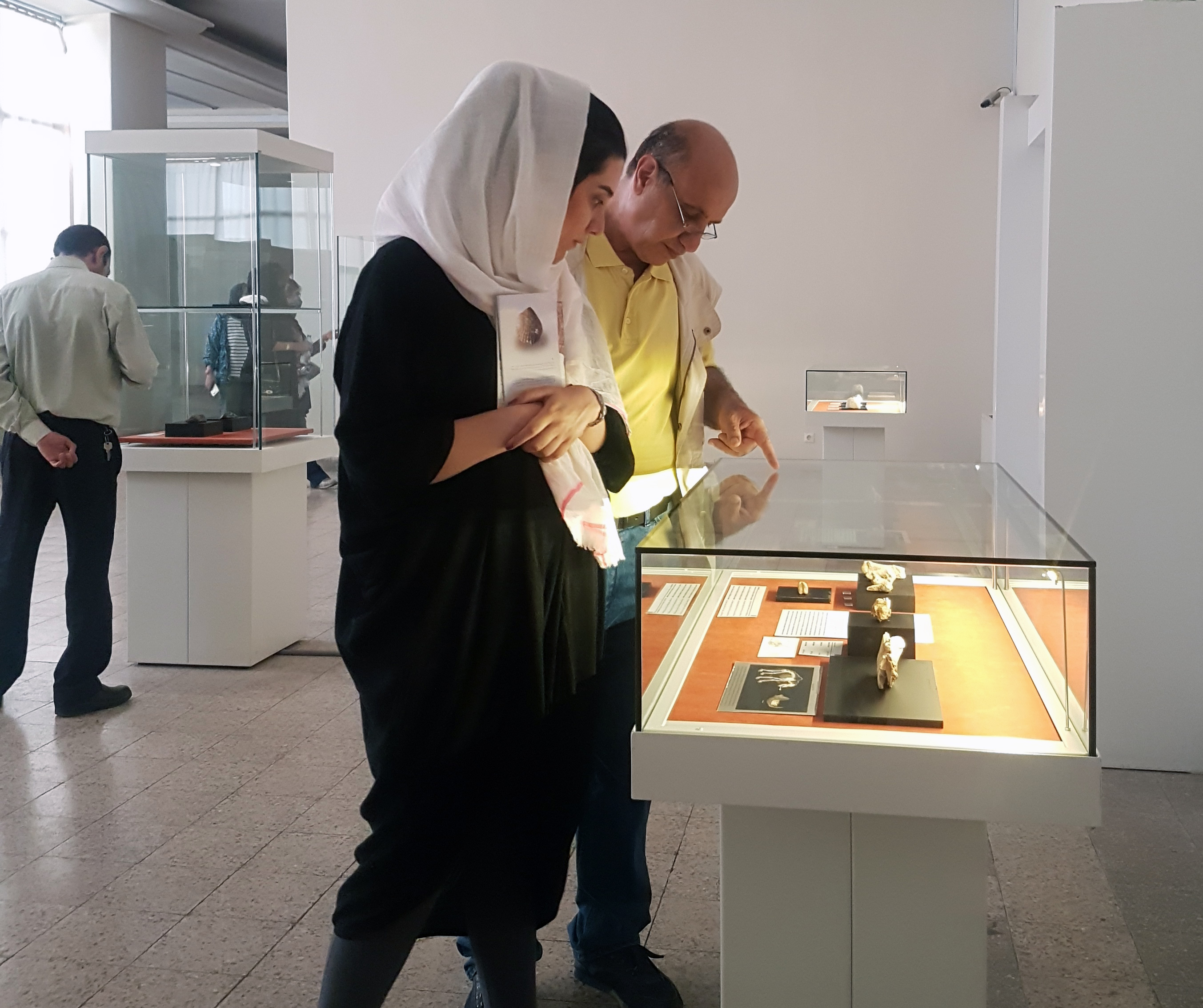
Visitors examining fossils displayed at the National Museum of Iran in Tehran, Iran

Museums serve to collect, preserve, interpret, and display objects of cultural, historical, or scientific significance. Their primary functions include stewardship of heritage for future generations and facilitating education through exhibitions and programs aligned with academic curricula.

Educational objectives remain central, with museums allocating significant resources to support formal and informal learning. The American Alliance of Museums (AAM) reports that U.S. museums contribute over 18 million instructional hours annually through guided tours, traveling exhibits, and teacher training. Economic impacts also factor into their societal role, as museums generate employment, stimulate tourism, and contribute tax revenue, with the AAM quantifying their annual GDP contribution at $50 billion.

Museum missions vary by institutional focus. Some prioritize education through interactive experiences. Others target specific audiences, like religious or local history organizations, while national museums aim for broad accessibility. Collections are curated according to mission statements, which dictate acquisition policies and conservation practices.

Preservation efforts address material degradation and ethical challenges. UNESCO's 2015 Recommendation underscores the need to combat illicit trafficking and promote sustainable conservation methods, such as climate-controlled storage and digital archiving. These measures ensure the physical integrity of artifacts while adhering to provenance research standards, particularly for items acquired during colonial eras.

=== Changing purpose over time ===
In the 19th century, museums focused mainly on scientific research and organizing collections, especially natural history specimens. They aimed to classify and study objects, often gathered through exploration and colonialism. Museums were mostly for scholars but began opening to the public to educate and improve society. Institutions like the Smithsonian Institution maintain research capabilities but integrate them with missions to "increase and diffuse knowledge", as outlined in James Smithson's founding bequest.

In the early 20th century, museums focused on collecting, studying, and preserving artifacts, with an emphasis on scientific research and authenticity. Exhibits were mostly static and aimed at scholars, often prioritizing the objects themselves over the visitor experience. In the latter half of the 20th century, reduced government funding pushed museums to rely more on private support and focus on attracting visitors to generate revenue. This shift led museums to prioritize public engagement, interactive exhibits, and economic contributions over traditional research and collecting.

In the 21st century, museums focus on being accessible and inclusive. They use digital tools to reach wider audiences through virtual tours and online collections. Museums encourage dialogue about current social issues and aim to represent diverse communities. While preserving and displaying objects remains important, museums now also have served as spaces for discussion and social change.

=== Definitions ===
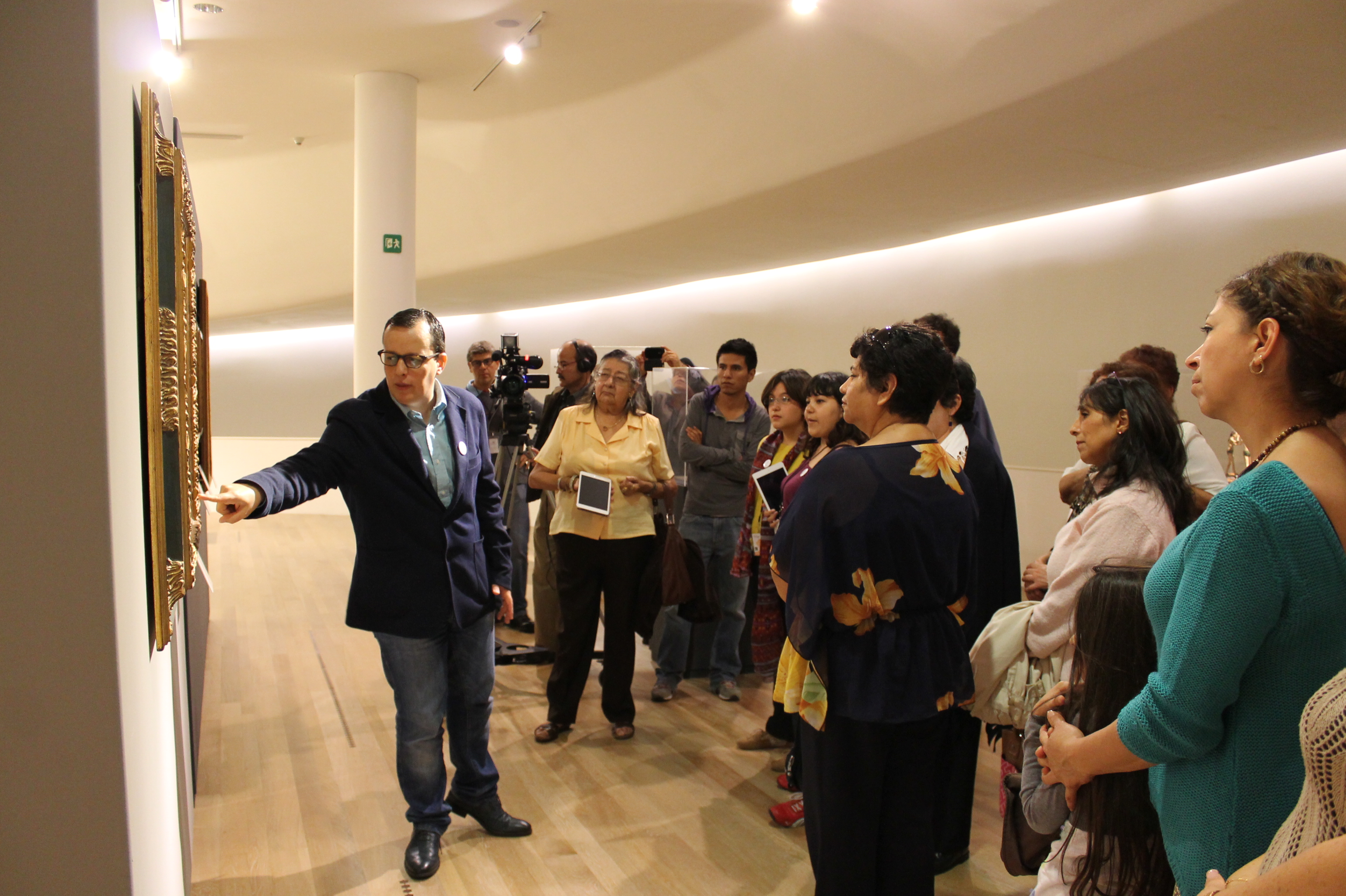
A guided tour group at the Soumaya Museum in Mexico City, Mexico

Major professional organizations from around the world offer some definitions as to what constitutes a museum, and their purpose. Common themes in all the definitions are public good and the care, preservation, and interpretation of collections.

The International Council of Museums' current definition of a museum (adopted in 2022): "A museum is a not-for-profit, permanent institution in the service of society that researches, collects, conserves, interprets and exhibits tangible and intangible heritage. Open to the public, accessible and inclusive, museums foster diversity and sustainability. They operate and communicate ethically, professionally and with the participation of communities, offering varied experiences for education, enjoyment, reflection and knowledge sharing."

The Canadian Museums Association's definition: "A museum is a non-profit, permanent establishment, that does not exist primarily for the purpose of conducting temporary exhibitions and that is open to the public during regular hours and administered in the public interest for the purpose of conserving, preserving, studying, interpreting, assembling and exhibiting to the public for the instruction and enjoyment of the public, objects and specimens or educational and cultural value including artistic, scientific, historical and technological material."

The United Kingdom's Museums Association's definition: "Museums enable people to explore collections for inspiration, learning and enjoyment. They are institutions that collect, safeguard and make accessible artifacts and specimens, which they hold in trust for society."

While the American Alliance of Museums does not have such a definition, their list of accreditation criteria to participate in their Accreditation Program states a museum must: "Be a legally organized nonprofit institution or part of a nonprofit organization or government entity; Be essentially educational in nature; Have a formally stated and approved mission; Use and interpret objects or a site for the public presentation of regularly scheduled programs and exhibits; Have a formal and appropriate program of documentation, care, and use of collections or objects; Carry out the above functions primarily at a physical facility or site; Have been open to the public for at least two years; Be open to the public at least 1,000 hours a year; Have accessioned 80 percent of its permanent collection; Have at least one paid professional staff with museum knowledge and experience; Have a full-time director to whom authority is delegated for day-to-day operations; Have the financial resources sufficient to operate effectively; Demonstrate that it meets the Core Standards for Museums; Successfully complete the Core Documents Verification Program".

Additionally, there is a legal definition of museum in United States legislation authorizing the establishment of the Institute of Museum and Library Services: "Museum means a public, tribal, or private nonprofit institution which is organized on a permanent basis for essentially educational, cultural heritage, or aesthetic purposes and which, using a professional staff: Owns or uses tangible objects, either animate or inanimate; Cares for these objects; and Exhibits them to the general public on a regular basis" (Museum Services Act 1976).

== History ==
=== Ancient ===
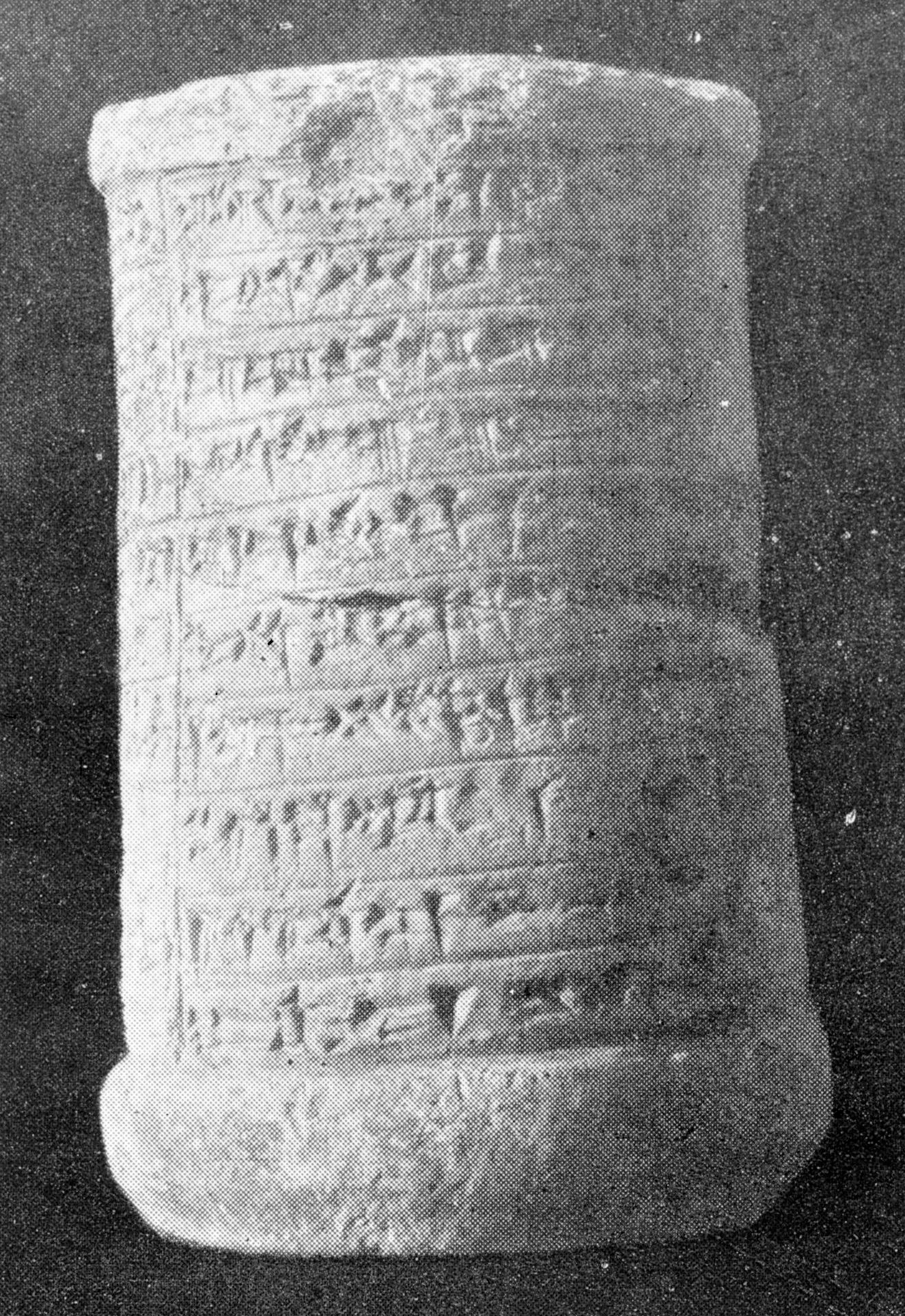
Bel-shalti-nannar's museum label (circa 530 BCE), first museum label known in the city of Ur (modern Tell el-Muqayyar, Iraq)

One of the oldest museums known is Ennigaldi-Nanna's museum, built by Princess Ennigaldi in modern Iraq at the end of the Neo-Babylonian Empire. The site dates from c. 530 BC, and contained artifacts from earlier Mesopotamian civilizations. Notably, a clay drum label—written in three languages—was found at the site, referencing the history and discovery of a museum item.

Ancient Greeks and Romans collected and displayed art and objects but perceived museums differently from modern-day views. In the classical period, the museums were the temples and their precincts which housed collections of votive offerings. Paintings and sculptures were displayed in gardens, forums, theaters, and bathhouses. In the ancient past there was little differentiation between libraries and museums with both occupying the building and were frequently connected to a temple or royal palace. The Museum of Alexandria, identical to the Library of Alexandria, was an inspiration during the early Renaissance period and thus originally libraries were called museums. The royal palaces and temples, such as the Roman temple of Peace, also functioned as a kind of museum outfitted with art and objects from conquered territories and gifts from ambassadors from other kingdoms allowing the ruler to display the amassed collections to guests and to visiting dignitaries.

Also in Alexandria from the time of Ptolemy II Philadelphus (r. 285–246 BCE), was the first zoological park. At first used by Philadelphus in an attempt to domesticate African elephants for use in war, the elephants were also used for show along with a menagerie of other animals specimens including hartebeests, ostriches, zebras, leopards, giraffes, rhinoceros, and pythons.

=== Early ===
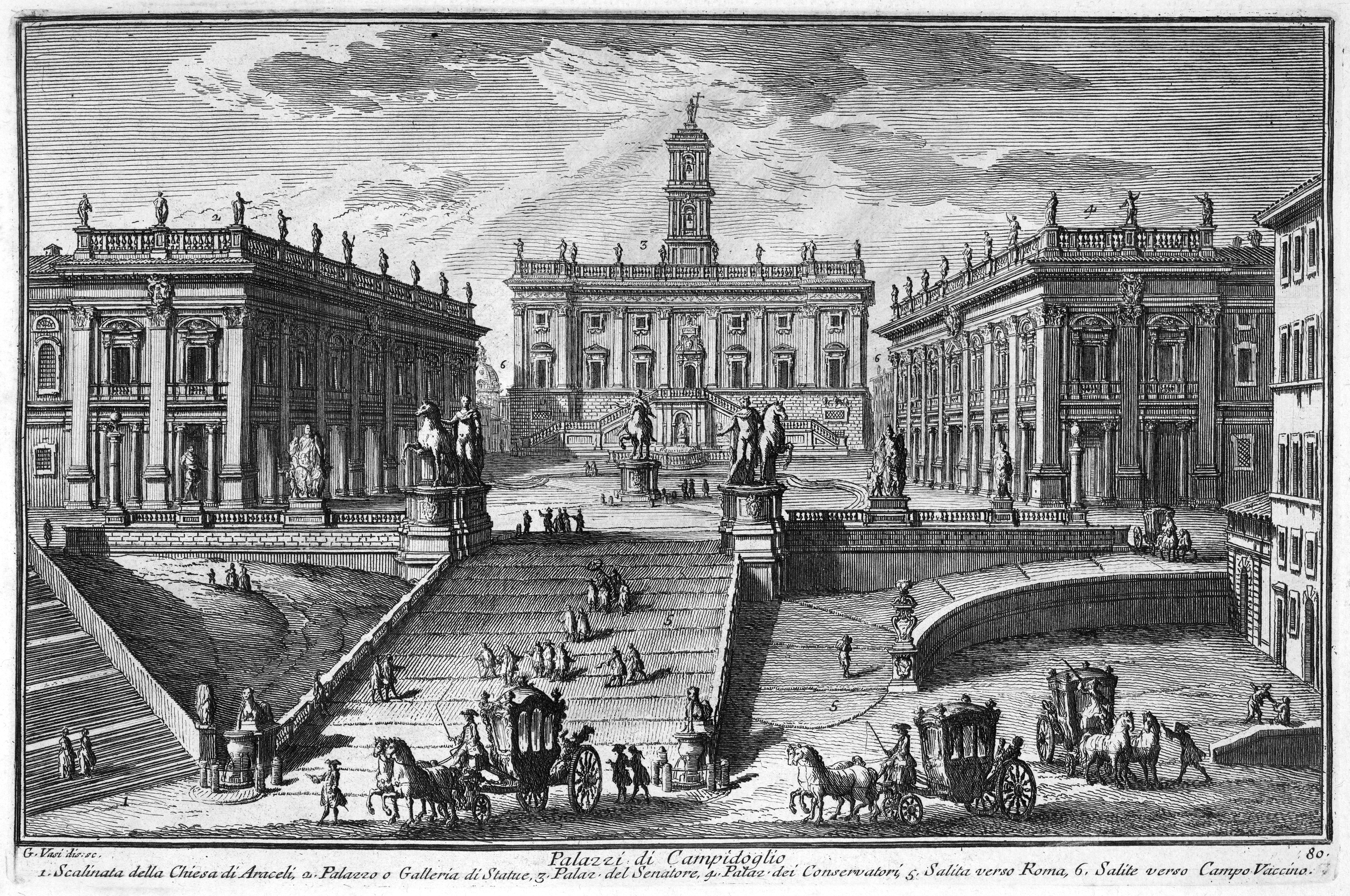
Palazzo dei Conservatori, Musei Capitolini ca. 1747

The Capitoline Museums (Musei Capitolini), located on the Capitoline Hill in Rome, Italy, are widely considered to be the world's oldest public museum. Their origins can be traced back to 1471 when Pope Sixtus IV donated a collection of important ancient bronze sculptures to the people of Rome. This initial donation, which included iconic pieces such as the Capitoline Wolf, marked the beginning of what would become a vast repository of Roman art and artifacts. The museums were officially opened to the public in 1734 under Pope Clement XII, establishing them as the first institution where art could be enjoyed by ordinary people rather than just the owners.

The Capitoline Museums' significance represent a crucial moment in the development of cultural institutions. Their creation symbolized a shift in the ownership and accessibility of art, transitioning from private collections to public patrimony. The museums' collections have grown over the centuries to include ancient Roman statues, medieval and Renaissance art, jewelry, coins, and other historic artifacts.

Vatican Museums (Musei Vaticani), located in Vatican City, Rome, houses an extensive collection of art and historical artifacts amassed by the Catholic Church over centuries traces its origins with the purchase of a single marble sculpture, Laocoön and His Sons, which was put on public display in 1506 by Pope Julius II.

Other early museums began as the private collections of wealthy individuals, families or institutions of art and rare or curious natural objects and artifacts. These were often displayed in so-called "wonder rooms" or cabinets of curiosities. These collections first emerged in western Europe, then spread into other parts of the world.

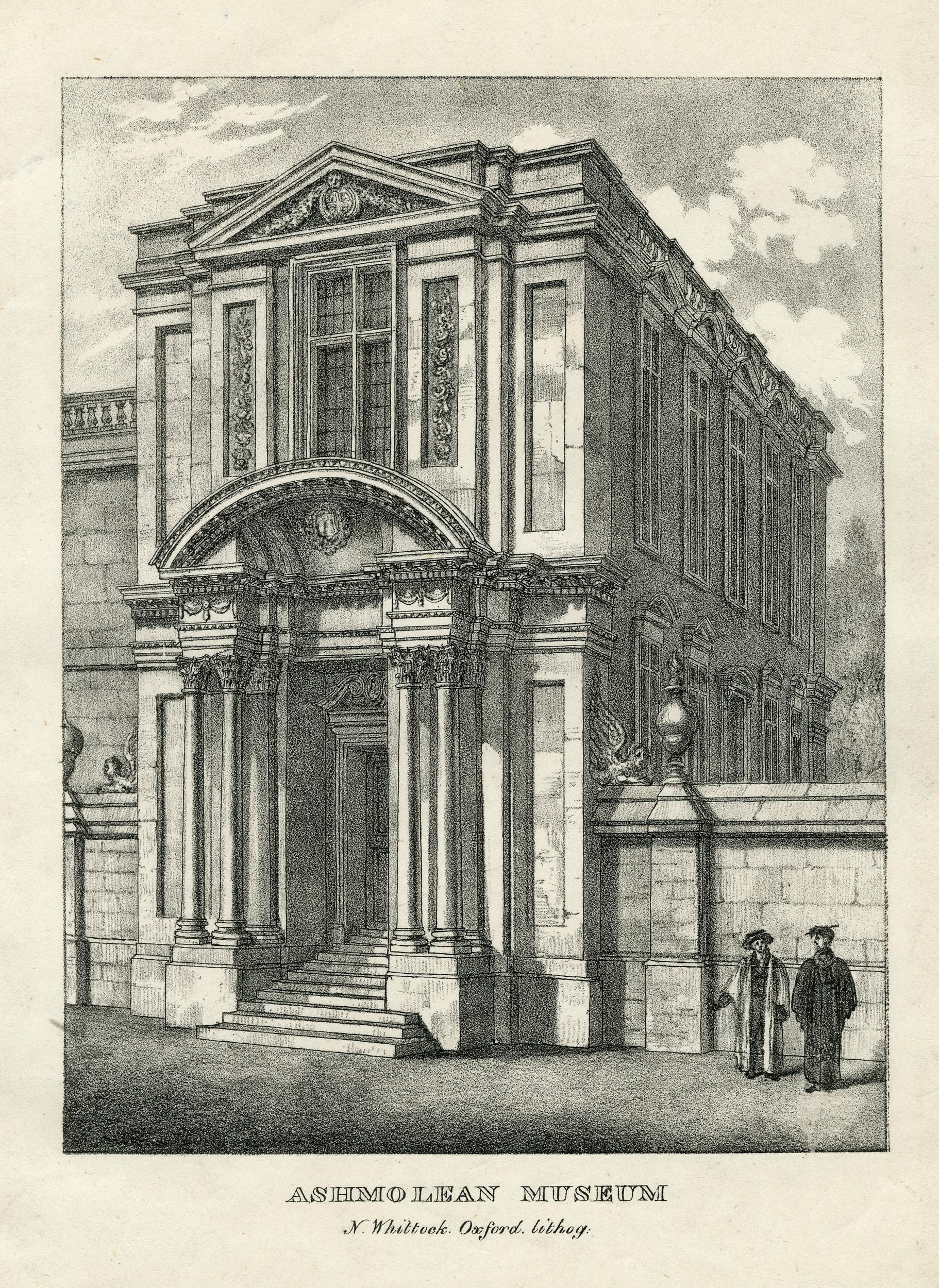
The old Ashmolean Museum building in Oxford, England

Public access to these collections was often possible only at the whim of the owner and his staff. One way that elite men during this time period gained a higher social status in the world of elites was by becoming a collector of these curious objects and displaying them. Many of the items in these collections were new discoveries and these collectors or naturalists, since many of these people held interest in natural sciences, were eager to obtain them. By putting their collections in a museum and on display, they not only got to show their fantastic finds but also used the museum as a way to sort and "manage the empirical explosion of materials that wider dissemination of ancient texts, increased travel, voyages of discovery, and more systematic forms of communication and exchange had produced".

One of these naturalists and collectors was Ulisse Aldrovandi, whose collection policy of gathering as many objects and facts about them was "encyclopedic" in nature, reminiscent of that of Pliny, the Roman philosopher and naturalist. The idea was to consume and collect as much knowledge as possible, to put everything they collected and everything they knew in these displays. In time, however, museum philosophy would change and the encyclopedic nature of information that was so enjoyed by Aldrovandi and his cohorts would be dismissed as well as "the museums that contained this knowledge". The 18th-century scholars of the Age of Enlightenment saw their ideas of the museum as superior and based their natural history museums on "organization and taxonomy" rather than displaying everything in any order after the style of Aldrovandi.

The Ashmolean Museum, founded in 1677 from the personal collection of Elias Ashmole, was set up in the University of Oxford to be open to the public. The collection included that of Elias Ashmole which he had collected himself, including objects he had acquired from the gardeners, travellers and collectors John Tradescant the elder and his son of the same name. The collection included antique coins, books, engravings, geological specimens, and zoological specimens—one of which was the stuffed body of the last dodo ever seen in Europe; but by 1755 the stuffed dodo was so moth-eaten that it was destroyed, except for its head and one claw. The museum opened on 24 May 1683, with naturalist Robert Plot as the first keeper. The first building, which became known as the Old Ashmolean, is sometimes attributed to Sir Christopher Wren or Thomas Wood.

When the British Museum opened to the public in 1759, it was a concern that large crowds could damage the artifacts. Prospective visitors to the British Museum had to apply in writing for admission, and small groups were allowed into the galleries each day. The British Museum became increasingly popular during the 19th century, amongst all age groups and social classes who visited the British Museum, especially on public holidays.

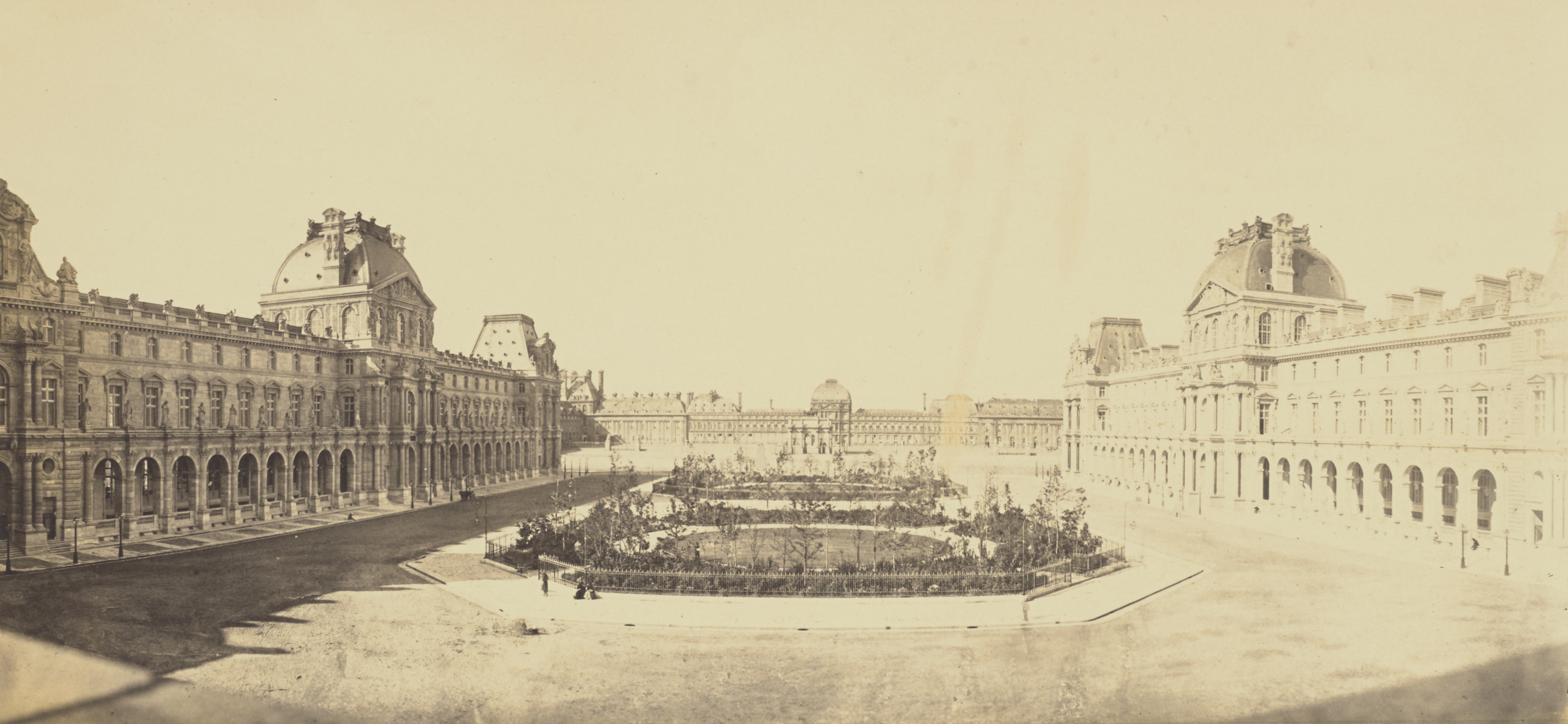
The Louvre in 1853

In France, the first public museum was the Louvre in Paris, opened in 1793 during the French Revolution, which enabled for the first time free access to the former French royal collections for people of all stations and status. The fabulous art treasures collected by the French monarchy over centuries were accessible to the public three days each "décade" (the 10-day unit which had replaced the week in the French Republican Calendar). The Conservatoire du muséum national des Arts (National Museum of Arts's Conservatory) was charged with organizing the Louvre as a national public museum and the centerpiece of a planned national museum system. As Napoléon I conquered the great cities of Europe, confiscating art objects as he went, the collections grew and the organizational task became more and more complicated. Following Napoleon's defeat in 1815, some of the treasures he had amassed were eventually returned to their owners. His plan was never fully realized, but his concept of a museum as an agent of nationalistic fervor had a profound influence throughout Europe.

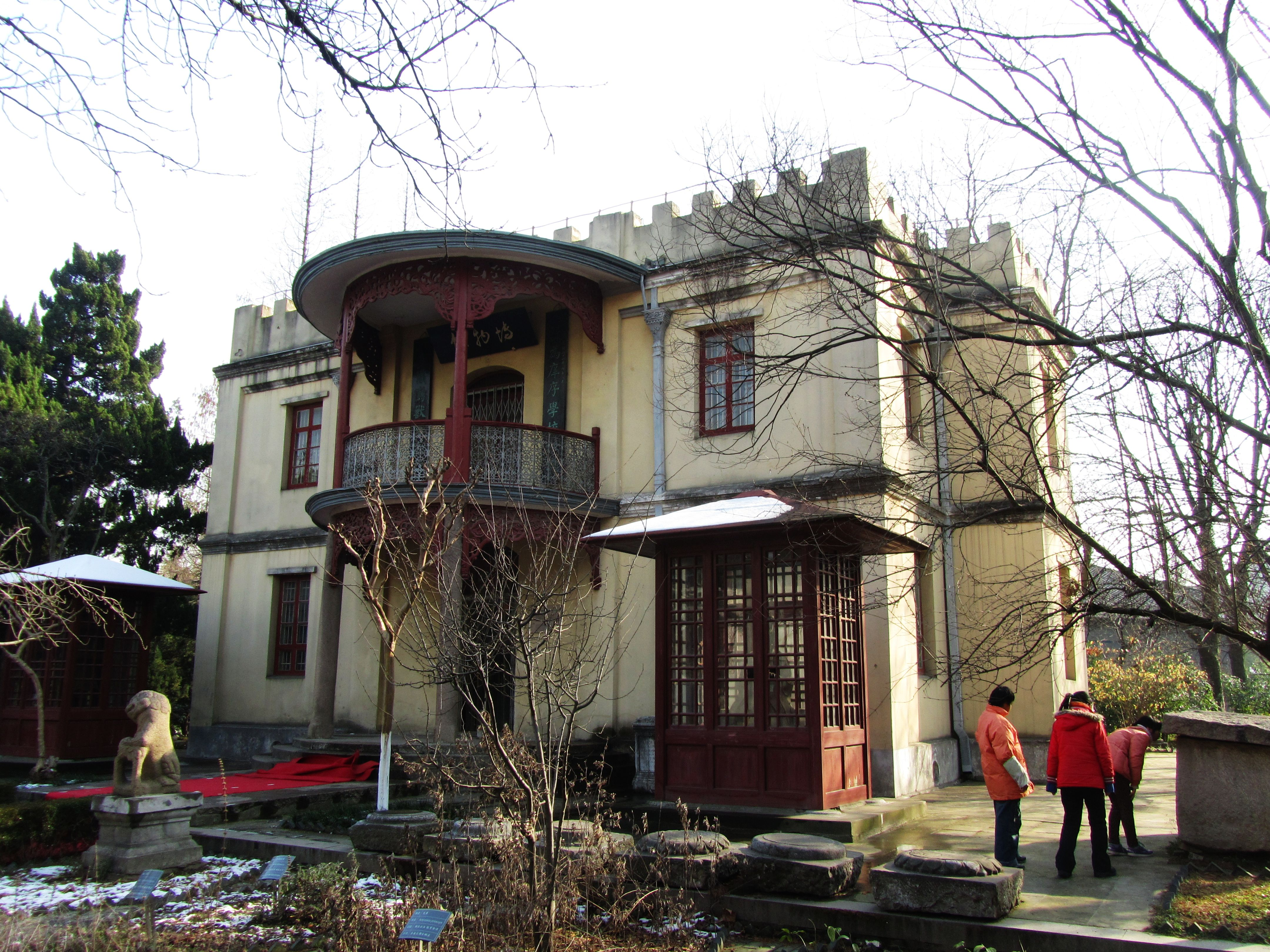
The Nantong Museum, the first Chinese-sponsored museum.

Chinese and Japanese visitors to Europe were fascinated by the museums they saw there, but had cultural difficulties in grasping their purpose and finding an equivalent Chinese or Japanese term for them. Chinese visitors in the early 19th century named these museums based on what they contained, so defined them as "bone amassing buildings" or "courtyards of treasures" or "painting pavilions" or "curio stores" or "halls of military feats" or "gardens of everything". Japan first encountered Western museum institutions when it participated in Europe's World's Fairs in the 1860s. The British Museum was described by one of their delegates as a 'hakubutsukan', a 'house of extensive things' – this eventually became accepted as the equivalent word for 'museum' in Japan and China.

=== Modern ===
American museums eventually joined European museums as the world's leading centers for the production of new knowledge in their fields of interest. A period of intense museum building, in both an intellectual and physical sense was realized in the late 19th and early 20th centuries (this is often called "The Museum Period" or "The Museum Age"). While many American museums, both natural history museums and art museums alike, were founded with the intention of focusing on the scientific discoveries and artistic developments in North America, many moved to emulate their European counterparts in certain ways (including the development of Classical collections from ancient Egypt, Greece, Mesopotamia, and Rome). Commercial museums also appeared in business schools in Europe and Japan.

Drawing on Michel Foucault's concept of liberal government, Tony Bennett has suggested the development of more modern 19th-century museums was part of new strategies by Western governments to produce a citizenry that, rather than be directed by coercive or external forces, monitored and regulated its own conduct. To incorporate the masses in this strategy, the private space of museums that previously had been restricted and socially exclusive were made public. As such, objects and artifacts, particularly those related to high culture, became instruments for these "new tasks of social management". Universities became the primary centers for innovative research in the United States well before the start of World War II. Nevertheless, museums to this day contribute new knowledge to their fields and continue to build collections that are useful for both research and display.

== Management ==
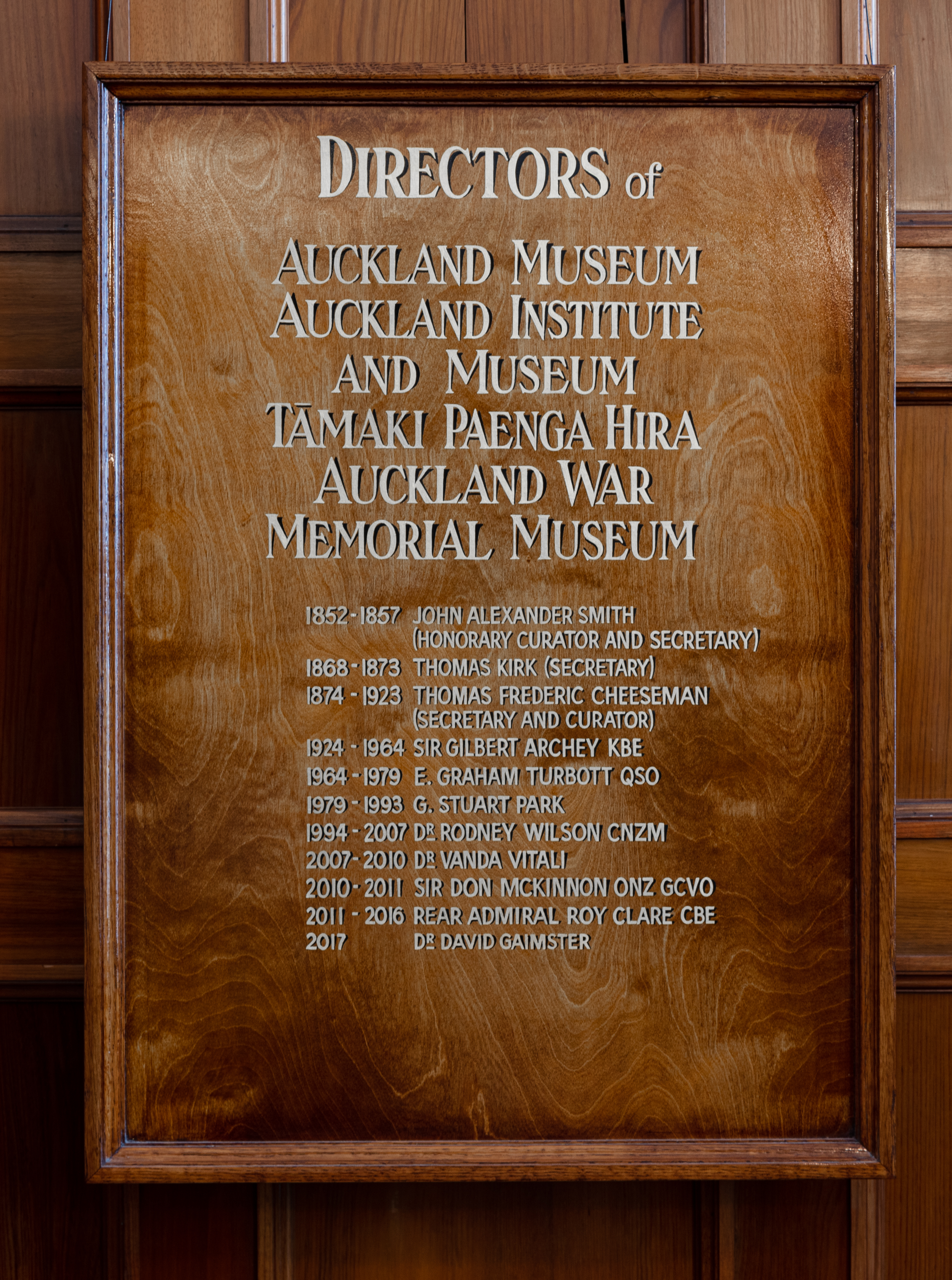
An Honour (Honors) board listing the directors of a museum in Auckland, New Zealand

The roles associated with the management of a museum largely depend on the size of the institution. Together, the Board and the Director establish a system of governance that is guided by policies that set standards for the institution. Documents that set these standards include an institutional or strategic plan, institutional code of ethics, bylaws, and collections policy. The American Alliance of Museums (AAM) has also formulated a series of standards and best practices that help guide the management of museums.

- Board of Trustees or Board of directors – The board governs the museum and is responsible for ensuring the museum is financially and ethically sound. They set standards and policies for the museum. Board members are often involved in fundraising aspects of the museum and represent the institution. Some museums use the terms "directors" and "trustees" interchangeably but both are different legal instruments. A board of directors governs a nonprofit corporation, a board of trustees is responsible for governing a charitable, educational, scientific, or religious trust, foundation, or endowment. In the case of small museums and all volunteer museums, a board may be more hands-on in the day-to-day operations of the museum.
- Executive Director – Executive directors at museums lead organizations by setting goals, managing operations, and overseeing staff. They work with boards to develop policies and secure funding through grants, donations, and partnerships. Executive directors represent the museum to the public, government, and other institutions. They make decisions about budgets, programs, and long-term planning. Executive directors ensure compliance with laws and ethical standards. They support staff in carrying out the museum's mission and foster relationships with community members, donors, and stakeholders. Their leadership shapes the direction and sustainability of the museum.

Various positions within the museum carry out the policies established by the Board and the Director. All museum employees should work together toward the museum's institutional goal. Here is a list of positions commonly found at museums:

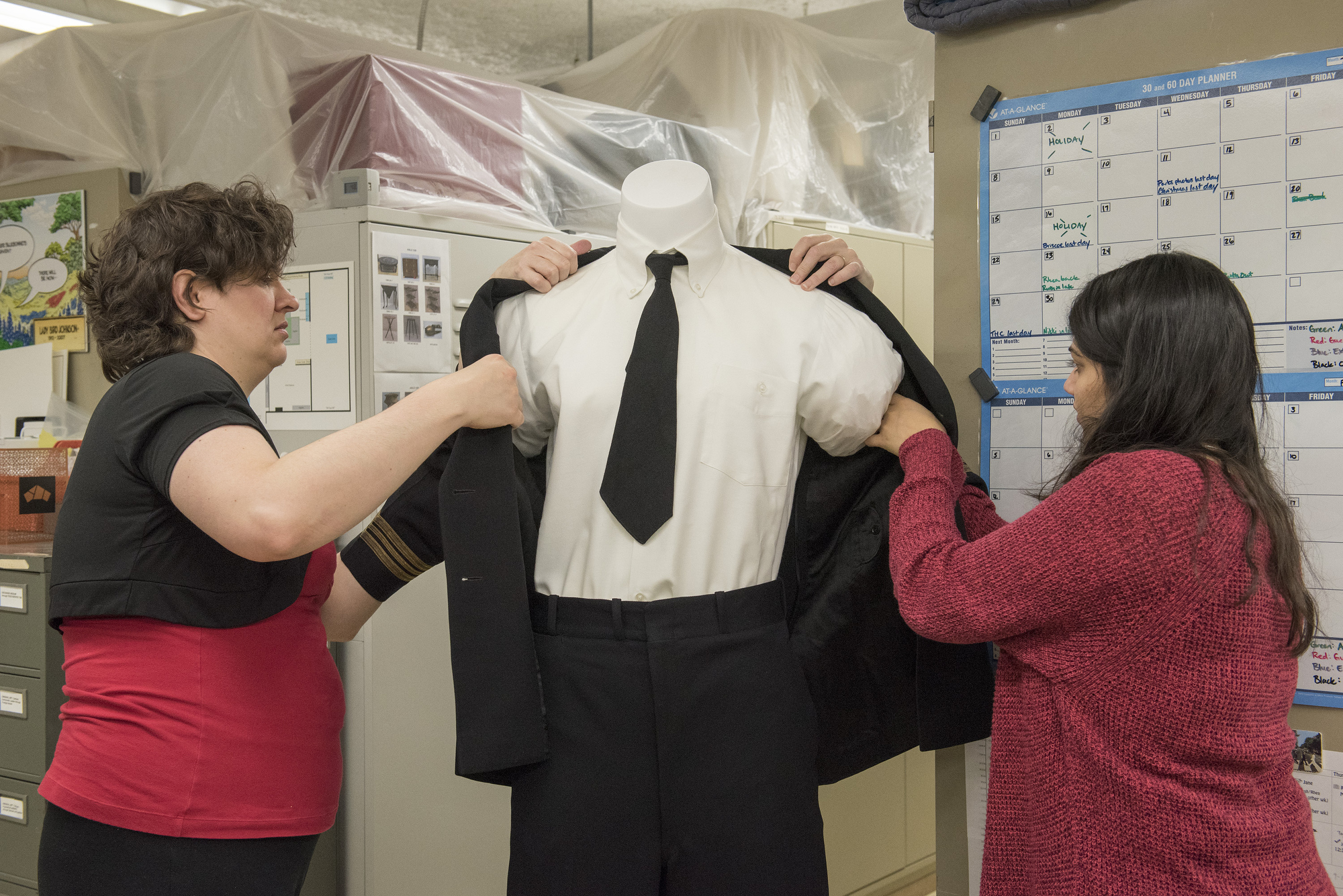
A curator and exhibit designer dressing a mannequin for an exhibit.

- Curator – Museum curators oversee collections of art, historical objects, or scientific specimens. They research items, determine authenticity, and organize exhibitions. Curators develop educational programs and collaborate with other institutions for loans or joint projects. They manage acquisition, documentation, and preservation of collection items. Curators also interact with the public, answer questions, and contribute to publications. Their work ensures that collections remain accessible and relevant for research, education, and community engagement.

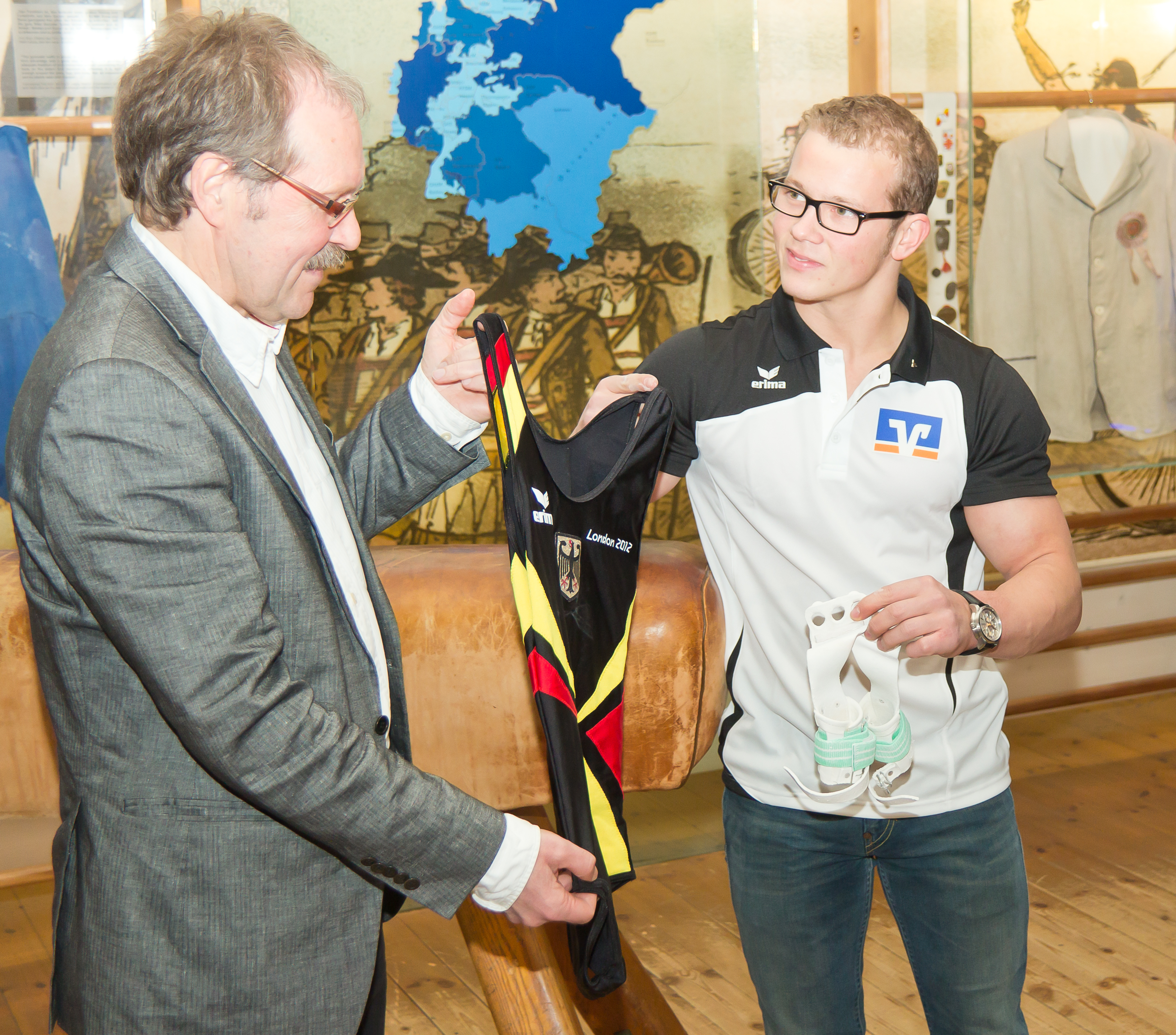
Collection manager receiving item for acquisitions.

- Collections Manager – Collections managers are responsible for the care, documentation, and movement of objects within a museum's collection. Their duties include maintaining accurate records, cataloging artifacts, and updating databases to ensure intellectual and physical control of each item. They coordinate packing, transport, and storage of objects, following protocols to prevent loss or damage and implementing procedures for conservation and pest control. Collections managers conduct regular inventories, monitor environmental conditions, and support curators, researchers, and exhibit staff by providing access to objects and information. Their work ensures that collections are organized, secure, and accessible for study and exhibition, in accordance with ethical and professional standards for collections stewardship.
- Registrar – Museum registrars manage the documentation, care, and movement of objects in a museum's collection. They maintain records and databases for all objects owned by or on loan to the museum, ensuring that information is accurate and up to date. Registrars coordinate the logistics of loans, including packing, shipping, insurance, and customs arrangements for incoming and outgoing objects. They oversee accessioning, cataloging, labeling, and condition reporting for new acquisitions and existing items. Registrars also ensure compliance with legal and ethical standards, prepare and review loan agreements and legal documents, and support exhibition planning by working with curators and other staff.
- Educator – Museum educators are responsible for educating museum audiences. Their duties can include designing tours and public programs for children and adults, teacher training, developing classroom and continuing education resources, community outreach, and volunteer management. Educators not only work with the public, but also collaborate with other museum staff on exhibition and program development to ensure that exhibits are audience-friendly.
- Exhibit Designer – Museum exhibit designers create layouts and structures for displays that present objects or information to visitors. They work with curators and educators to understand the goals and content of each exhibition. Exhibit designers select materials, plan lighting, and arrange items to guide visitor movement and focus. They produce drawings, models, and digital renderings to communicate ideas to staff and contractors. Exhibit designers oversee installation, ensure safety standards, and address technical requirements for multimedia or interactive elements. Their work supports the museum's mission by shaping how visitors experience and understand exhibitions.

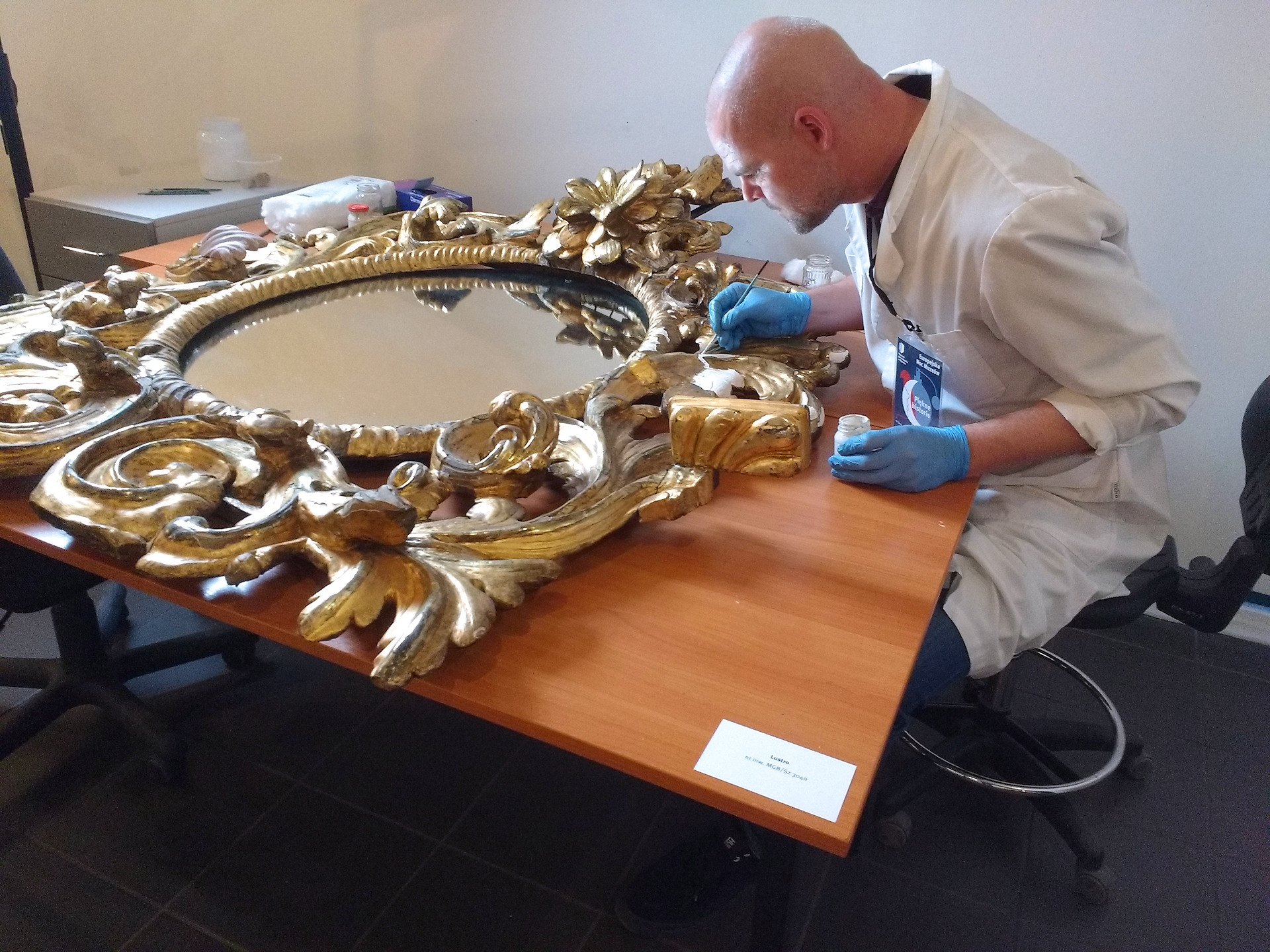
Restoration of a gilded mirror by a conservator.

- Conservator – Museum conservators are responsible for the preservation, examination, documentation, and treatment of objects in museum collections. They assess the condition of artifacts, identify causes of deterioration, and implement conservation strategies to slow or prevent further damage. Conservators may restore damaged items, clean and stabilize objects, and recommend appropriate storage, display, and environmental conditions. Their work involves scientific research, record-keeping, and collaboration with curators, scientists, and other specialists to ensure ethical and effective care of cultural heritage. Conservators also develop emergency response plans and may provide training or guidance to staff and volunteers involved in conservation activities.

Other positions commonly found at museums include: building operator, public programming staff, photographer, librarian, archivist, groundskeeper, volunteer coordinator, preparator, security staff, development officer, membership officer, business officer, gift shop manager, public relations staff, and graphic designer.

At smaller museums, staff members often fulfill multiple roles. Some of these positions are excluded entirely or may be carried out by a contractor when necessary.

=== Protection ===
The cultural property stored in museums is threatened in many countries by natural disaster, war, terrorist attacks or other emergencies. To this end, an internationally important aspect is a strong bundling of existing resources and the networking of existing specialist competencies in order to prevent any loss or damage to cultural property or to keep damage as low as possible. International partner for museums is UNESCO and Blue Shield International in accordance with the Hague Convention for the Protection of Cultural Property from 1954 and its 2nd Protocol from 1999. For legal reasons, there are many international collaborations between museums, and the local Blue Shield organizations.

Blue Shield has conducted extensive missions to protect museums and cultural assets in armed conflict, such as 2011 in Egypt and Libya, 2013 in Syria and 2014 in Mali and Iraq. During these operations, the looting of the collection is to be prevented in particular.

=== Gallery–museum storage ===
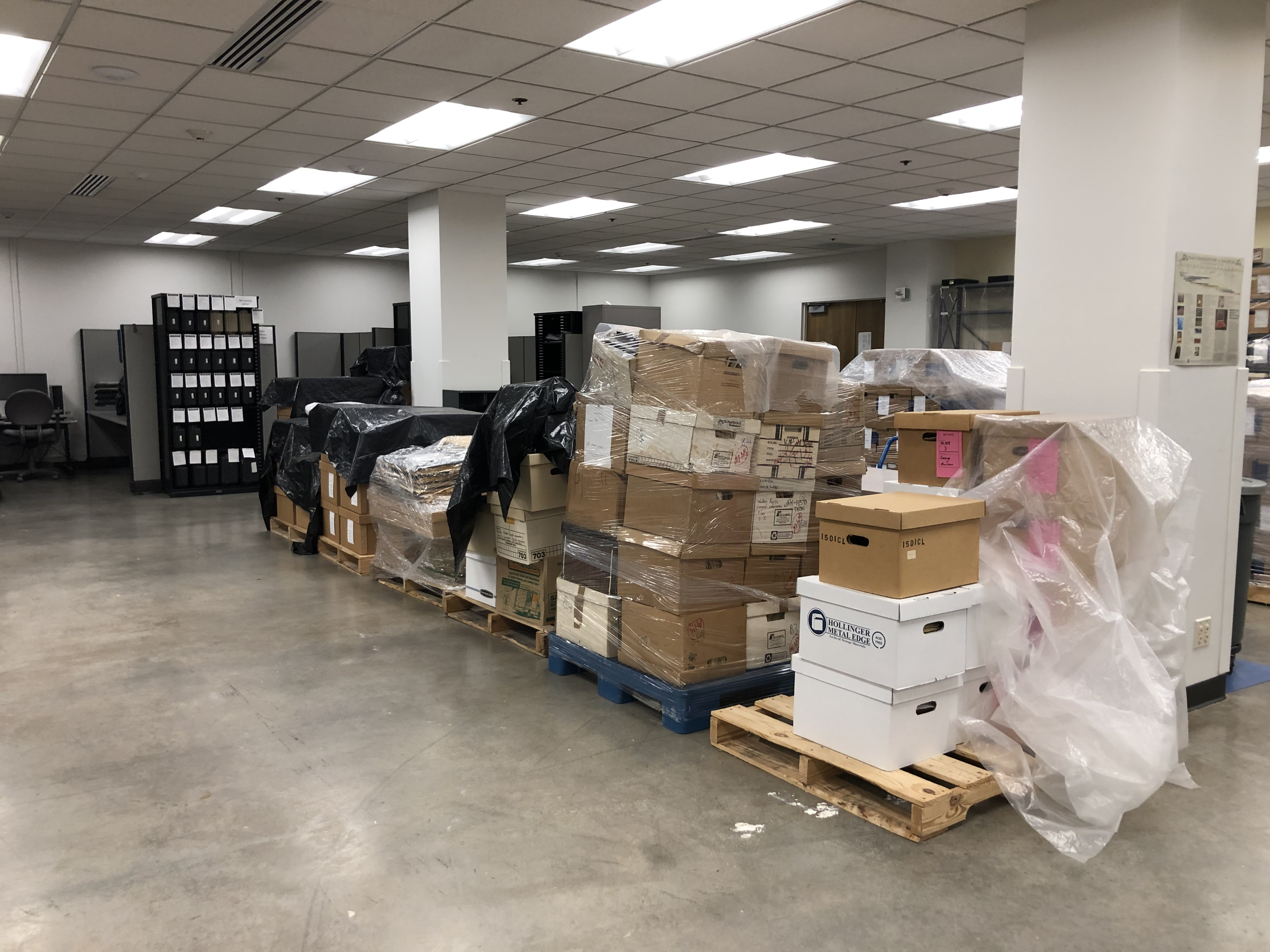
Archive processing rooms provide a space for archivists to arrange and describe archival materials to make them accessible to researchers.

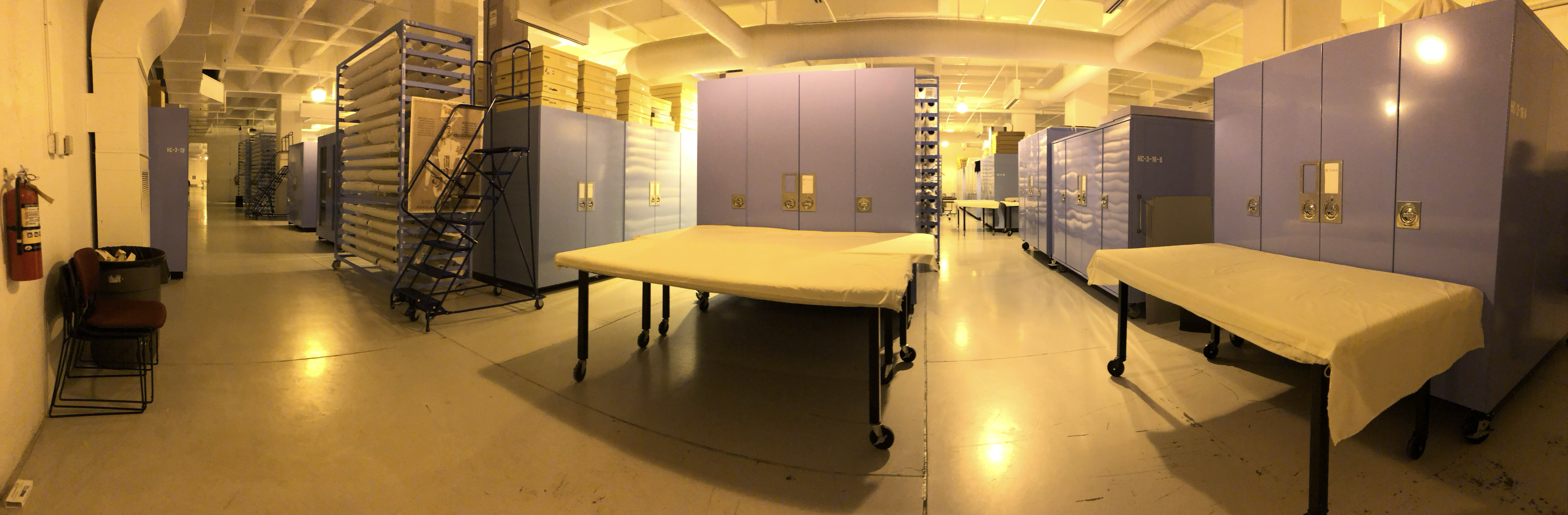
Museum textile storage includes rolled storage racks, hanging wardrobe and garments shelving, and cabinets.

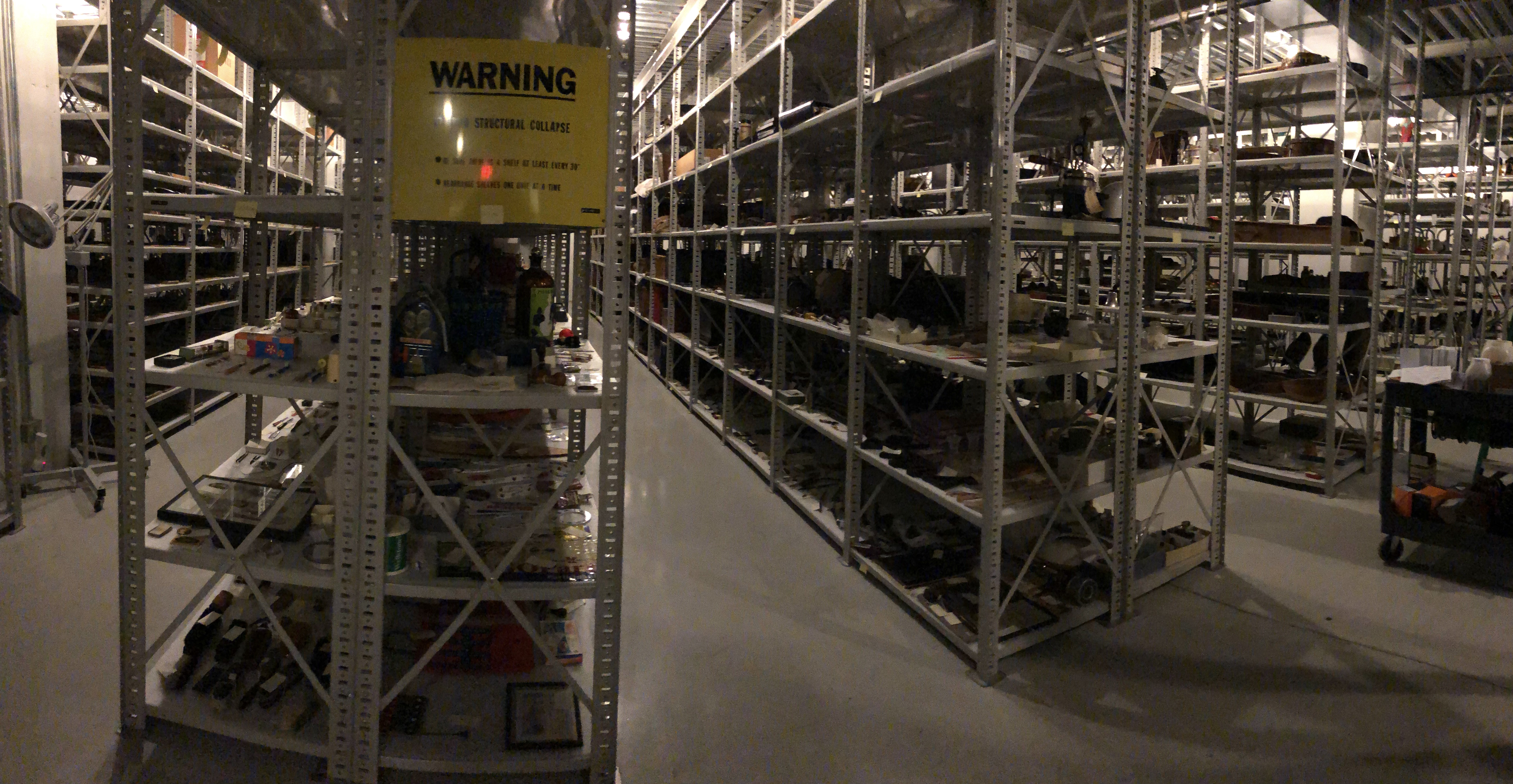
Collections storage for three-dimensional historic artifacts.

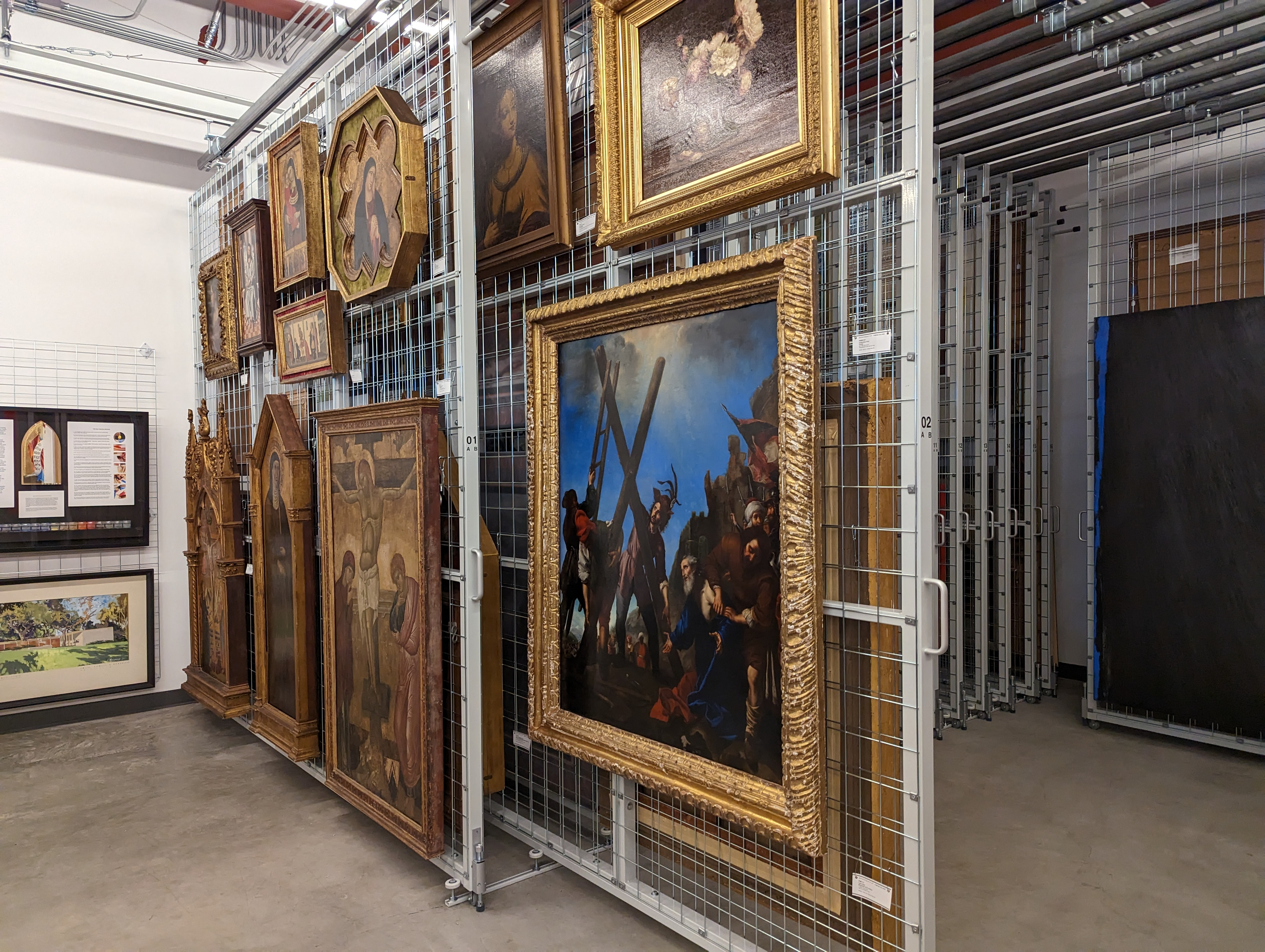
In museums, paintings, framed and unframed, are normally hung on sliding or fixed racking.

== Planning ==
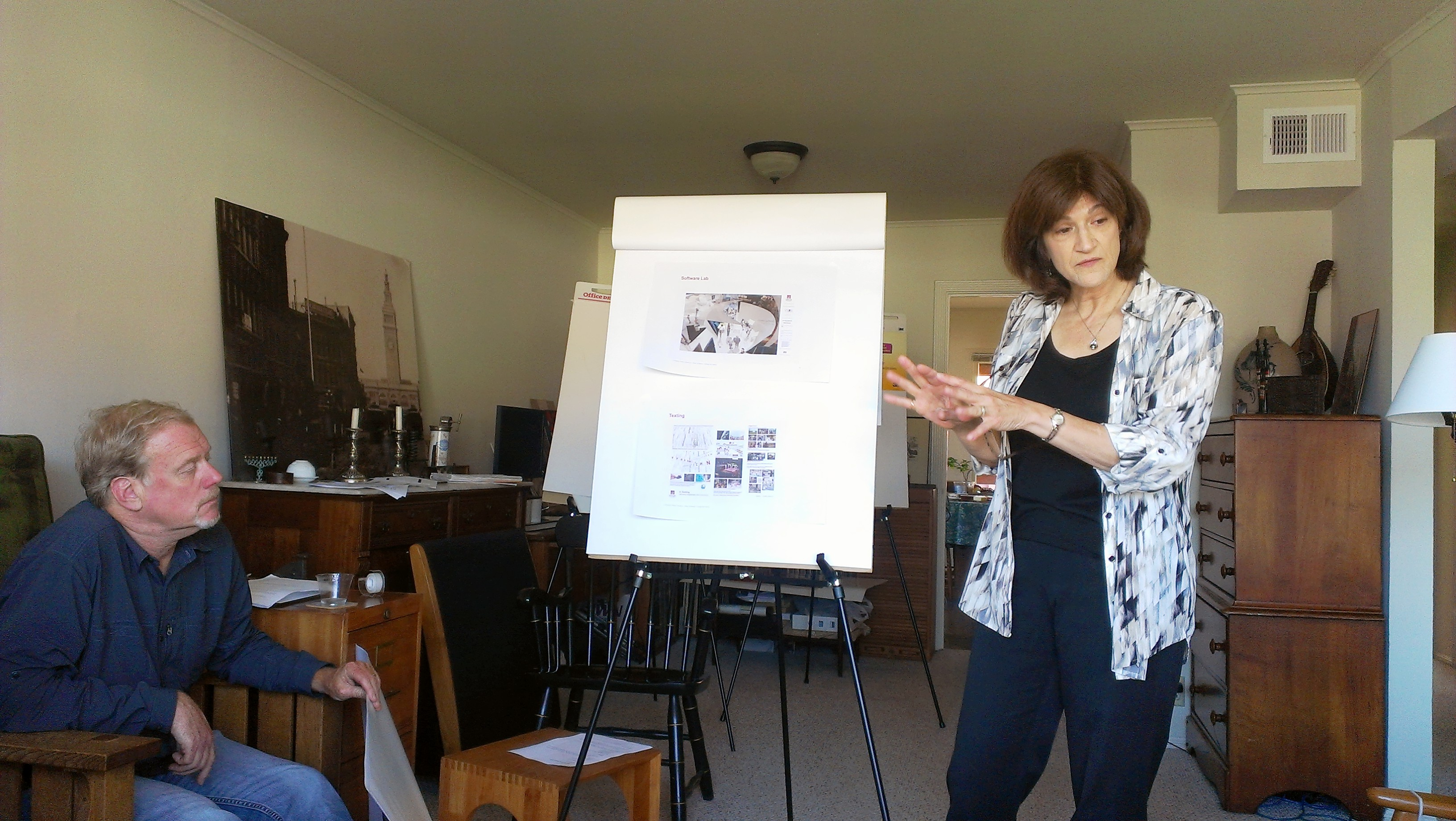
Exhibit planning

The design of museums has evolved throughout history. However, museum planning involves planning the actual mission of the museum along with planning the space that the collection of the museum will be housed in. Intentional museum planning has its beginnings with the museum founder and librarian John Cotton Dana. Dana detailed the process of founding the Newark Museum in a series of books in the early 20th century so that other museum founders could plan their museums. Dana suggested that potential founders of museums should form a committee first, and reach out to the community for input as to what the museum should supply or do for the community. According to Dana, museums should be planned according to community's needs:

"The new museum ... does not build on an educational superstition. It examines its community's life first, and then straightway bends its energies to supplying some the material which that community needs, and to making that material's presence widely known, and to presenting it in such a way as to secure it for the maximum of use and the maximum efficiency of that use."

The way that museums are planned and designed vary according to what collections they house, but overall, they adhere to planning a space that is easily accessed by the public and easily displays the chosen artifacts. These elements of planning have their roots with John Cotton Dana, who was perturbed at the historical placement of museums outside of cities, and in areas that were not easily accessed by the public, in gloomy European style buildings.

Questions of accessibility continue to the present day. Many museums strive to make their buildings, programming, ideas, and collections more publicly accessible than in the past. Not every museum is participating in this trend, but that seems to be the trajectory of museums in the twenty-first century with its emphasis on inclusiveness. One pioneering way museums are attempting to make their collections more accessible is with open storage. Most of a museum's collection is typically locked away in a secure location to be preserved, but the result is most people never get to see the vast majority of collections. The Brooklyn Museum's Luce Center for American Art practices this open storage where the public can view items not on display, albeit with minimal interpretation. The practice of open storage is all part of an ongoing debate in the museum field of the role objects play and how accessible they should be.

In terms of modern museums, interpretive museums, as opposed to art museums, have missions reflecting curatorial guidance through the subject matter which now include content in the form of images, audio and visual effects, and interactive exhibits. Museum creation begins with a museum plan, created through a museum planning process. The process involves identifying the museum's vision and the resources, organization and experiences needed to realize this vision. A feasibility study, analysis of comparable facilities, and an interpretive plan are all developed as part of the museum planning process.

Some museum experiences have very few or no artifacts and do not necessarily call themselves museums, and their mission reflects this; the Griffith Observatory in Los Angeles and the National Constitution Center in Philadelphia, being notable examples where there are few artifacts, but strong, memorable stories are told or information is interpreted. In contrast, the United States Holocaust Memorial Museum in Washington, D.C. uses many artifacts in their memorable exhibitions.

Museums are laid out in a specific way for a specific reason and each person who enters the doors of a museum will see its collection completely differently to the person behind them.

=== Financial uses ===
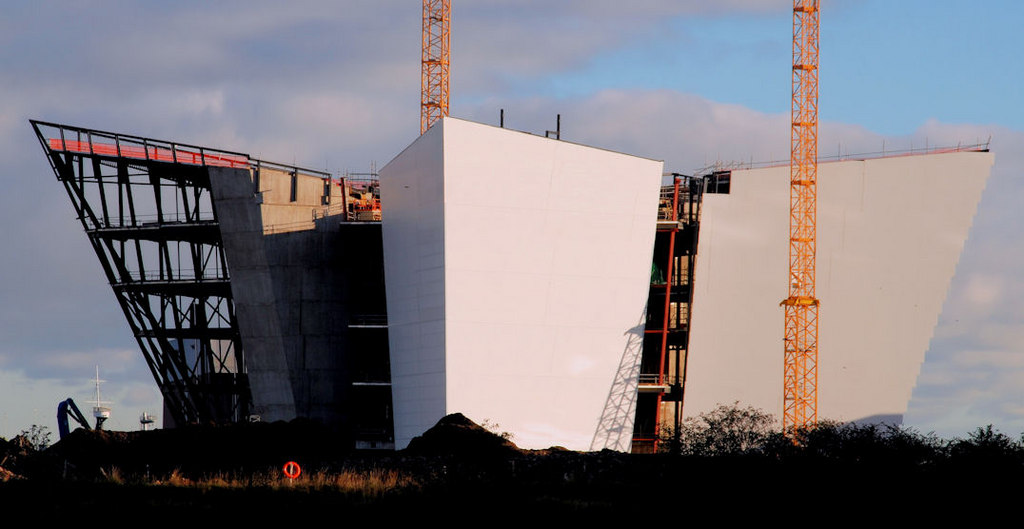
Construction of Titanic Belfast in 2010

Cities have used museums as tools for economic development, especially in postindustrial regions. The Guggenheim Museum Bilbao in Spain is an example. The Basque regional government funded the museum to renew the city's old port area. The government spent about $100 million on construction, which led to protests from local residents. After opening, the museum attracted over 1.1 million visitors in 2015, with 63% coming from outside Spain. This influx of foreign visitors increased local spending and investment, which helped the city's economy and generated tax revenue that exceeded the initial investment.

Titanic Belfast in Northern Ireland followed a similar approach. Built in the city's former shipyards, the attraction cost about the same as the Guggenheim Museum Bilbao. In its first year, Titanic Belfast welcomed over 800,000 visitors, with nearly 60% coming from outside Northern Ireland. Over ten years, the attraction generated an estimated £430 million in direct spending within the region. In the United States, cities have also invested in museums as economic drivers, such as the Taubman Museum of Art in Roanoke, Virginia, and The Broad in Los Angeles. The Broad, for example, generated $54.5 million in total business revenue and supported hundreds of jobs in its first year.

The use of museums as economic engines has caused debate among museum professionals and local communities. Some cities have seen protests when public funds are used for museum projects. Protests often decrease if the museum becomes successful, as in Bilbao. However, if a museum fails to attract enough visitors, criticism can continue. The Taubman Museum of Art is an example where high construction costs and lower-than-expected attendance led to financial difficulties and ongoing concerns about sustainability.

=== Funding ===
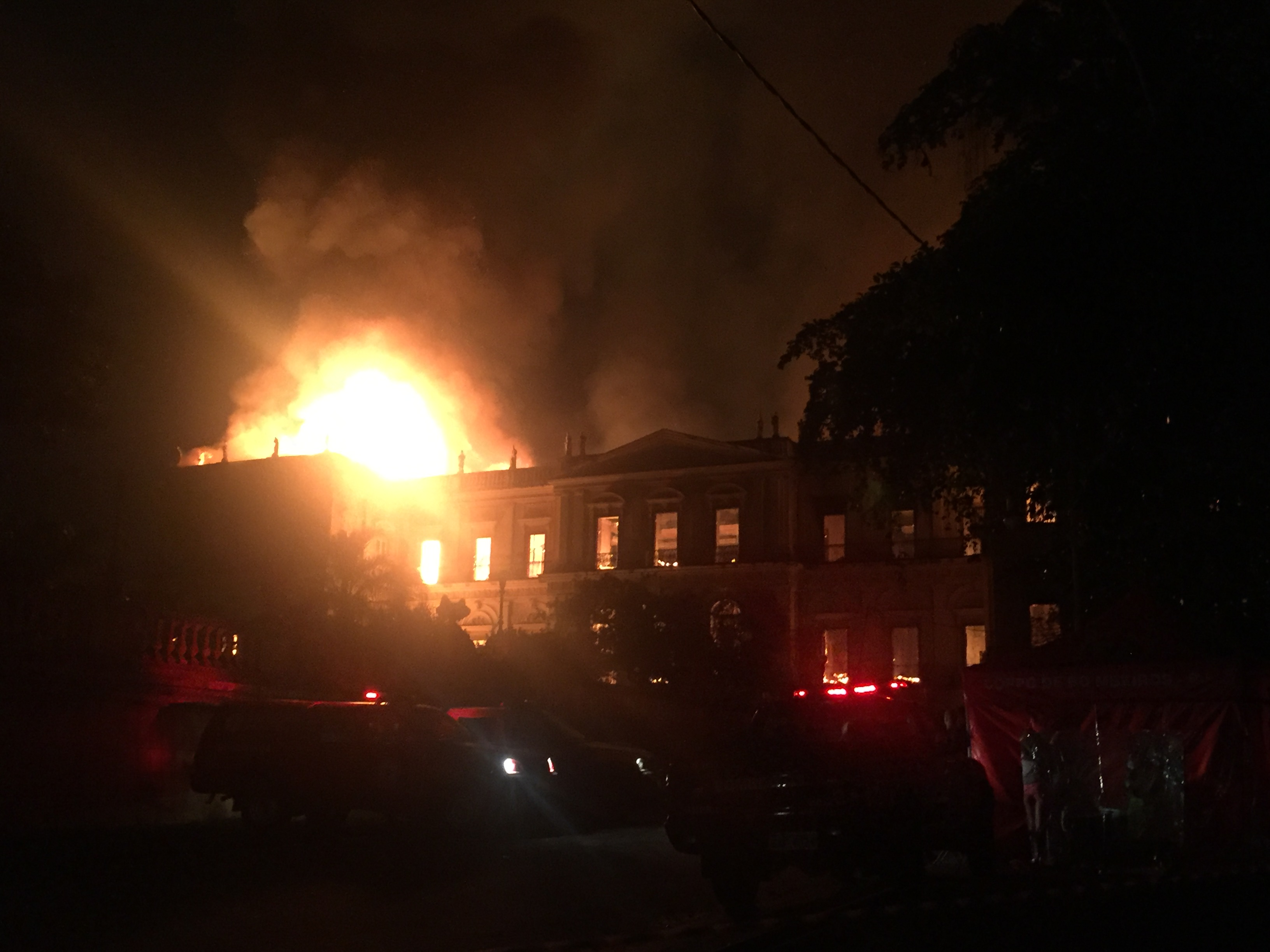
Officials blamed a lack of funding for a 2018 fire at the National Museum of Brazil that destroyed over 90% of its contents.

Museums are facing funding shortages. Funding for museums comes from four major categories, and as of 2009 the breakdown for the United States is as follows: Government support (at all levels) 24.4%, private (charitable) giving 36.5%, earned income 27.6%, and investment income 11.5%. Government funding from the National Endowment for the Arts, the largest museum funder in the United States, decreased by $18.260 million between 2011 and 2015, adjusted for inflation. The average spent per visitor in an art museum in 2016 was $8 between admissions, retail sales and dining, whereas the average expense per visitor was $55. Corporate donations, which come under private giving, can be a good source of funding to make up the funding gap. The amount corporations currently give to museums accounts for just 5% of total funding. However, corporate giving to the arts was projected to increase by 3.3% in 2017.

== Exhibition design ==
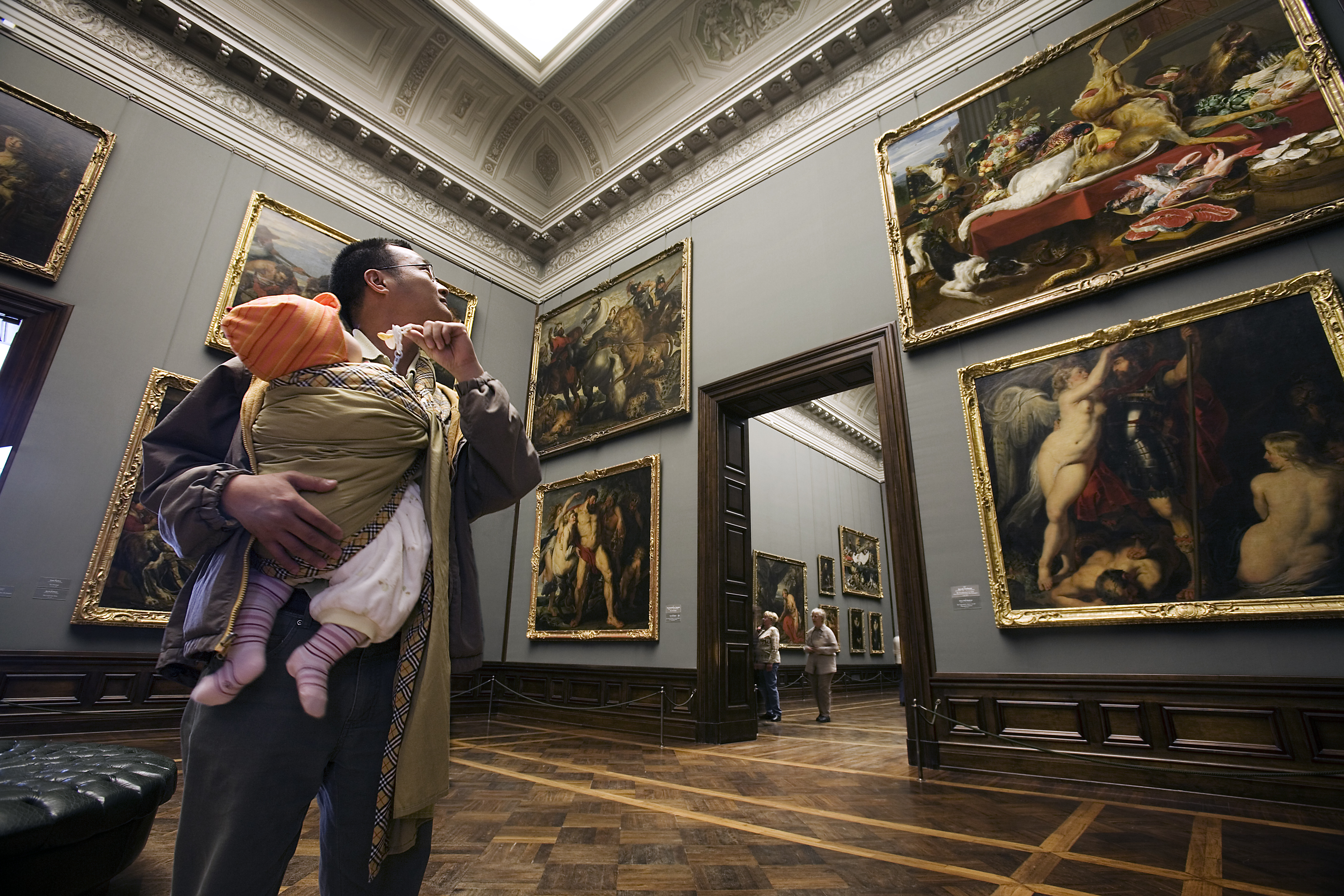
Paintings arranged in groupings in the "salon style"

Most mid-size and large museums employ exhibit design staff for graphic and environmental design projects, including exhibitions. In addition to traditional 2D and 3D designers and architects, these staff departments may include audio-visual specialists, software designers, audience research, evaluation specialists, writers, editors, and preparators or art handlers. These staff specialists may also be charged with supervising contract design or production services. The exhibit design process builds on the interpretive plan for an exhibit, determining the most effective, engaging and appropriate methods of communicating a message or telling a story. The process will often mirror the architectural process or schedule, moving from conceptual plan, through schematic design, design development, contract document, fabrication, and installation. Museums of all sizes may also contract the outside services of exhibit fabrication businesses.

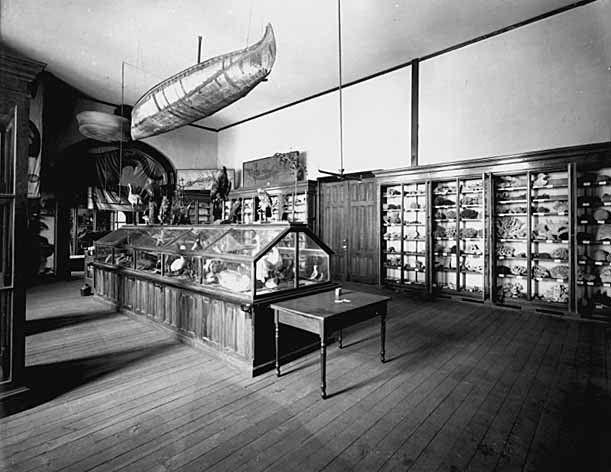
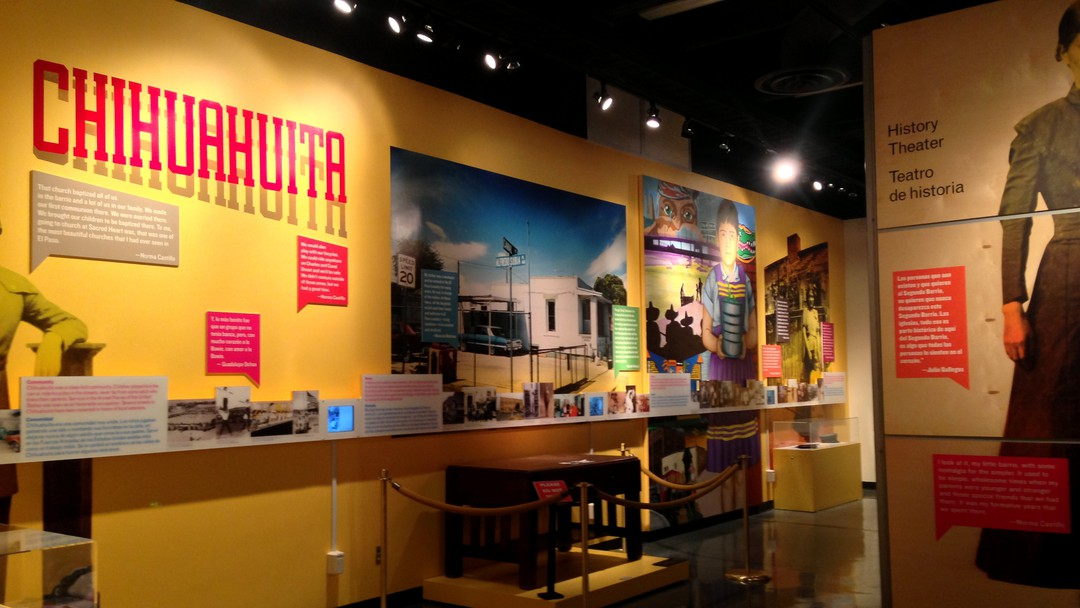
Left: "Cabinet of curiosities" style of exhibit, c. 1890. Right: Contemporary history exhibit, 2016.

Some museum scholars have even begun to question whether museums truly need artifacts at all. Historian Steven Conn provocatively asks this question, suggesting that there are fewer objects in all museums now, as they have been progressively replaced by interactive technology. As educational programming has grown in museums, mass collections of objects have receded in importance. This is not necessarily a negative development; Dorothy Canfield Fisher observed that the reduction in objects has pushed museums to grow from institutions that artlessly showcased their many artifacts (in the style of early cabinets of curiosity) to instead "thinning out" the objects presented "for a general view of any given subject or period, and to put the rest away in archive-storage-rooms, where they could be consulted by students, the only people who really needed to see them". This phenomenon of disappearing objects is especially present in science museums like the Museum of Science and Industry in Chicago, which have a high visitorship of school-aged children who may benefit more from hands-on interactive technology than reading a label beside an artifact.

== Types ==
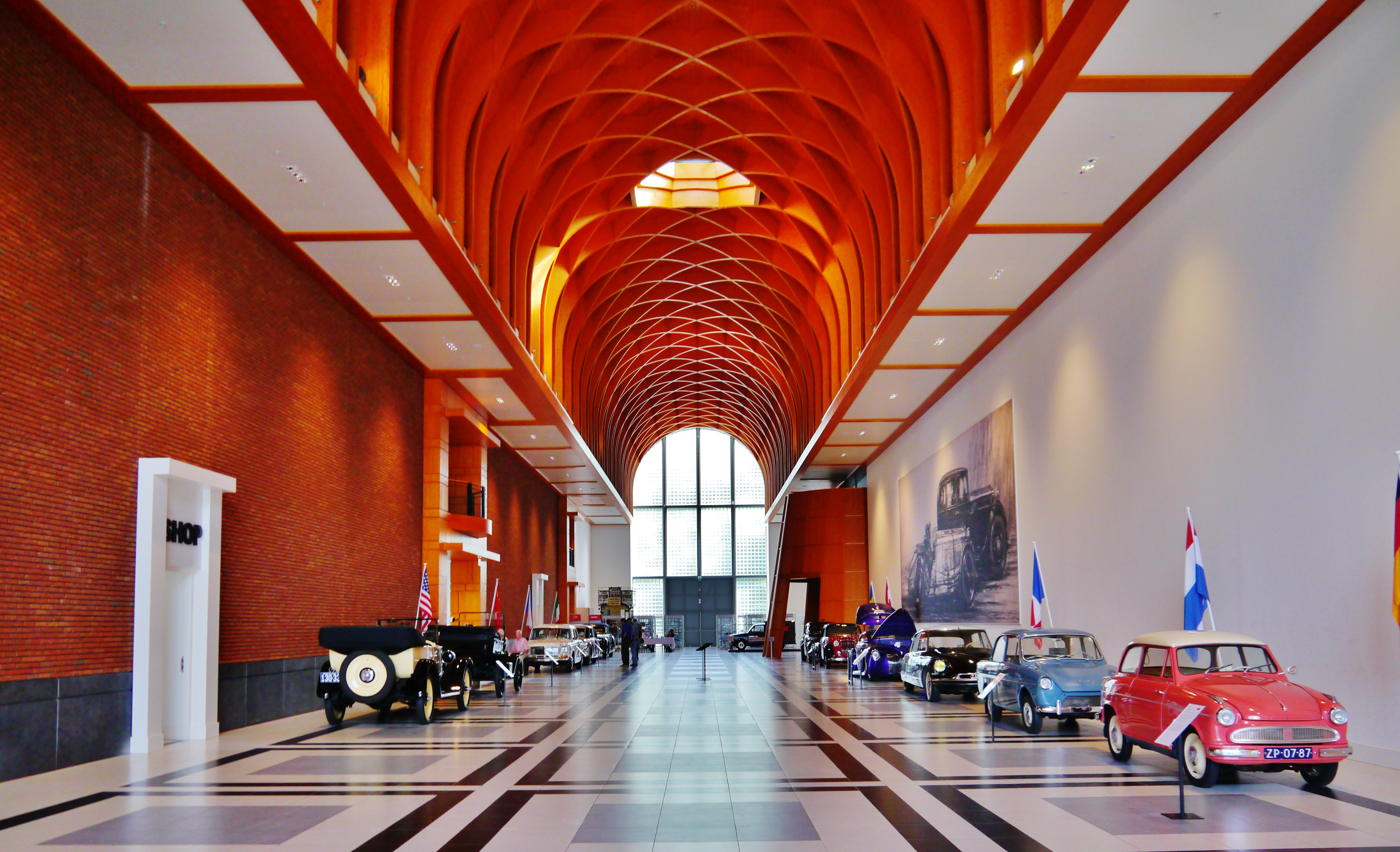
Classic cars displayed at The Hague's automotive museum in The Netherlands, which could be considered both a history and technology museum

Background

There is no definitive standard as to the set types of museums. Additionally, the museum landscape has become so varied, that it may not be sufficient to use traditional categories to comprehend fully the vast variety existing throughout the world. However, it may be useful to categorize museums in different ways under multiple perspectives. Museums can vary based on size, from large institutions, to very small institutions focusing on specific subjects, such as a specific location, a notable person, or a given period of time. Museums also can be based on the main source of funding: central or federal government, provinces, regions, universities; towns and communities; other subsidised; nonsubsidised and private.

It may sometimes be useful to distinguish between diachronic museums which interpret the way its subject matter has developed and evolved through time (e.g., Lower East Side Tenement Museum and Diachronic Museum of Larissa), and synchronic museums which interpret the way its subject matter existed at a certain point in time (e.g., the Anne Frank House and Colonial Williamsburg). According to University of Florida Professor Eric Kilgerman, "While a museum in which a particular narrative unfolds within its halls is diachronic, those museums that limit their space to a single experience are called synchronic."

In her book Civilizing the Museum, author Elaine Heumann Gurian proposes that there are five categories of museums based on intention and not content: object centered, narrative, client centered, community centered, and national.

Museums can also be categorized into major groups by the type of collections they display, to include: fine arts, applied arts, craft, archaeology, anthropology and ethnology, biography, history, cultural history, science, technology, children's museums, natural history, botanical and zoological gardens. Within these categories, many museums specialize further, e.g., museums of modern art, folk art, local history, military history, aviation history, philately, agriculture, or geology. The size of a museum's collection typically determines the museum's size, whereas the nature of its collection reflects the type of museum it is. Many museums normally display a "permanent collection" of important selected objects in its area of specialization, and may periodically display "special collections" on a temporary basis.

=== Major types ===
The following is a list to give an idea of the major museum types. While comprehensive, it is not a definitive list.

- Agricultural
- Architecture
- Archaeological
- Art
- Automotive
- Aviation
- Design
- Biographical
- Children's
- Community
- Encyclopedic
- Folk
- Historic house
- Historic site
- Living history
- Local
- Maritime
- Medical
- Memorial
- Military
- Natural history
- Open-air
- Science
- Virtual

=== Legal framework ===
==== Public vs. private ownership ====
Privately owned museums are organized by individuals and managed by a board and museum officers, while publicly owned museums are created and managed by federal, state, or local governments. A government can charter a museum through legislative action but the museum can still be private as it is not part of the government. The distinction regulates the ownership and legal accountability for the care of the collections.

==== Non-profit vs. for-profit ====
Nonprofit means that an organization is classified as a charitable, educational, scientific, or religious corporation and is exempt from paying most taxes and the money the organization earns is invested in the organization itself. Money made by a private, for-profit museum is paid to the museum's owners or shareholders.

The nonprofit museum has a fiduciary responsibility in regards to the public, in essence the museum holds its collections and administers it for the benefit of the public. Collections of for-profit museums are legally corporate assets the museum administers for the benefit of the owners or shareholders.

==== Management by trusts vs. corporations ====
A trust is a legal instrument where trustees manage the trust's assets for the benefit of the museum following the specific wishes of the donor. This provides tax benefits for the donor, and also allows the donor to have control over how assets are distributed.

Corporations are legal entities and may acquire property in a way similar to how an individual can own property. Museums under incorporation are usually organized by a community or group of individuals. While a board of director's loyalty is to the corporation, a board of trustee's loyalty has to be loyal to the intention of the trust.

== Current challenges ==
=== Decolonization ===
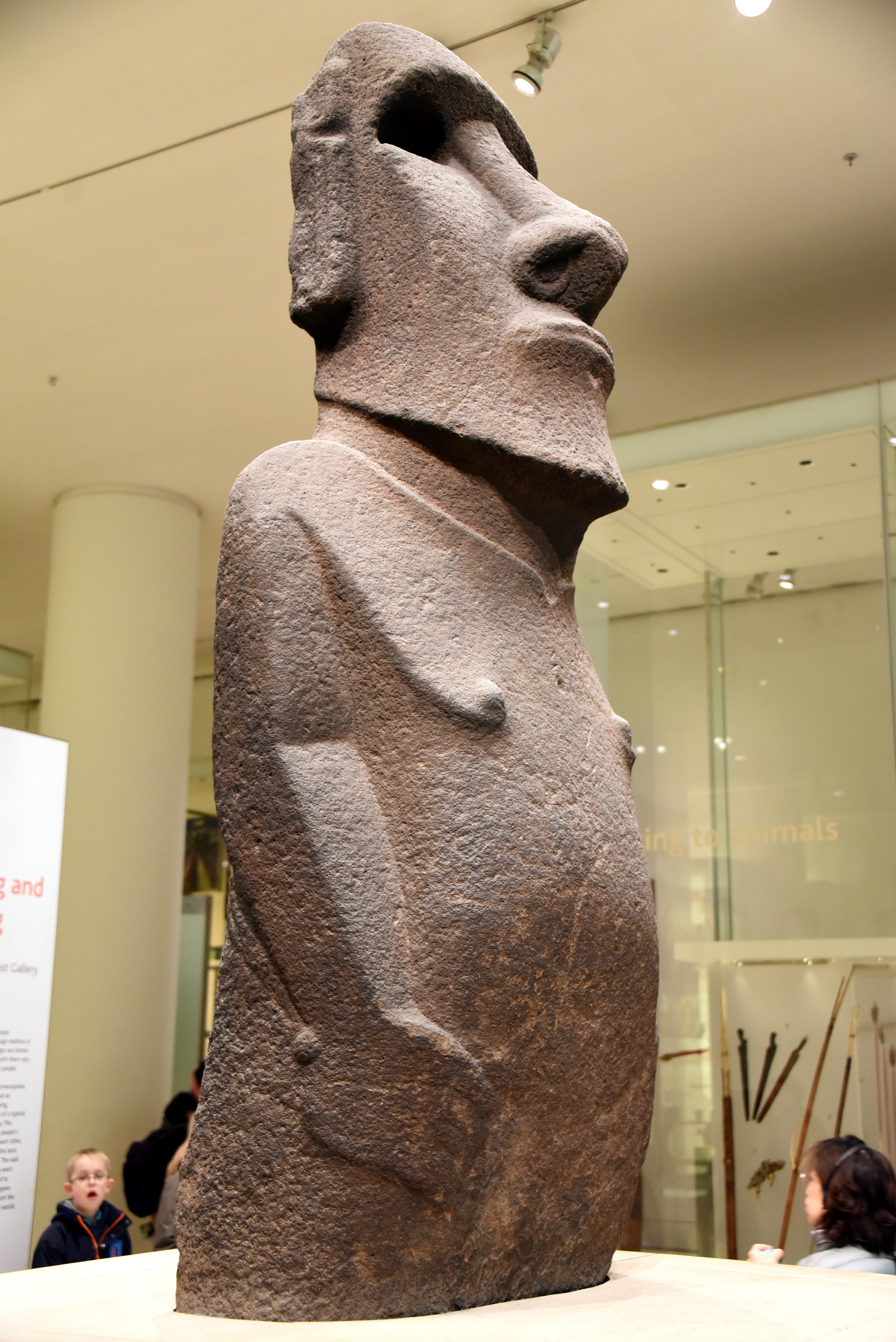
Moai figure at the British Museum.

A global movement for the decolonization of museums has been gaining momentum since the late 20th century. Proponents of this movement argue that "museums are a box of things" and do not represent complete stories; instead they show biased narratives based on ideologies, in which certain stories are intentionally disregarded. Through this, people are encouraging others to consider this missing perspective, when looking at museum collections, as every object viewed in such environments was placed by an individual to represent a certain viewpoint, be it historical or cultural.

The 2018 report on the restitution of African cultural heritage is a prominent example regarding the decolonization of museums and other collections in France and the claims of African countries to regain artifacts illegally taken from their original cultural settings.

Since 1868, several monolithic human figures known as Moai have been removed from Easter Island and put in display in major Western museums such as the National Museum of Natural History, the British Museum, the Louvre and the Royal Museums of Art and History. Several demands have been made by Easter Island residents for the return of the Moai. The figures are seen as ancestors and family or the soul by the Rapa Nui and hold deep cultural value to their people. Other examples include the Gweagal Shield, thought to be a very significant shield taken from Botany Bay in April 1770 or the Parthenon marble sculptures, which were taken from Greece by Lord Elgin in 1805. Successive Greek governments have unsuccessfully petitioned for the return of the Parthenon marbles. Another example among many others is the so-called Montezuma's headdress in the Museum of Ethnology, Vienna, which is a source of dispute between Austria and Mexico.

As well as an argument for the decolonization of museums, there is also the push by some to represent, in both exhibitions and new museums, the marginalized communities within a culture or society. One example of this is the Black Miner's Museum in Nottingham, England.

=== Repatriation of human remains ===
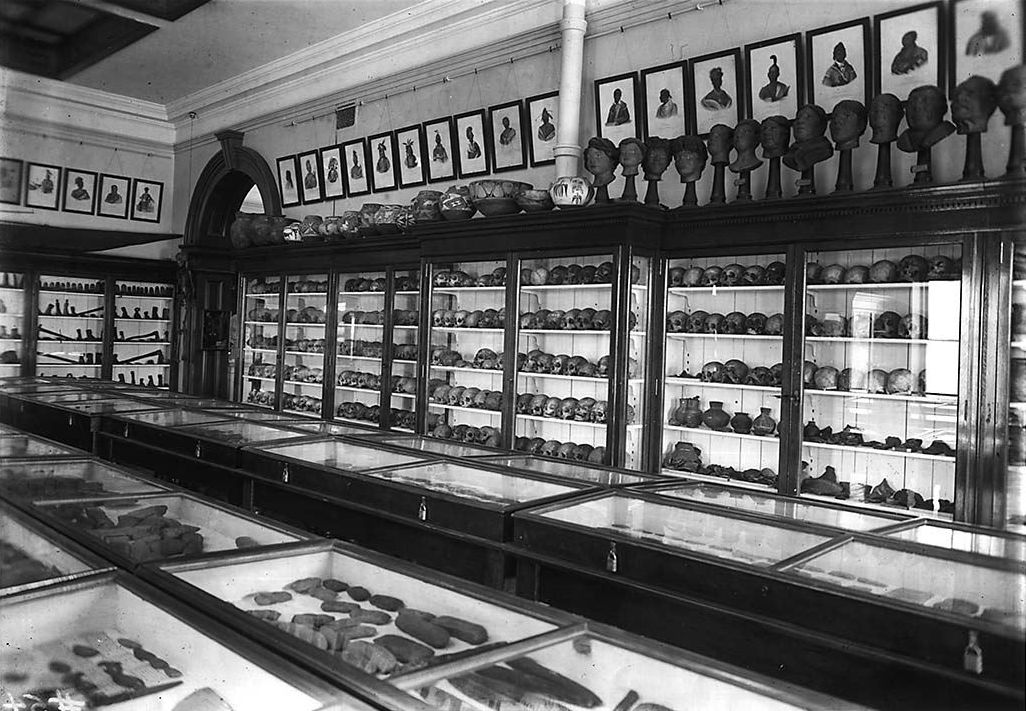
An exhibition of the remains of Native Americans at the Royal Ontario Museum in 1908

In the United States, the repatriation of human remains from museum collections is shaped by the Native American Graves Protection and Repatriation Act (NAGPRA), enacted in 1990. This law requires museums and federal agencies to identify, inventory, and return Native American human remains and associated funerary objects to lineal descendants, tribes, and Native Hawaiian organizations. Recent updates to NAGPRA have introduced stricter timelines and require museums to obtain consent from descendant communities before displaying or researching human remains and cultural items. Many museums have responded by covering displays and increasing consultation with affiliated tribes while reviewing collections for compliance. Despite these efforts, challenges remain, including incomplete inventories, limited resources, and difficulties in establishing cultural affiliation for some remains.

In Europe, repatriation of human remains also reflects changing ethical standards and public attitudes, but the process is shaped by a patchwork of national laws, institutional policies, and international agreements. In the United Kingdom, the Human Tissue Act 2004 allows national museums to return human remains under certain conditions, and several institutions have repatriated remains to Indigenous communities, including those in Australia. In Germany and France, museums follow guidelines that encourage transparency, consultation, and case-by-case assessment of repatriation requests, especially for remains acquired in colonial contexts. Some institutions emphasize the scientific value of retaining remains, while others prioritize engagement with source communities and cultural restitution. The process remains complex, involving legal, political, and ethical considerations, but there is growing pressure from the public and governments for museums to address colonial legacies and return human remains to descendant communities.

=== Labor issues and unionization ===
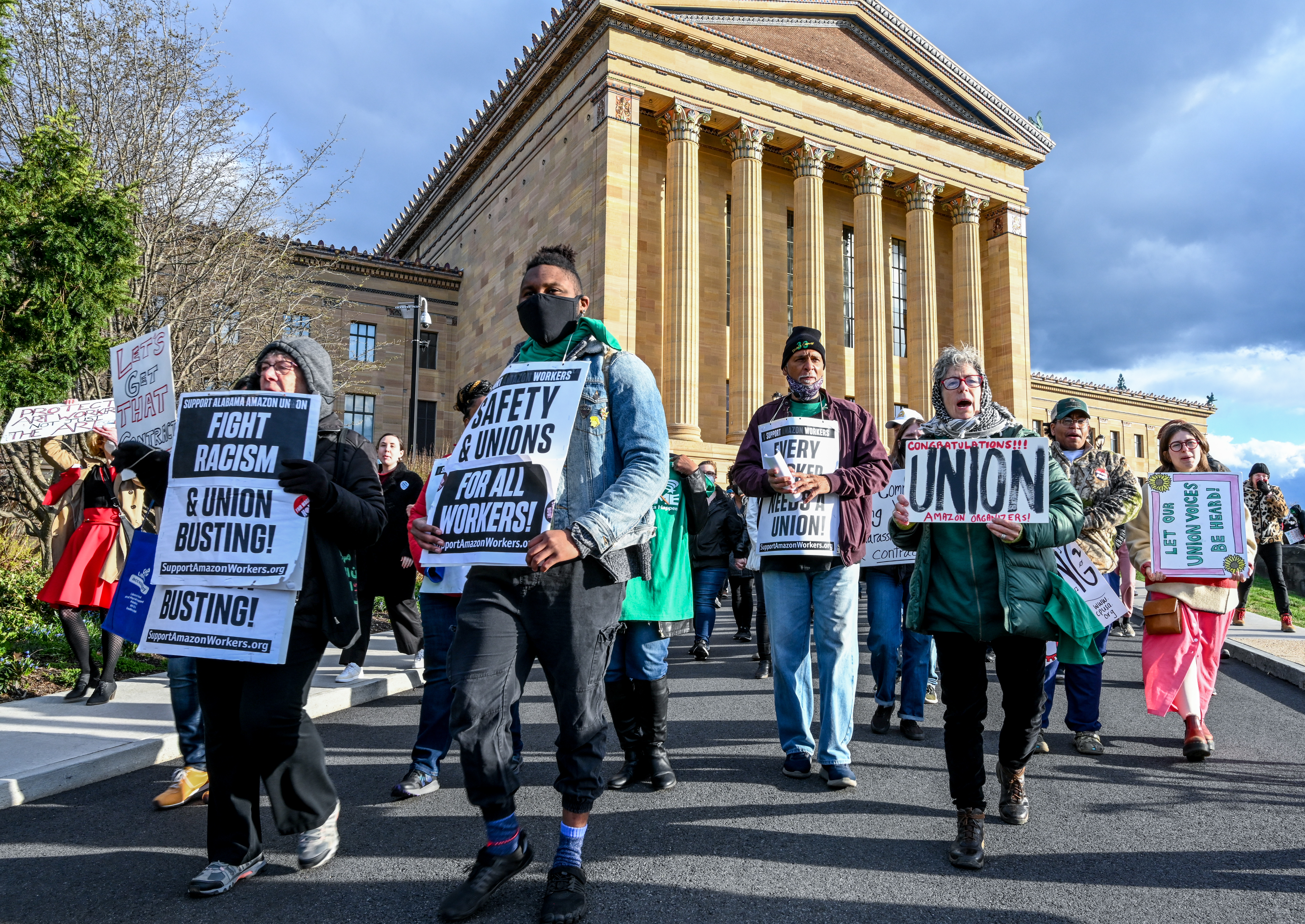
Workers rallying at the Philadelphia Museum of Art.

Background

In the United States, union membership among museum workers has grown, with over 15,000 museum employees now represented by unions at more than 50 art museums. The unionization wave has included institutions such as the Philadelphia Museum of Art, the Whitney Museum, and the Guggenheim Museum, among others. These efforts reflect a broader movement to address labor issues and promote fair treatment across the museum field. In 2019 the workers in multiple museums voted to form unions with more protesting to press for a fair contract and against unfair labor practices. During that year over 3,000 cultural workers anonymously started to share their salaries online through a pay transparency spreadsheet.

History

In the United States, labor unrest within the arts and cultural sector go back at least nearly a century to 1933 when a New York-based collective of artists eventually known as the Artist's Union used collective bargaining for state relief for unemployed artists.

In 1971 administrative staff at New York's Museum of Modern Art formed the organization "Professional and Staff Association of the Museum of Modern Art" (PASTA), the first union of professional employees, as opposed to maintenance and service people, at a privately‐financed museum. The contract negotiated would provide a wage increase, protection against termination without cause, and direct access to trustees and policy-making processes at the museum. While there was some interest from workers at other museums at the time, for the next fifty years there was little change in museums adding union representation of their professional employees.

Unionization Process at Museums

Museum workers typically begin by discussing shared concerns and organizing informally. They may then partner with established unions or form independent units. The process involves seeking recognition from museum management, which may require a formal election. Once recognized, the union negotiates a collective bargaining agreement covering wages, benefits, and working conditions.

Recent union campaigns have often sought "wall-to-wall" representation, which includes workers from multiple departments under a single contract. This approach contrasts with earlier models that organized workers by occupation.

=== Union actions ===
Strikes and picketing

Museum workers have engaged in strikes and picketing to address disputes over wages and working conditions. At the Seattle Art Museum, security guards went on strike for 11 days in December 2024, which led to their first contract and wage increases. At the Massachusetts Museum of Contemporary Art (MASS MoCA), unionized staff held a three-week strike in March 2024, resulting in a new contract with higher minimum wages, increased base pay, and improved overtime and holiday pay. In the United Kingdom, security guards at the Natural History Museum, Science Museum, and Victoria & Albert Museum organized a coordinated strike and picketing in December 2024, seeking higher pay, sick leave from the first day of employment, and additional annual leave.

Protests and public demonstrations

Museum unions have also used public demonstrations to draw attention to layoffs and contract disputes. In February 2025, Brooklyn Museum workers from UAW Local 2110 and Local 1502 of District Council 37 rallied outside the museum to protest the planned termination of 47 employees. The unions argued that management did not consult them before announcing layoffs and that the plan violated union contracts. The demonstration included speeches from local politicians and support from workers at other museums, with union leaders calling for alternative solutions, such as furloughs, instead of staff reductions.

Union formation

Union formation at museums has seen both successes and challenges. The Marciano Art Foundation, a museum established by co-founders of Guess clothing, Maurice Marciano and Paul Marciano closed indefinitely in November 2019 after workers attempted to unionize. The Marciano Foundation released a statement a month later that the closure was permanent. In the country of Georgia 40 employees were fired May 2022 as part of a restructuring. The newly formed union, the Georgian Trade Union of Science, Education, and Culture Workers said in a statement they said the employees were fired illegally and the reorganization was "carried out by the employer in an untransparent and maladministered manner" and that the organization will "definitely fight to the end to protect the rights of employees." Fired senior curator Maia Pataridze said the new management mentioned her social media posts criticizing the government. Among those fired was union chair, Nikoloz Tsikaridze, a senior researcher and archaeologist who associated the discharging of himself and other museum staff was for forming a union, and said that Thea Tsulukiani, the Georgia Minister of Culture had "punished" them.

MASS MoCA workers formed their union in April 2021 and secured a contract after a prolonged strike in 2024. Security guards at the Seattle Art Museum formed an independent union in 2021 and achieved a contract following their strike in 2024. However, union efforts often face resistance from management, and disputes over layoffs and contract terms continue to present challenges for museum unions. In 2025 Science Museum of Minnesota workers formed a wall-to-wall union in 2023 and ratified their first contract.

=== Sustainability and climate change ===
Increasingly museums have responded to the ongoing climate crisis through enacting sustainable museum practices, and exhibitions highlighting the issues surrounding climate change and the Anthropocene.

A study found that climate control for museum collections contributes significantly to museum's carbon footprint, and in some cases can contribute up to 70% of its energy consumption.

=== Digital culture ===
As digital culture has increased in society, museums have needed to respond to these changes in the facilities that they offer online.

== See also ==
- Audio tour
- Category:Types of museums
- Cell phone tour
- Computer Interchange of Museum Information
- International Museum Day (18 May)
- List of largest art museums
- List of most visited art museums
- List of most-visited museums by region
- Lists of museums
- .museum
- Museum education
- Museum fatigue
- Museum label
- Museum shop
- Science tourism
- Virtual Library museums pages
