= Cary Karp =

Museum curator

Cary Karp (born 3 April 1947), a retired museum curator based in Sweden, has been instrumental in developing online facilities for museums in the context of the International Council of Museums (ICOM). In particular, he was central in promoting and establishing the .museum top-level domain as President of the international Museum Domain Management Association (MuseDoma). He has also been a principal contributor to establishment of standards for registration of internationalized domain names.

== Background ==
Karp has a PhD in musicology and is Associate Professor of Organology at Uppsala University in Sweden. He has been professionally involved with museums since the late 1960s. He was curator of the musical instrument collections at the Music Museum in Stockholm from 1973 to 1990, especially concerned with conservation, and rose to be the museum's Deputy Director during the 1980s. He was at the Swedish Museum of Natural History 1990 until his retirement in 2014, first as Director of the Department of Information Technology and then as Director of Internet Strategy and Technology.

== Contribution to museums and IT ==
Cary Karp has been the Director of Internet Strategy for ICOM. Within the context of IT development for museums internationally, he has been:

- President of the Museum Domain Management Association (MuseDoma),
- Chair of the ICOM Advisory Committee Internet Working Group,
- Computer Interchange of Museum Information (CIMI) Project Manager,
- a member of the Board of ICOM's International Documentation Committee (CIDOC) and Chair of the CIDOC Internet Working Group,
- an at-large member of the Internet Corporation for Assigned Names and Numbers (ICANN),
- a member of the editorial board of the international journal Archives and Museum Informatics.
