= Museum Domain Management Association =

Sponsoring organization for the .museum domain

The Museum Domain Management Association (MuseDoma) was created in 2000 by the International Council of Museums (ICOM) and the J. Paul Getty Trust. MuseDoma is the sponsoring organization for the .museum top-level domain.

== History ==
MuseDoma was created in 2000 as a non-profit trade association based in Delaware.

In October 2001, the ICANN and the Museum Domain Management Association launched the ICANN's first ever sponsored top-level domain, .museum. The new top-level domain was reserved to official museums worldwide. Upon the launch of the tld, the J. Paul Getty Trust was a member of MuseDoma's board.

At the very beginning, the name Museum Domain Management Association was shortened to its initials, MDMA, until the management team was advised to change it since it was exactly the same initials as the homonymous drug (MDMA).

== Description ==
The .museum top-level domain is not available for all museums, a list of conditions (non-profit, permanent activity, ...) must be met. Many virtual museums cannot apply for a .museum domain name.

== See also ==
- Cary Karp
- .museum
