= .museum =

Internet top-level domain

museum
- Introduced: 2001
- TLD type: Sponsored top-level domain
- Status: Active
- Registry: Museum Domain Management Association
- Sponsor: Museum Domain Management Association (set up by International Council of Museums)
- Intended use: Museums
- Actual use: Museums (though few use it as their primary advertised address)
- Registration restrictions: Credentials of applicants are checked before registration is permitted
- Structure: Registrations originally had to be at third or higher level beneath generic category, but later direct second-level registrations were allowed
- Documents: ICANN registry agreement
- Dispute policies: UDRP, Charter Eligibility Dispute Resolution Procedure (CEDRP)
- DNSSEC: yes
- Registry website: welcome.museum

.museum is a sponsored top-level domain (sTLD) in the Domain Name System of the Internet used exclusively by museums, museum associations, and individual members of the museum profession, as these groups are defined by the International Council of Museums (ICOM).

In joint action with the J. Paul Getty Trust, ICOM established the Museum Domain Management Association (MuseDoma), headed by Cary Karp, for the purpose of submitting an application to ICANN for the creation of the new generic top-level domain (gTLD), and to operate a registry. The .museum domain was entered into the DNS root on 20 October 2001, and was the first sponsored top-level domain to be instituted through ICANN's action.

The purpose of this domain is to reserve a segment of the DNS name space reserved for the use of museums; a name space whose conventions are defined by the museum community. The .museum TLD grants users a quick and intuitive way to verify the authenticity of a museum site. Conversely, since it is a type of formal third-party certification, museums using this name space obtain a way to assure visitors of the site's validity.

One of the initial ideas with the .museum tld was to create a network of official museum websites, and operate a central indexing tool to make all of their hosted content searchable, discoverable.

In addition to the eligibility requirements specified in the .museum charter, naming conventions apply to the labeling of subdomains. Extensive support is also being introduced for internationalized domain names, as described at welcome.museum.

Registrations are processed via accredited registrars.

== See also ==
- Museum Domain Management Association
