= Computer Interchange of Museum Information =

The Consortium for Computer Interchange of Museum Information (CIMI) was an initiative for museum IT standards under the auspices of the Coalition for Networked Information (CNI).

The CIMI project was started in 1990 by the US-based Museum Computer Network (MCN) and operated as a committee of MCN. It aimed to develop a standards framework to help museums in exchanging data and providing standard databases. This was published in MCN's Spectra.

CIMI's project managers included Cary Karp and John Perkins.
