= Digital Technologies and the Museum Experience =

2008 book

Digital Technologies and the Museum Experience: Handheld Guides and Other Media
- Editor: Loïc Tallon and Kevin Walker
- Language: English
- Subject: Museums, museum informatics, digital technology
- Genre: Non-fiction
- Publisher: AltaMira Press, Rowman & Littlefield Publishers
- Publication date: 2008
- Publication place: United Kingdom
- Media type: Print (cloth & paperback), electronic
- Pages: xxv+238
- ISBN: 978-0-7591-1119-6

Digital Technologies and the Museum Experience (2008), edited by Loïc Tallon and Kevin Walker, is a book about the use of digital technology by museums.

== Overview ==
The book is divided into 11 contributed chapters by a variety of authors, in two parts, Defining the Context: Three Perspectives and Delivering Potential. The book includes a foreword by James M. Bradburne and an introduction by Loïc Tallon. There is also a bibliography, index, and short biographies of contributors. The book is available in cloth (ISBN 978-0-7591-1119-6), paperback (ISBN 978-0-7591-1121-9), and electronic versions (ISBN 978-0-7591-1237-7).

== Contributors ==
The following authors contributed to chapters in the book:

- Jonathan P. Bowen
- Alexandra Burch
- Lynn D. Dierking
- John H. Falk
- Silvia Filippini-Fantoni
- Ben Gammon
- Ellen Giusti
- Halina Gottlieb
- Sherry Hsi
- Peter Lonsdale
- Julia Meek
- Ross Parry
- Peter Samis
- Mike Sharples
- Jeffrey K. Smith
- Pablo P. L. Tinio
- Giasemi Vavoula
- Kevin Walker

== Reviews ==
The book has been reviewed in several journals, including:

- Educational Technology.
- International Journal of Heritage Studies.
- Library Hi Tech.
- MedieKultur: Journal of Media and Communication Research.
- Science Education.
- Visitor Studies.

== See also ==
- Museums and Digital Culture: New Perspectives and Research (2019)
