= Museum informatics =

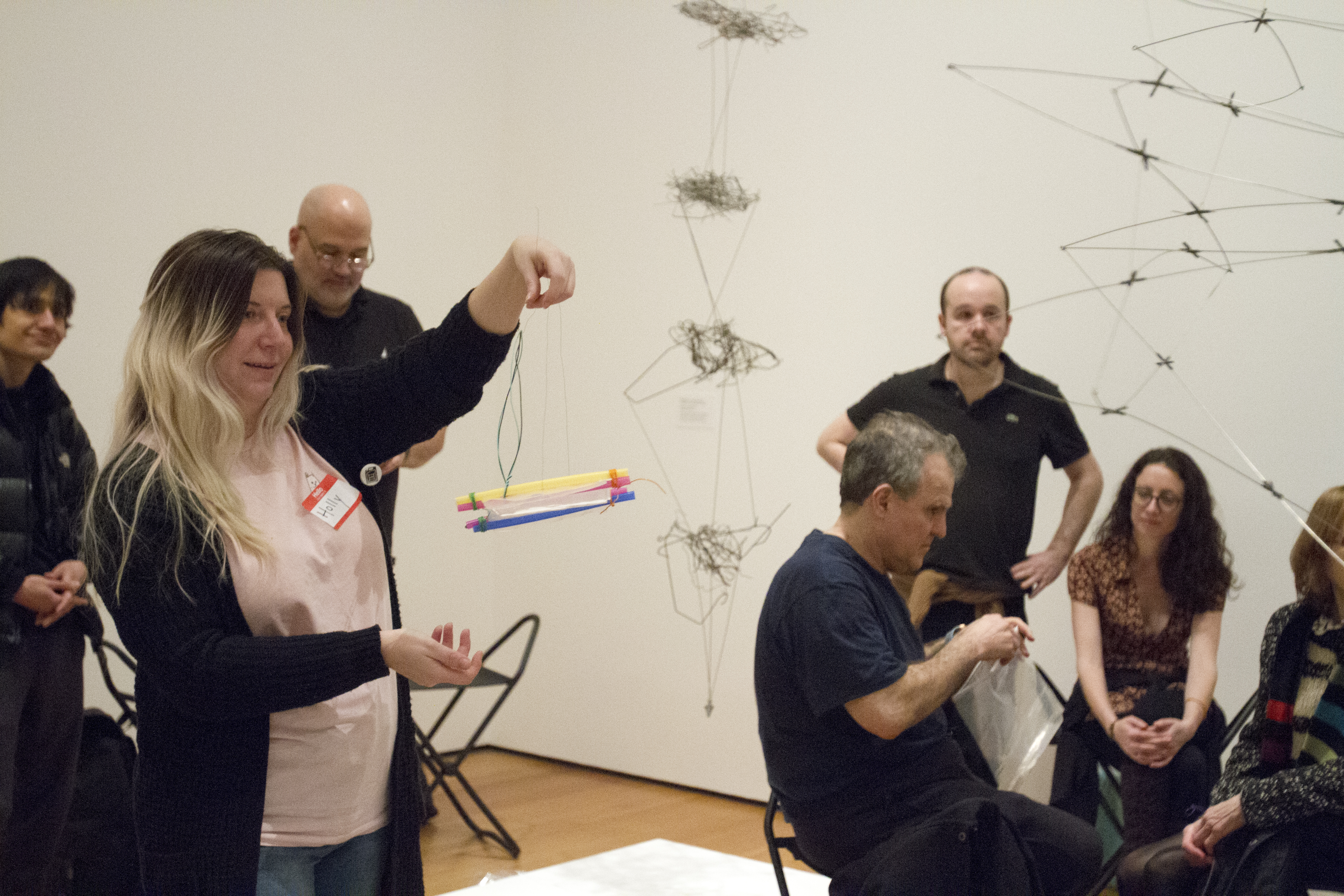
The Museum of Modern Art-Kerry Downey Gallery Session

Museum informatics is an interdisciplinary field of study that refers to the theory and application of informatics by museums. It represents a convergence of culture, digital technology, and information science. In the context of the digital age facilitating growing commonalities across museums, libraries and archives, its place in academe has grown substantially and also has connections with digital humanities.

In all ages, museums are responsible for obtaining, storing, and exhibiting objects of different kinds of objects from art, cultural heritage, natural history, science, to technological inventions. However, modern museums are not only repositories of objects; they are repositories of knowledge. They are more like an information service organization, store information and share knowledge.

After years of studies, the museum professionals and visitors have found their understanding of roles museums play largely changed by the introduction of new information technologies in museums. Today's visitors to museums expect instant access to a large amount of information about every object in the museum's collections.

As the needs and expectations change, the users of museum information resources are galvanizing museums to make appropriate changes. Besides, museum researchers and professionals have begun to explore the impact of information science and technology on the people who use museum resources.

== Overview ==
Museum informatics is an emerging field of academic study focused on the intersection between information technologies, museums and their staff members, and online museum data and services. The more general cultural informatics deals with, for example, information design and interaction, digital curation, cultural heritage description and access, social media, and the application of digital tools. Museums have embraced the application of museum informatics, which has been supported by US federal grants and in particular, by the Institute of Museum and Library Services (IMLS). The older term "museum studies" refers more to traditional curatorial perspectives rather than relating to the use of information science and information technology.

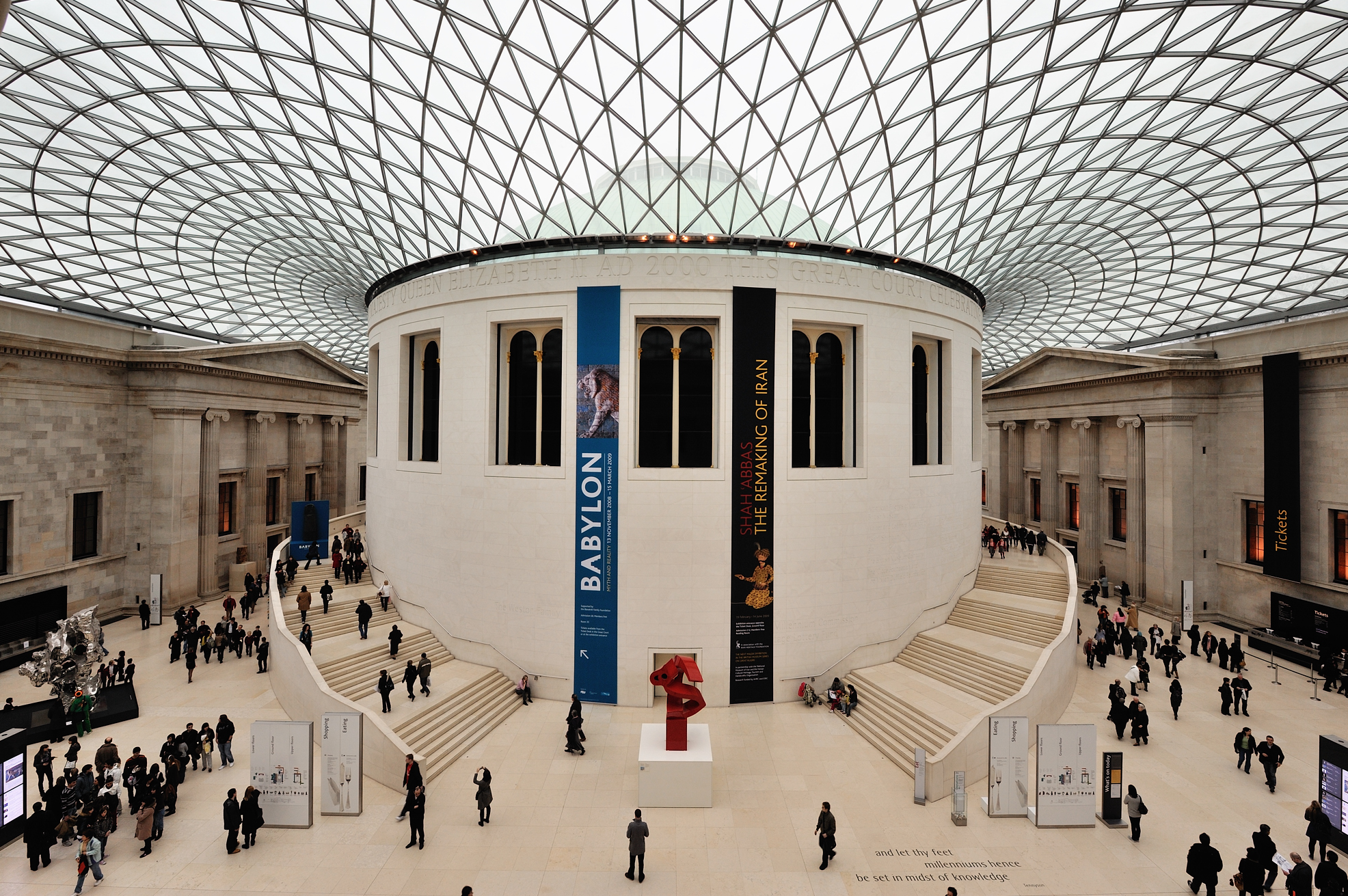
British Museum Dome

Archives and Museum Informatics is a leading journal in the field of museum informatics. University courses relating to museology include a component on museum informatics. The Museum Computer Network (MCN) in the United States holds an annual conference and runs the MCN-L electronic mailing list. The Museums Computer Group (MCG) in the United Kingdom also holds meetings relevant to museum informatics. The ICHIM conference series in Europe and the Museums and the Web conference series in North America cover aspects of museum informatics. Other relevant conferences include the EVA Conferences. Books are available on the subject.

There have been a number of collaborative projects in the field of museum informatics such as The Art Museum Image Consortium (AMICO), Artstor, the Museum Informatics Project (MIP), and steve.museum. The International Council of Museums (ICOM), through Cary Karp, was instrumental in initiating the ".museum" top-level domain for museums on the Internet. Companies such as Archives & Museum Informatics in Canada and Cogapp in the United Kingdom help museums in using information technology effectively.

== History ==
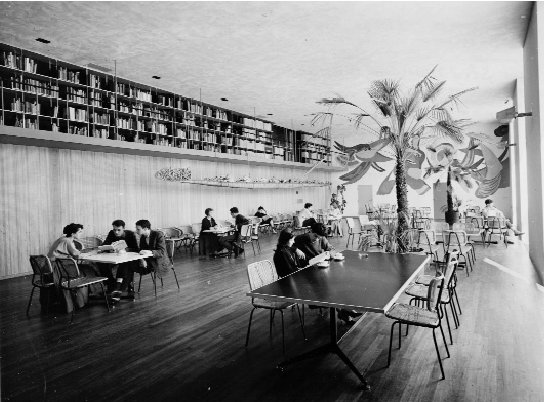
Tuinzaal van het Stedelijk Museum in Amsterdam, 1960

The earliest references to museum informatics in English are from Archives and Museum Informatics a newsletter and journal published on the subject from 1987 to 1996. In the early 1990s, museum informatics projects and services developed at numerous American universities. Cultural informatics was introduced into library and information science education in 2000 at the Pratt Institute School of Library and Information Science in New York. Graduate classes on the topic of museum informatics were offered at the University of Illinois starting in Fall 2001, and at Florida State University starting in Spring 2003. Ph.D. theses were using "museum informatics" in the title by 2002 and 2004. A comprehensive literature review of museum informatics was published in 2005 by Paul F. Marty, W. Boyd Rayward, and Michael B. Twidale, and in 2007, an academic reader, Museum Informatics: People, Information, and Technology in Museums, edited by Paul F. Marty and Katherine Burton Jones, was published as part of the Routledge Studies in Library and Information Science.

For the past few decades, we have witnessed unprecedented changes with respect to the use of museum information resources. The changes have resulted in new levels of information sharing, accessing and new forms of interactions between museum professionals and visitors. These changes have manifested most clearly in the relationships between museums, museum websites, and museum visitors.

Museums are at a turning point, as a ‘technology-driven mutation’ in the evolution of ‘cultural heritage institutions’ is going to redefine the domain and blur boundaries for museum institutions. The future of museums is beginning to be shaped by computer scientists who are serving the museum missions in the recent tradition of museum operation. The introduction of new information resources and technologies in museums has changed the understanding of the role of museums for museum visitors.

== Resources ==
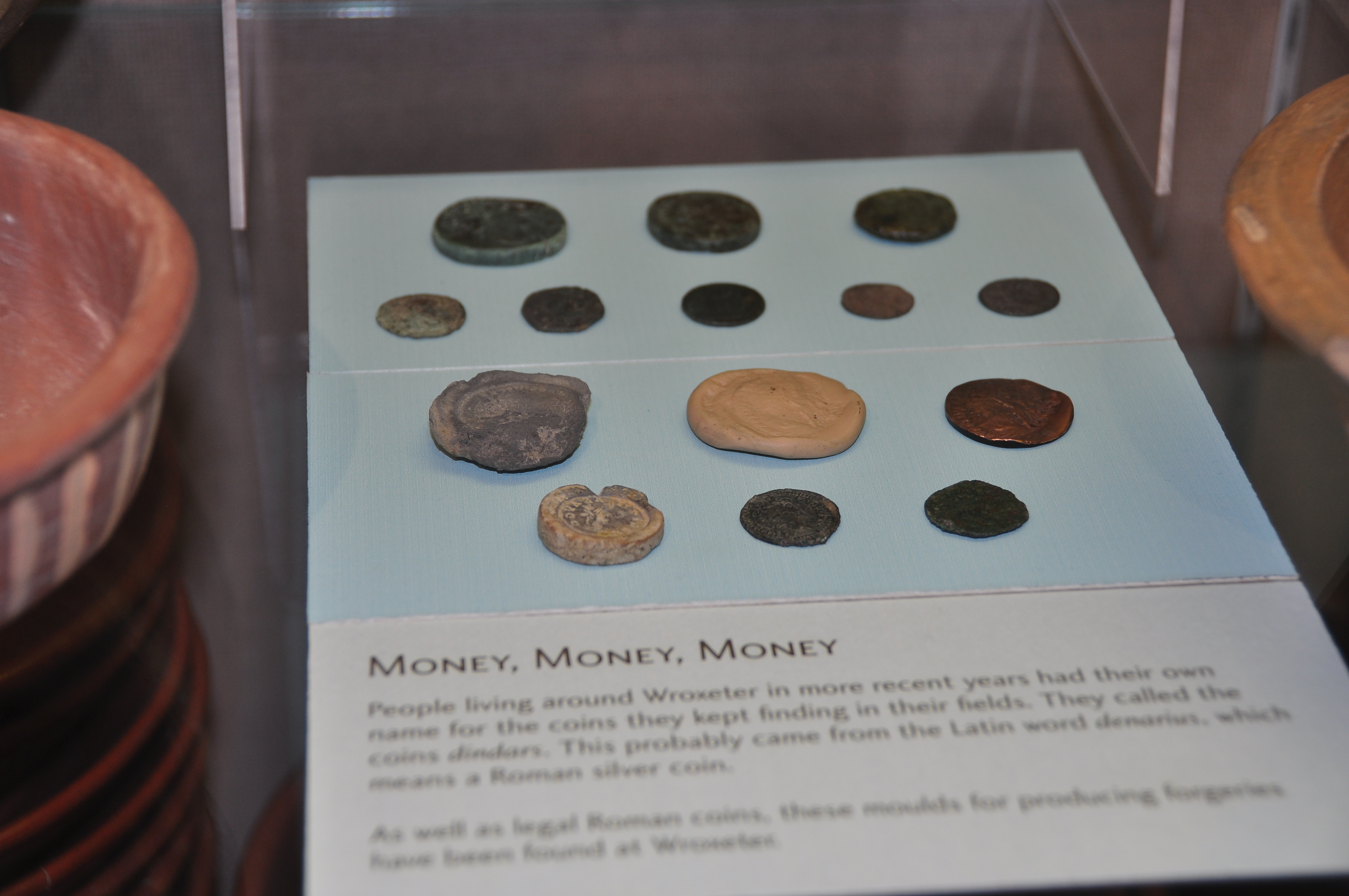
Artifacts with the information representation

To get a better understanding of informatics in museums, we need to consider the various resources which museums need. Among the many types of information resources that are crucial to museums, the most important information one that any museum possesses is its collection of artifacts.

The extensive information that museum professionals possess about the objects is of equal importance compare to the artifacts themselves. For example, when a museum acquires a new collection of exhibits, information about each object will be expertly recorded and sorted by Museum professionals. These museum professionals also need to record specific data about each object such as nomenclature classifications, physical dimensions, material analyses, designations, artifact histories, scholarly remarks, research notes, etc. Except for that, they are responsible for maintaining related information resources such as donor files, accession records, exhibit histories, research studies, temporary loan records, visitor attendance reports, information requests, etc.

For many years, museum professionals have used a wide range of tools, such as ledgers, card catalogs, computer databases, and digital management systems to organize and provide sufficient access to information in museums. Access to a detailed information representation can meet the needs of many users, including researchers, scholars, teachers, students, and the general public, as there is no information representation that can duplicate the physical artifact entirety. To effectively meet the needs of the museum's users, information must be appropriately organized and easy to access.

== Organization and access ==
Before the 1960s, for most museums, information resources about artifacts were mostly organized into paper records and card files. For this kind of paper-based system, there were many drawbacks, such as in terms of information access: only a limited number of individuals could access the files at any time, and the entrance was restricted to only a few data points.

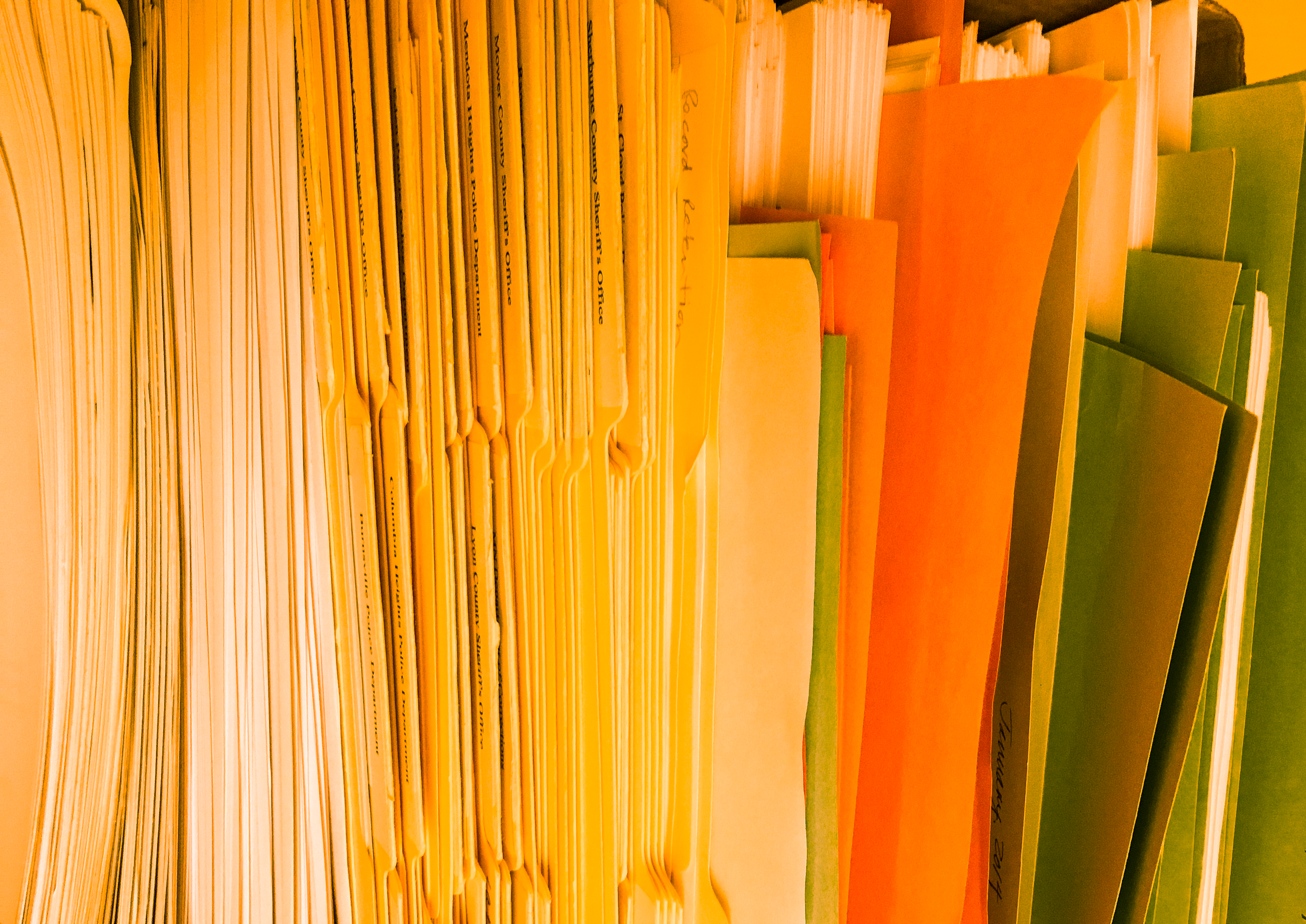
File folders to collect information

This situation can be improved mainly by the introduction of computerized systems for museum cataloging. There were many attempts to create data content, structure, and value standards for documenting and describing museum artifacts. For example, cultural heritage institutions, frequently classify collections of manmade objects using a nomenclature system developed in 1978 by Robert G. Chenhall, which were later revised and expanded by James Blackaby et al.

Using modern organization systems, museum professionals are now able to search and sort digital records about their collections using multiple database field. These systems increase the amount of information about their artifacts and improve data sharing with other institutions.

== Technology ==
In the early 1960s, the first attempts to computerize museum collections happened when museums professionals began exploring the potential benefits of automating collections management with different computerized systems. These early systems were used to store the descriptive information for artifacts in museums. Soon after that, a lot of institutions started to use mainframe systems to store data in electronic format. Nowadays, as the use of the Internet became more widespread than before, museum professionals found more ways to share data about the collections.

=== Digital museums and digitization ===
New technologies and online museums mean easier access and wider use of information resources that may previously have been more firmly controlled by the governing institution.

There are some concerns among museum professionals who worry that when museums digitize their collections and let digital resources available online, they lose control over the museum's intellectual property and other copyrighted materials. In order to protect their intellectual property, some institutions restrict access to certain types of data or make the content they control difficult to reproduce.

Another kind of concern about the digital museum is whether visitors will stop visiting physical museums, as more information about museum collections is available online. Since many museums offer extremely high-resolution images and some even three-dimensional representations of their artifacts online, museum professionals wonder whether museum visitors will still bother to visit the real thing.

Fortunately for museum professionals, recent surveys have provided compelling evidence that online museums actually drive physical museum attendance instead of discouraging physical visits. Despite the potential challenges, museum professionals remain their passion for digitizing their collections, prompted no doubt by the growing number of museum visitors who now expect museums to provide access to their collections in digital formats.

Museum professionals use new information technologies to develop innovative ways of reaching their visitors, online and in-door. As the technologies required to build a digital collection become more comfortable to use and easier to acquire, more museums now have the opportunity to embark upon digitization programs, and arise for museum visitors to get in touch with digital museum collections.

== Interactions ==
New information technologies have changed how museum professionals achieve their missions, and encouraged museum visitors to embrace the new capabilities of the digital museum. Inside the museum, interactions encourage visitors to explore topics in greater depth and at their own pace. Online, virtual museums allow visitors to plan gallery tours, research artifact collections, and learn from interactive educational exhibits.

=== Online interactions ===
Increased access to the digital information resources of libraries, archives, and museums has driven changing expectations from all museum users, including museum visitors and museum professionals, about the information resources museums should provide online and in-house.

In the 1990s, museum professionals began to explore the capabilities of online exhibits, realizing that increased access to digital collections offered new opportunities for interacting with museum collections and information resources. They found that online museums and virtual exhibits have the potential to cover topics in ways not only in physical museums. For example, Douma and Henchman (2000) present an online exhibit that allows visitors to digitally remove layers of a painting, examining earlier versions using simulated infrared or x-ray lenses.

New technologies have also offered the museum professionals ways to bring information about their collections directly to their audiences, to make their records available online to the general public. These resources are used by a wide variety of online visitors, from recent visitors interested in learning more about artifacts, to academic researchers at distant universities searching for particularly artifacts.

=== Personalization in museum experiences ===
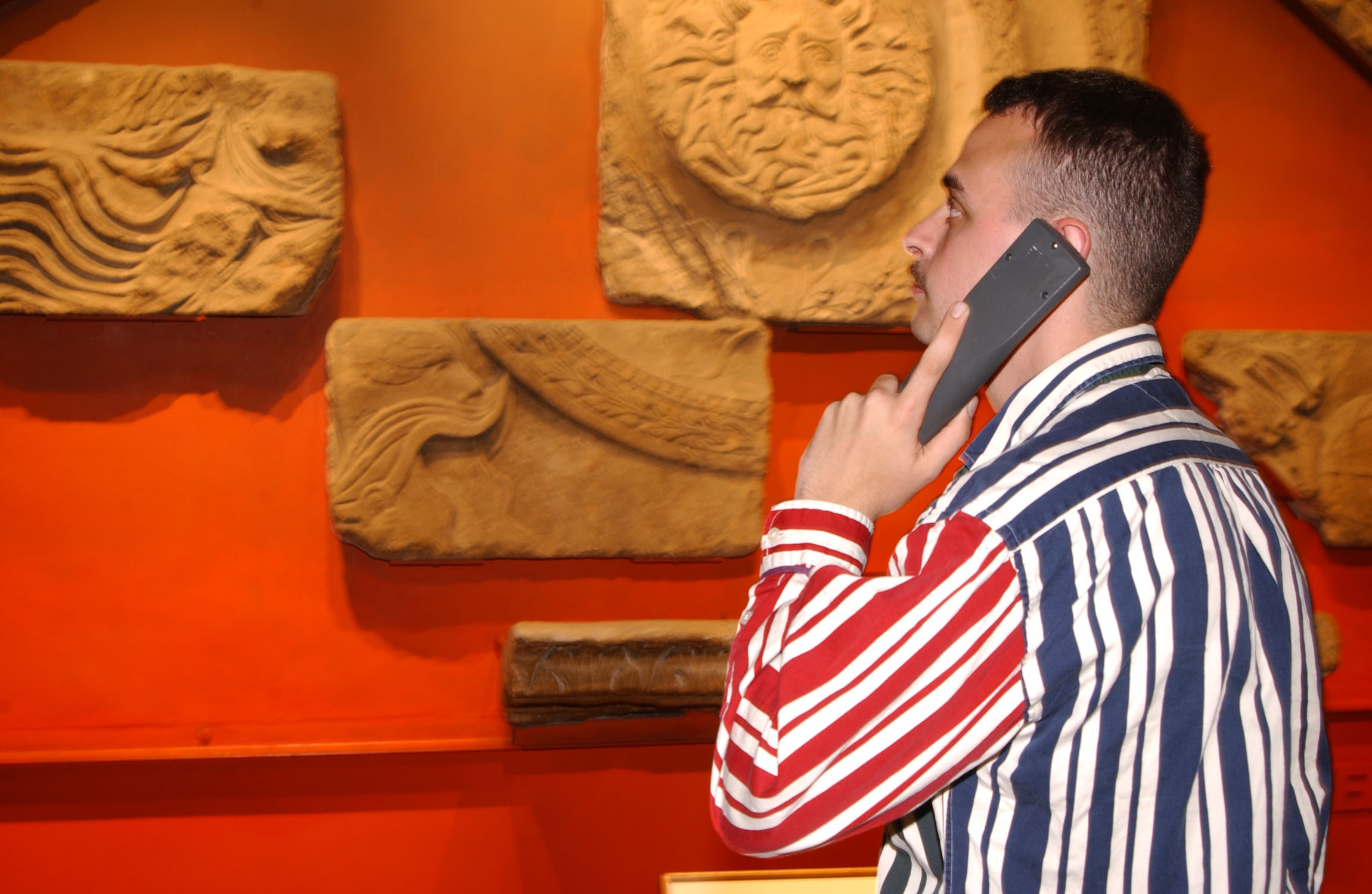
Sailor listens to an audio tour-guide

Modern museums make it possible to personalize the museum experience in ways never before. It is now common for museums to offer handheld devices to their gallery visitors, such as audio guides and hand-drawn maps.

In general, visitors to these museums have their own digital docents and the realization of technical handheld devices can discuss artifacts of personal interest to them, providing a digital twist on traditional museum guided tours.

As handheld computers become less expensive, museum professionals continue to experiment with the capabilities of these devices, offering their visitors detailed text and digital images in addition to audio tracks. When handheld computers have become less expensive, museum professionals continue to experiment with the capabilities of these devices, offering their visitors' detailed text and digital images in addition to audio tracks.

As more museums integrate such systems into their exhibits and learning experiences, projects that explore the educational potential of mobile computing devices in museums are becoming especially crucial. Some museums, such as the Minneapolis Institute of Arts and the Walker Art Center, allow online visitors to group digital artifacts into personal galleries, share them with other online visitors and annotate them with textual descriptions.

== Management ==
Information management skills are essential for museum professionals, as they are often tasked with manipulating information and technologies resources used in museums.

These days, museum professionals have become increasingly concerned with the ability of museums to function in the information society, to meet user needs, and to ensure that the right information resources are available at the right time and place, inside or outside the museum. Eventually, to improve the interactions between museums and visitors. To accomplish these goals, a new role has emerged for information professionals in museums. Changing ideas about the museum's position as an information service organization often requiring them to learn new information management skills and integrate new information technologies into their daily work and pose challenges for museum professionals.

The rapid development of information and communication technologies requires museum professionals to adapt to the arrival of information age. While some technical jobs can be outsourced, such as web design and data management, museums that do not have in-house skills with museum informatics will find it difficult to meet the constantly evolving demands of their increasingly information-savvy audiences. Museums need individuals on staff who can guide them through the hazards of planning digitization projects, purchasing collections information systems, or joining online data-sharing initiatives.

Museum researchers are required to study museum informatics within complex organizational and social contexts affecting the nature of museums in general and the expectations of museum professionals and visitors in particular.

In this way, professionals and researchers can be better in embracing the growing role of museum informatics in the twenty-first-century museum, and continue to explore the socio-technical implications of people, information, and technology interacting in museums.

== See also ==
- Archival informatics
- Library science

== Bibliography ==
- Giannini, Tula; Bowen, Jonathan P., eds. (2019). Museums and Digital Culture: New Perspectives and Research. Series on Cultural Computing. Springer. doi:10.1007/978-3-319-97457-6. ISBN 978-3-319-97456-9. S2CID 146115899.
- Marty, P.F.; Rayward, W.B.; Twidale, M.B. (2003). "Museum Informatics". Annual Review of Information Science and Technology. 37: 259–294. doi:10.1002/aris.1440370107.
- Marty, P.F. (2003). "Museum Informatics". Encyclopedia of Library and Information Science. New York: Marcel Dekker. pp. 1906–1913.
- Tallon, Loïc; Walker, Kevin (2008). Digital Technologies and the Museum Experience. AltaMira Press, Rowman & Littlefield Publishers. ISBN 978-0-7591-1119-6.
