= Gannis =

Gannis is a surname. Notable people with the surname include:

- Carla Gannis, American artist
- Cassie Gannis (born 1991), American stock car racing driver

== See also ==
- Ragheed Ganni (1972–2007), Iraqi Chaldean Catholic priest
