= Archives and Museum Informatics =

Archives and Museum Informatics is a journal published by Springer. Begun in 1987, as the Archival Informatics Newsletter, it assumed its present title with volume 3 in 1989. The first ten volumes were published by Archives & Museum Informatics which sold the title to Kluwer in 1997.

== Overview ==
The journal provides an international focus for knowledge representation and information management issues with respect to cultural heritage. Papers include technical contributions to cultural informatics, covering theoretical aspects, case studies, etc. The journal's subject areas cover interdisciplinary aspects in the following areas: Humanities, Social sciences and Law, Computer science, Document preparation and Text processing, Library science, Arts, Data structures, Cryptography and Information theory, and Management of Computing and Information systems.

== ISSN information ==
- ISSN 1042-1467 (print version)
- ISSN 1573-7500 (online version)

== See also ==
- Archival informatics
- Museum informatics
