= Museums and Digital Culture =

2019 book

Museums and Digital Culture: New Perspectives and Research
- Editor: Tula Giannini; Jonathan P. Bowen
- Language: English
- Series: Springer Series on Cultural Computing
- Subject: Museums, museum informatics, digital culture, digital humanities
- Genre: Non-fiction
- Publisher: Springer Nature Switzerland AG
- Publication date: 2019
- Media type: Print (hardcover), electronic
- Pages: xxviii+590
- ISBN: 978-3-319-97456-9
- OCLC: 1042394473

Museums and Digital Culture (2019) is an interdisciplinary book about developments in digital culture with respect to museums. It is edited by Tula Giannini and Jonathan P. Bowen, who are also the authors of 12 chapters. The book is part of the Springer Series on Cultural Computing, edited by Ernest Edmonds. The book was launched at the EVA London 2019 Conference.

== Contents ==
The book is divided into nine parts, with 28 chapters by a variety of authors. The book includes a foreword by Loïc Tallon, co-editor of the 2008 book Digital Technologies and the Museum Experience. There is also a preface, list of contributors and abbreviations, and an index.

=== Parts ===
The book is divided into the following parts:

1. Introduction
2. Philosophy and Theory
3. Exhibitions
4. Collections
5. Audiences
6. Digital Artists
7. Education
8. Libraries and Archives
9. Digital Future

=== Contributors ===
The following authors contributed to chapters in the book:

- Rachel Ara (London)
- Stefania Boiano (InvisibleStudio)
- Ann Borda (The University of Melbourne)
- Jonathan P. Bowen (London South Bank University)
- Stephen J. Bury (The Frick Collection)
- Seb Chan (Australian Centre for the Moving Image)
- Catherine Devine (Microsoft)
- Sara Devine (Brooklyn Museum)
- Douglas Dodds (Victoria and Albert Museum)
- Stuart Dunn (King's College London)
- Graeme Earl (King's College London)
- Ernest Edmonds (De Montfort University)
- Tom Ensom (Tate Gallery)
- Patrícia Falcão (Tate Gallery)
- Rosanna Flouty (New York University)
- Anna Foka (Uppsala University & Umeå University)
- Francesca Franco (University of Exeter)
- Giuliano Gaia (InvisibleStudio)
- Carla Gannis (Pratt Institute)
- Tula Giannini (Pratt Institute)
- Courtney Johnston (Museum of New Zealand Te Papa Tongarewa)
- Nick Lambert (Ravensbourne University London)
- Andy Lomas (Goldsmiths, University of London)
- Ross Parry (University of Leicester)
- Gareth Polmeer (Royal College of Art)
- Judith Siefring (Bodleian Libraries, University of Oxford)
- Matt Tarr (American Museum of Natural History)
- Deborah Turnbull Tillman (University of New South Wales & New Media Curation)
- Bruce Wands (School of Visual Arts, New York City)
- Will Wootton (King's College London)

== Reviews ==
The book has been reviewed in the following journals:

- Museum Management and Curatorship.
- MedieKultur: Journal of Media and Communication Research.
- MIDAS: Museus e Estudos Interdisciplinares.
- Journal of Cultural Management and Cultural Policy.

== The Arts and Computational Culture ==
In 2024, the editors produced a follow-on volume in the same Springer series, The Arts and Computational Culture: Real and Virtual Worlds, considering the arts with respect to computational culture, including 27 contributed chapters in seven parts, with a foreword by Paul Brown, a computational artist. The book has been reviewed in the journals Nature and International Journal of Humanities and Arts Computing.
