= Brooklyn Visual Heritage =

American digital history website

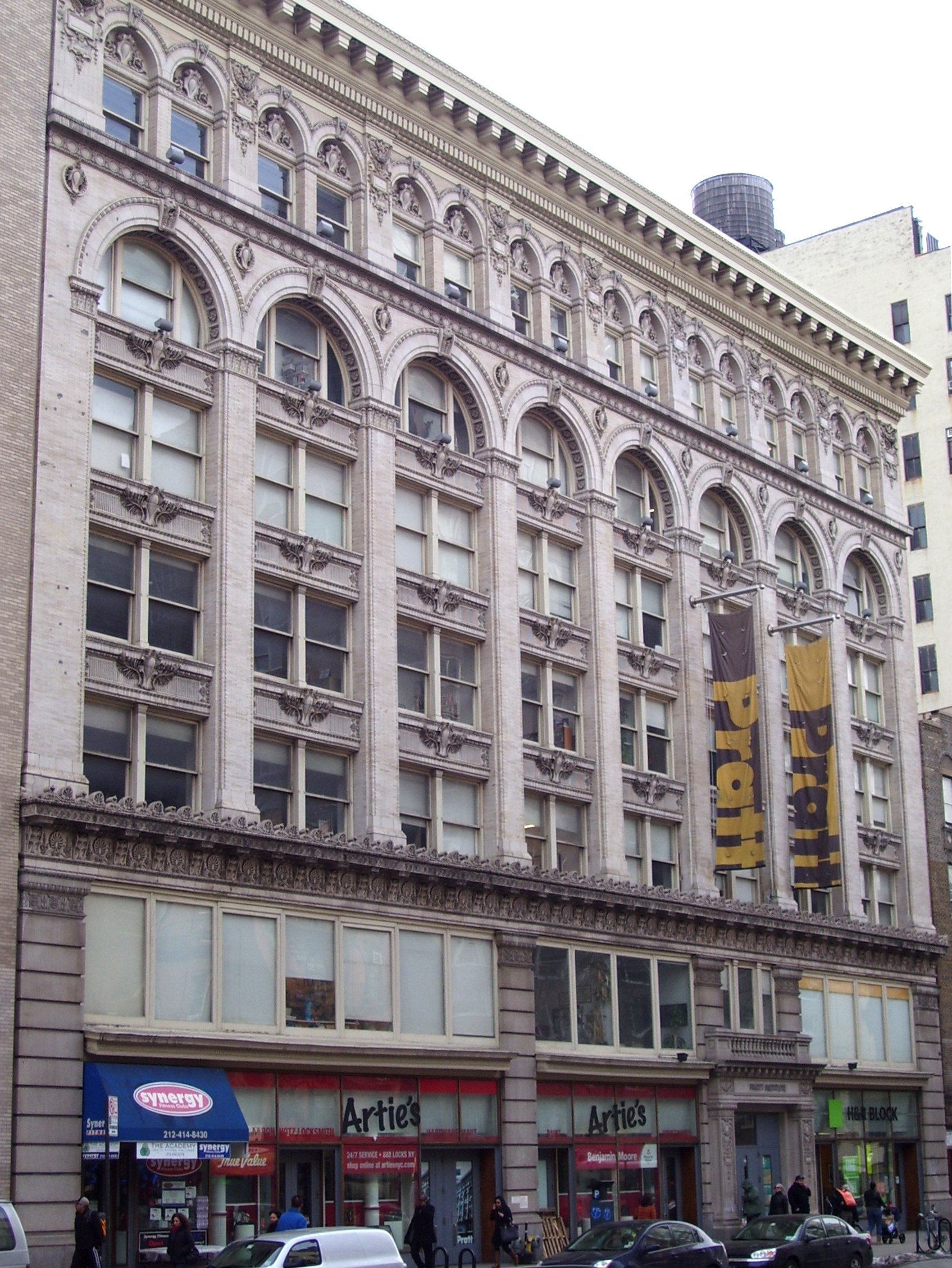
Pratt Manhattan Campus at 146 West 14th Street, location of Pratt SILS, lead partner of Project CHART

Brooklyn Visual Heritage is an online digital history website resource produced by Project CHART, presenting historical 19th and 20th century photographs of Brooklyn, New York City, held by several cultural institutions.

== Project CHART ==
Project CHART was a collaboration between the Pratt Institute School of Information and Library Science (SILS), Brooklyn Historical Society, Brooklyn Public Library, and Brooklyn Museum.

The three-year project was funded by the US Institute of Museum and Library Services (IMLS) through a grant submitted by Tula Giannini and the Laura Bush 21st Century Librarian Program. It made use of Pratt Institute SILS masters students.

The website was launched publicly in 2013.

== See also ==
- History of Brooklyn
- Brooklyn Look
