= Best of the Web =

Best of the Web can refer to:

- Best of the Web awards at the Museums and the Web conference
- Best of the Web Today, a former column by James Taranto on WSJ.com
- Informally, it sometimes is used to refer to the Webby Awards
