= Lura Gibbons Currier =

American librarian

Lura Gibbons Currier (née Gibbons, 1912-1983) was an American librarian who worked as the director of the Mississippi Library Commission. She greatly expanded the system and oversaw the early stages of the system's desegregation.

== Early life and career ==
Gibbons was born in Erie, Kansas to road-builder Vaughn Gibbons and his wife, Frances. Her father's career caused her family to move around the United States frequently. She received two bachelor's degrees, one in English from Mississippi Southern College in 1937, and another in Library Science from Texas Women's University in 1940. She also began her library work in 1940, working at several libraries in Texas. In 1945, Gibbons married Alfred R. Currier, a member of the United States Navy and moved to Washington with him. Although the marriage quickly dissolved, she continued to use her married name throughout her career. In Washington, she worked in library public relations, receiving the John Cotton Dana Award for her work in 1948. In 1950, she left Washington for Mississippi, where she began her work with the Mississippi Library Commission.

== Work with the Mississippi Library Commission ==
Currier began her tenue with the Mississippi Library Commission as a field representative but was the commission's director by the time she resigned. She was heavily involved with the creation of new libraries. She oversaw the opening of libraries in 70 towns that had previously lacked them, the total renovation of libraries in 38 more, and a vast expansion of bookmobile service. These projects were facilitated by her previously developed public relations skills, which helped her obtain the necessary funding.

During Currier's time with the Commission, the civil rights movement was gaining momentum. However, Currier's efforts to provide library services to African-American communities were more focused on opening new segregated libraries, rather than desegregating existing libraries. During this era, the American Library Association (ALA) took a stronger stance against segregation, forbidding library professionals who belonged to segregated library associations from attending national meetings as members of those associations. As director of the Mississippi Library Commission, Currier opposed this policy, claiming that it would delay desegregation in Southern libraries, and chose to sever ties with the ALA rather than push for the commission and its libraries to desegregate. Although she disapproved of segregation, she made little to no attempt to disrupt the status quo until Mississippi's libraries were ordered to desegregate, at which point she advised librarians to comply with the order. By the time Currier left the Commission in 1967, 70% of Mississippi's public libraries complied with the Civil Rights Act of 1964, indicating that although she made progress, she did not successfully complete the desegregation of her organization's domain.

== Later life and death ==
After leaving the Mississippi Library Commission, Currier moved back to Washington, where she worked as a library development specialist for Washington State University. Currier's last official position was as the director of the Pacific Northwest Bibliographic Center. She retired from this position in 1977 and returned to Mississippi, where she worked in librarianship in an unofficial capacity for the rest of her life. At the time of her death in 1983, Currier was serving on the Pascagoula City Library Board. Her papers were donated to the University of Southern Mississippi in 1986.
