= The Museum Experience =

1992 non-fiction book

- Author: John H. Falk; Lynn D. Dierking
- Language: English
- Genre: Non-fiction
- Publisher: Whalesback Books
- Publication date: 1992
- Publication place: United States

The Museum Experience is a non-fiction book written by John H. Falk and Lynn D. Dierking. It is considered by many in the museum profession to be amongst the most important books on museum learning.

Originally published in 1992, The Museum Experience introduced "The Interactive Experience Model" also known as the "Contextual Model of Learning". This model proposes a framework for the experience of museum visitors using three contexts:

- Personal context
- Social context
- Physical context

Falk and Dierking further argue that these contexts are constructed by the visitor. The interaction of these three contexts over time constructs the visitor's museum experience.

The museum experience begins, Falk and Dierking argue, when someone first thinks about going to a museum and lasts long after they have left the museum building. The Contextual Model of Learning is not a definition of learning, but rather it is intended to be a model for thinking about and organizing the complexities of learning in a free-choice environment.

== Personal context ==
Falk and Dierking describe personal context as “one’s prior knowledge, prior experiences, interest, motivation, choice, and control.” The authors emphasize that each visitor brings a unique personal context to each visit.

In this way, Falk and Dierking postulate that each visitor sets up their own individual "agenda" when entering a museum space. Falk and Dierking also assert that the visitor's attitude towards the experience and museum also plays a role in their personal context and "agenda".

For example, some visitors might be frequent museum-goers, so their personal context will be infinitely different from a visitor who does not tour museums very often. Additionally, some people are kinesthetic learners, and some are visual or auditory learners. These are all aspects that affect a museum visitor's personal context, and eventually lead to each visitor personalizing the museum's message to fit their own learning style and unique "agenda".

== Physical context ==
Two chapters are devoted to analyzing the ways in which visitors navigate the physical space of a museum. Falk and Dierking define the museum experience as "not just the result of interactions with exhibits, but the sum of his constructed personal, social and physical contexts" and go on to further posit that by working together, social and physical contexts create predictable visitor behaviors.

These behaviors are examined through notions of "museum fatigue", "object satiation", and "holding power". One aspect which must be considered, however, is that the evaluations which describe and interpret these behaviors are themselves culturally influenced. Behavioral settings allow us to conceptualize how people are influenced by physical space, as explained by Barker and Wright in Midwest and Its Children:

Despite the diversity of people who visit museums and the diversity of museums, themselves, as well as the variety of exhibit content and design, research on the physical context has demonstrated that most visitors behave in a fairly predictable manner, and that they will, in fact, spend a large percentage of their time attending to the exhibit in objects on display.

Falk and Dierking explain that visitors do not respond passively to exhibits and labels. While labels serve their purpose in the museum, "virtually all visitors read some labels, but no visitor reads all labels". By reading labels and engaging with the exhibits, visitors try to relate what they are seeing to their own experience (p. 74). Experience with these objects and labels allows for concrete delivery of facts to large numbers of people, further enhanced by the ideas of a holistic museum experience (p. 78).

== Social context ==
The third chapter analyzes three different ‘social contexts’ that affect museum learning.

=== Family visitors ===
The authors note that, within the context of a museum visit, family groups behave differently than adult groups. They cite Robert Lakota, who conducted a study at the National Museum of Natural History in Washington, D.C., in 1975. Lakota found that within family groups, adults selected the hall or exhibition to be viewed, but then allowed the children to determine the level of engagement with the material. Once the children grew bored, the family group quickly moved on to another exhibit.

Regardless of the content of a museum exhibition, the physical needs of the children come first; a full bladder or empty stomach can put an end to even the most compelling gallery visit. Within the context of a gallery visit, the authors note that adult visitors are more likely to read informational materials provided by the museum, while children are the first to manipulate hands-on exhibits. Group conversations may be sparked by an interesting object or display, but often veer off to related topics or events in the social life of the family.

Ultimately, Falk and Dierking conclude that, to the average family group, a museum visit is comparable to a picnic, sporting event or other family outing. To the family, the general experience of spending leisure time together is more important than the chosen activity.

=== School field trips ===
The authors argue that the organized nature of school field trips often triggers greater anxiety than disorganized trips. To alleviate anxiety, the authors argue that it is important for the peers, that is other children, to be in consistent communication with each other throughout the museum trip. Citing Barbara Birney, the authors argue that children get more out of the museum experience interacting with each other than with docents or other adults on the museum trip.

=== Other visitors ===
The final section of the text handles miscellaneous aspects of social pressure in the museum visit outside of the family visit or school trip context, including:

- Interactive exhibits
- Auditory experiences
- Mimicry of other museum attendees behavior in the museum space
