= Ernest Edmonds =

British artist (born 1942)

Ernest Edmonds FIET
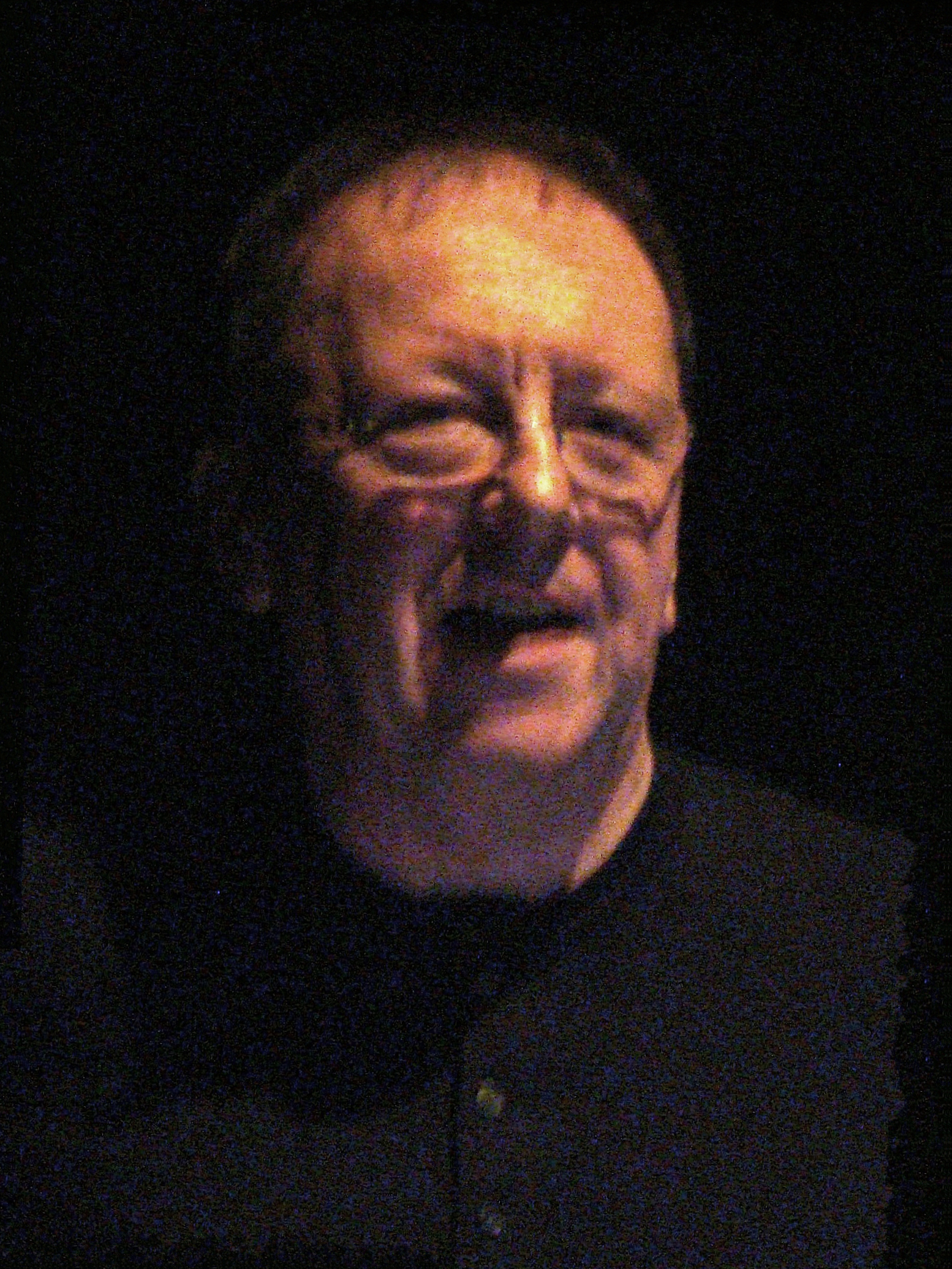
- Ernest Edmonds in 2008
- Born: 1942 (age 83–84); London, England
- Education: University of Leicester; University of Nottingham
- Employer(s): University of Technology Sydney; De Montfort University
- Known for: Digital art
- Style: Constructivism
- Awards: ACM SIGGRAPH Distinguished Artist Award for Lifetime Achievement In Digital Art; 2017; ACM SIGCHI Lifetime Achievement Award for the Practice of Computer Human Interaction; 2017
- Website: ernestedmonds.com

Ernest Edmonds (born 1942, London, England) is a British artist, a pioneer in the field of computer art and its variants, algorithmic art, generative art, interactive art, from the late 1960s to the present. His work is represented in the Victoria and Albert Museum, as part of the National Archive of Computer-Based Art and Design.

== Life and work ==
Ernest Edmonds is a pioneer of digital art. In 2017, he received the ACM SIGGRAPH Distinguished Artist Award for Lifetime Achievement In Digital Art. He also is an international expert on Human-Computer Interaction who specialises in creative technologies for creative uses. In 2017, he received the ACM SIGCHI Lifetime Achievement Award for the Practice of Computer Human Interaction. He was one of the first to predict the value of iterative design and a very early advocate of iterative design methods and Agile software development. He founded the ACM Creativity and Cognition Conference series and was part of the founding team for the ACM Intelligent User Interface conference series.

Edmonds studied Mathematics and Philosophy at Leicester University. He has a PhD in logic from the University of Nottingham, is a Fellow of the British Computer Society, and a Fellow of the Institution of Engineering and Technology. He has nearly 300 refereed publications in the fields of human-computer interaction, creativity and art and was a pioneer in the development of practice-based PhD programmes. Ernest Edmonds is Emeritus Professor of Computational Art at De Montfort University, Leicester, UK.

== Art ==
Edmonds’ art is in the constructivist tradition and he first used computers in his art practice in 1968. He first showed an interactive work with Stroud Cornock in 1970. He first showed a generative time-based computer work in London in 1985. He has exhibited throughout the world, from Moscow to Los Angeles. The Victoria and Albert Museum, London, holds some of his artwork and is collecting his archives within the National Archive of Computer Based Art and Design.

In 2014, Edmonds curated a seminal historical exhibition, Automatic Art, at GV art gallery, London.

== Selected exhibitions ==
- 2017

Ernest Edmonds, De Montfort University Gallery Leicester UK
Constructs, Colour, Code: Ernest Edmonds 1967–2017

- 2013

Ernest Edmonds, Conny Dietzschold Gallery, Sydney
Transformations: Digital Prints from the V&A collection, Royal Brompton Hospital, UK

- 2012/3

Light Logic. Site Gallery, Sheffield, UK
Selected New Acquisitions. Victoria and Albert Museum, London

- 2012

Intuition and Integrity, Kinetica, London; Lighthouse, Brighton; Lovebytes, Sheffield, Phoenix, Leicester
Transformations: Digital Prints from the V&A collection, Great Western Hospital, Swindon, UK
Visualise Poetry, Language, Code, Cambridge, UK

- 2010

Grid Gallery, Vivid festival, Sydney

- 2009

When Ideas Become Form—20 Years, Conny Dietzschold Gallery, Sydney
Cities Tango, Conny Dietzschold Gallery, Sydney and ISEA, Belfast

- 2007

Ernest Edmonds and Alf Loehr, Conny Dietzschold Gallery, Sydney
Speculative Data and the Creative Imaginary, National Academy of Sciences Gallery, Washington DC
ColorField Remix, WPA\C Experimental Media Series (performance), Corcoran Gallery of Art, Washington DC

- 2005

White Noise, Australian Centre for the Moving Image, Melbourne
Ernest Edmonds and David Thomas, Conny Dietzschold Gallery, Sydney
Minimal Approach… Concrete Tendencies, Tin Sheds Gallery, University of Sydney

- 2004

Australian Concrete Constructive Art, Conny Dietzschold Gallery, Sydney
SIGGRAPH Art Exhibition, Los Angeles
GRAPHITE Art Exhibition, Singapore
Sonar2004Festival, Barcelona

- 2000

Global Echos. Mondriaanhuis, Amersfoort
Constructs & Reconstructions, Loughborough University
2000: Relativities, Bankside Gallery, London, and tour

- 1999

Galerie Jean-Mark Laik, Koblenz Science in the Arts—Arts in Science, Hungarian Academy of Fine Arts, Budapest

- 1994

Digital Arts, The Mall Gallery, London
Friends of Mesures. Vervier and Antwerp

- 1990

SISEA, Groningen—collaborative performance
Avant Garde 1990, Manege, Moscow
Art Creating Society. Museum of Modern Art, Oxford
Heads and Legs. Liege (one-person) including a collaborative performance

- 1989

Constructivism versus Computer. Galerie FARO, World Trade Centre, Rotterdam
Re-Views: Contemporary systematic and constructive arts. The Small Mansion Arts Centre, London

- 1988

Null-Dimension. Galerie New Space, Fulda (and 1989, Gmunden, Austria)

- 1985

Duality and Co-existence. Exhibiting Space, London (one-person).

- 1975

2nd International Drawing Biennale. Middlesbrough Art Gallery, Cleveland, and tour

- 1972

Cognition and Control. Midland Group Gallery, Nottingham

== Bibliography ==
- Franco, Francesca (2013). "Documenting Art as Art: The Case of Notes (2000–ongoing) by British Artist Ernest Edmonds". Visual Resources. 29 (4): 2013. doi:10.1080/01973762.2013.846793. S2CID 192112864.
- Edmonds, Ernest; Franco, Francesca (2010). "Art of Conversation". In Franco, F.; Gardiner, J.; Lambert, N. (eds.). Ideas before their time – Connecting the past and present in computer art. London: British Computer Society.
- Franco, Francesca (2012). "Ernest Edmonds' Experiments in Colour, Structure, Time and Space". In Sillars, Laura (ed.). Ernest Edmonds: Light Logic. Sheffield: Site Gallery.
- Franco, Francesca (2017). Generative Systems Art: The Work of Ernest Edmonds. Routledge. ISBN 978-1472436009.
- Edmonds, Ernest (2018). "Algorithmic Art Machines". Arts. 7: 3. doi:10.3390/arts7010003. hdl:2086/15275.
- Edmonds, Ernest; Franco, Francesca (2019). "Chapter 18: Evolving Installations: "Shaping Space"". In Giannini, T.; Bowen, J.P. (eds.). Museums and Digital Culture: New Perspectives and Research. Series on Cultural Computing. Springer. pp. 367–379. doi:10.1007/978-3-319-97457-6_18. ISBN 978-3-319-97456-9. S2CID 159042728.
- Boden, Margaret A.; Edmonds, Ernest (2019). From Fingers to Digits: An Artificial Aesthetic. The MIT Press. ISBN 978-0262039628.
