= Steve.museum =

First conceptualised in 2005, the steve.museum project was a collaborative effort to improve public access to and engagement with US art museum collections. It explored the possibilities of user-generated descriptions of works of art, also known as folksonomy. Project staff in 2011 comprised a group of volunteers, mostly from art museums, including the Guggenheim Museum, the Cleveland Museum of Art, the Metropolitan Museum of Art and the San Francisco Museum of Modern Art, as well as Archives & Museum Informatics.

In a folksonomy, users tag content for the purposes of later retrieval. It allows the public to introduce new search-terms, in the form of tags, to the formal library catalog that art and cataloging professionals themselves might not have included. It also allows curators and other museum professionals to see what the public sees in works of art. These terms will enrich the catalog and increase the likelihood that searchers of all levels will find what they are looking for. In the end, it is hoped that museum collections will be fully searchable by keywords rather than just by name or artist. Early results from the project found that a number of tags were applied often, while others were applied just once per work of art.

The project received a $1 million grant from the US Institute of Museum and Library Services, from which the Indianapolis Museum of Art worked to apply folksonomy to its collection,. It was one of a number of related projects currently working to make art more accessible and to find its role in the digital age.

== See also ==
- Folk taxonomy
- Museum informatics
- Social bookmarking
- Tag (metadata)
