= Grindstone Island (Ontario) =

Island in Ontario, Canada

Coordinates: 44°42′39″N 76°13′52″W

Grindstone Island is an 11-acre (4.5 ha) island in Big Rideau Lake, Ontario, Canada.

== History ==
The island was used by Charles Kingsmill, the first Admiral of the Royal Canadian Navy, as his summer residence. The main lodge was built in the early 20th century around an earlier 19th-century structure. During the 1960s and 1970s, after ownership of the site had passed to Kingsmill's daughter Diana Kingsmill Wright, the island was used in a Quaker programme for training in nonviolence, and also as a co-operative conference centre. In August 1965, the island was the scene for a role-playing exercise — later referred to as "the Grindstone Experiment" — in nonviolent social defence.

During the 1980s it hosted a summer camp for children. It is now used by Archives & Museum Informatics for seminars and meetings dealing with issues concerning culture and information technology.

The summer camp in the 1980s was, and still is, an important part of the lives of many who attended. It was an accepting and diverse collection of kids mostly from Ontario in the Toronto to Ottawa corridor. Children played games such as the popcorn game and the survival game which taught them about the distribution of wealth and power in society and the natural world.
