= Silvia Filippini-Fantoni =

Museum director

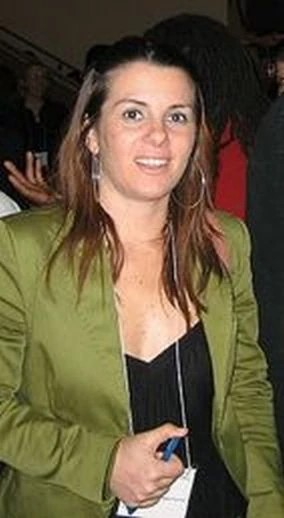
- Filippini-Fantoni in 2010
- Born: 1974 (age 51–52); Bergamo, Italy
- Education: University of Milan; Paris 1 Panthéon-Sorbonne University
- Occupation: Museum director
- Employer(s): Indianapolis Museum of Art; North Carolina Museum of Art; Newark Museum of Art; Westmoreland Museum of American Art
- Known for: Museum Influencer List 2020
- Notable work: Digital Technologies and the Museum Experience (2008)

Silvia Filippini-Fantoni (born 1974) is an art museum director, originally from Italy and based in the United States.

== Education ==
Filippini-Fantoni was born in Bergamo, northern Italy. She has an undergraduate degree in History and Aesthetics and Art Sciences from the Universita degli Studi di Milano in Italy and a PhD degree from the Université Paris I-Sorbonne in Paris, France.

== Career ==
Filippini-Fantoni held a number of positions with museums in Europe including the British Museum in London, and also organizations supporting the museum industry, including Antenna Audio in London and Cogapp, a digital content producer in Brighton, UK, as well as teaching at the University Paris I-Sorbonne. She also collaborated on a project with Tate Modern in London.

She moved to the United States, where she continued to work with museums. She worked as an intern at the J. Paul Getty Museum in Los Angeles and collaborated on a project with the Metropolitan Museum of Art in New York. Later, she joined the Indianapolis Museum of Art at Newfields, Indiana. She then served as Director of Programs and Audience Engagement at the North Carolina Museum of Art in Raleigh, North Carolina. Then she joined the Newark Museum of Art (Newark, New Jersey) as the deputy director of Learning and Engagement. In 2023, she became the Richard M. Scaife Director and CEO of the Westmoreland Museum of American Art in Greensburg, Pennsylvania.

In 2020, Filippini-Fantoni was listed as one of 50 key individuals and influencers by Blooloop on its Museum Influencer List 2020.

== See also ==
- List of women art museum directors
