= Lynn D. Dierking =

American educator

Lynn Diane Dierking is a Sea Grant Professor in Free-Choice Learning, Science & Mathematics Education in the College of Science at Oregon State University. She is also the Associate Dean for Research in the College of Education at Oregon State.

Dierking is best known for research on "free-choice learning" and "lifelong learning". She has been active in the museum and the education field since the 1970s, making contributions such as The Museum Experience, published in 1992 with John Falk.

== Books ==
- Falk, J.H. & Dierking L.D. (2018). "Learning from Museums, 2nd Edition" (Rowman & Littlefield)
- Falk, J.H. & Dierking, L.D. (2016). The Museum Experience Revisited. Walnut Creek, CA: Left Coast Press.
- Dierking, L.D. (2006). Foreword. In: C. Yao, L. Dierking, P. Anderson, Schatz, D. & Wolf, S. (Eds.) The handbook of small science centers. Lanham, MD: AltaMira Press.
- Falk, J.H. & L.D. Dierking, Eds., (1995). Public institutions for personal learning: Establishing a research agenda. Washington, D.C.: American Association of Museums.
- McCreedy, D. & L.D. Dierking, (2013). Cascading influences: Long-term impacts of informal STEM programs for girls. Philadelphia, PA: Franklin Institute Science Museum Press.
- Dierking, L.D., Falk, J.H., Holland, D., Fisher, S., Schatz, D. & Wilke, L. (1997). Collaboration: Critical Criteria for Success. Washington, D.C.: Association of Science-Technology Centers.
- Dierking, L.D. & W. Pollock. (1998). Questioning our assumptions from the start: An introduction to front- end studies in museums. Washington, D.C.: Association of Science-Technology Centers.
- Dierking, L.D. & Falk, J.H. (2002). Lessons without limit: How free-choice learning is transforming education.Walnut Creek, CA: AltaMira Press (Rowman & Littlefield).
- Dierking, L.D & Falk, J.H. (1992) The Museum Experience. Washington, DC: Whalesback Books.

== Awards ==
- NARST Distinguished Contributions to Science Education through Research Award (2016)
- John Cotton Dana Award for Leadership (2010)
- American Alliance of Museums Centennial Honor Roll (2006)
