= Archival informatics =

Theory and application of informatics in record keeping

Archival informatics is the theory and application of informatics in and around the realm of archives and record keeping. More specifically, it refers to the proper understanding and use of emerging technologies, techniques, and theories such as linguistic analysis, heuristics, and automation in the storage, manipulation and retrieval of archives and databases.

An Archival Informatics Newsletter was started in 1987.

== Etymology ==
The first use of informatics specifically within the field of archival science dates back to 1986 with the formation of Archives & Museum Informatics by David Bearman. He indicated that he borrowed the term from the field of biomedicine where "the importance of information technologies (like computers), information techniques (like full-text retrieval or digitizing radiographic images) and information theories, especially those of linguistic analysis, artificial intelligence, indexing and retrieval, are coming together in new ways of practicing medicine". The concept was critical to him because it illustrated a "system oriented view of the synergism of information based activities", rather than the more parochial view implied by confined subject names such as automation or computerization. Although it has been 21 years since this term has been introduced its usage is not common in literature; largely it is used in reference to Bearman's creation, though exceptions do exist.

== See also ==
- Museum informatics
- Information science
