= MuseWeb =

Museum website conference

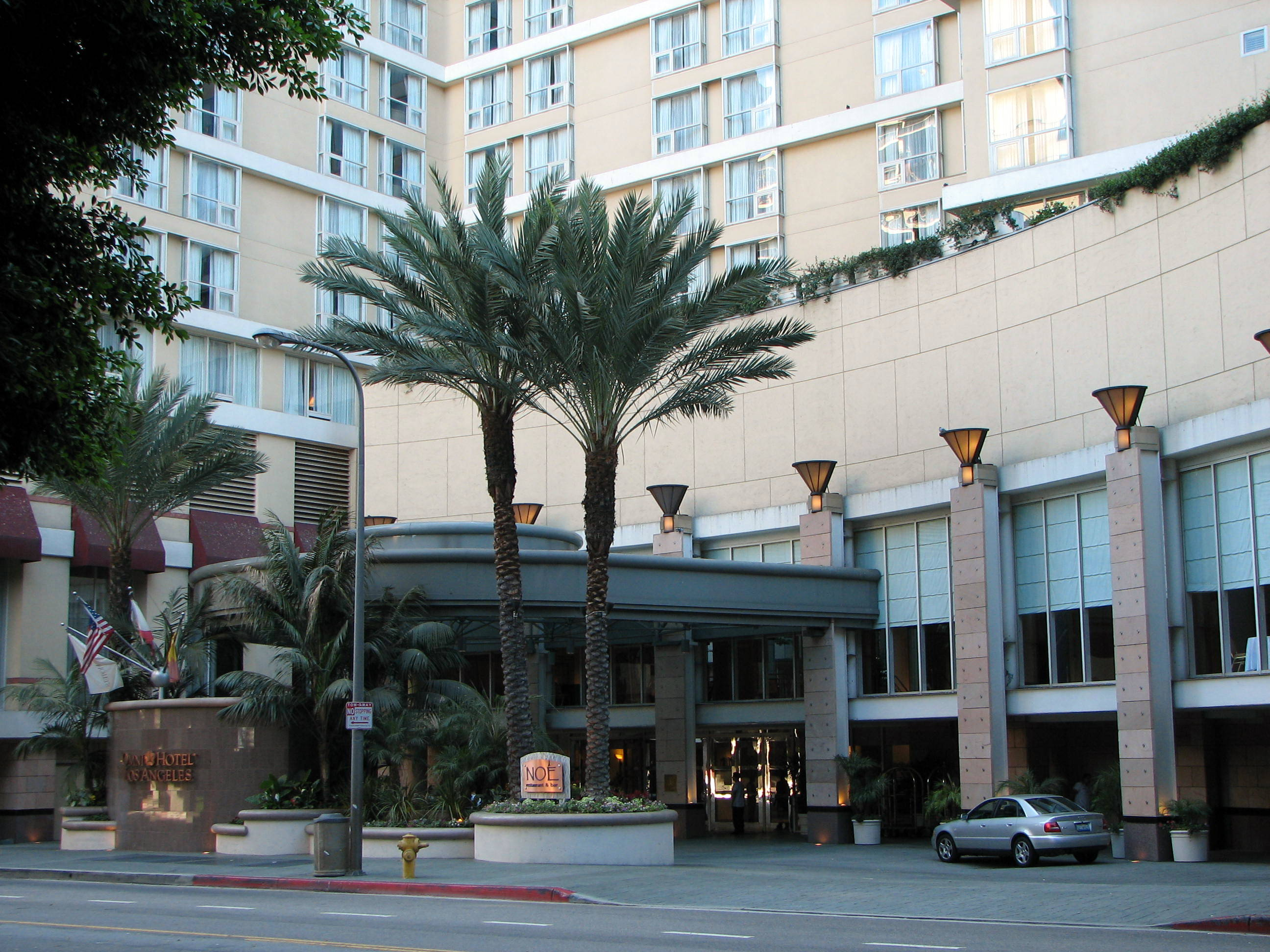
The Omni Hotel Los Angeles, USA, location of the first Museums and the Web conference in 1997.

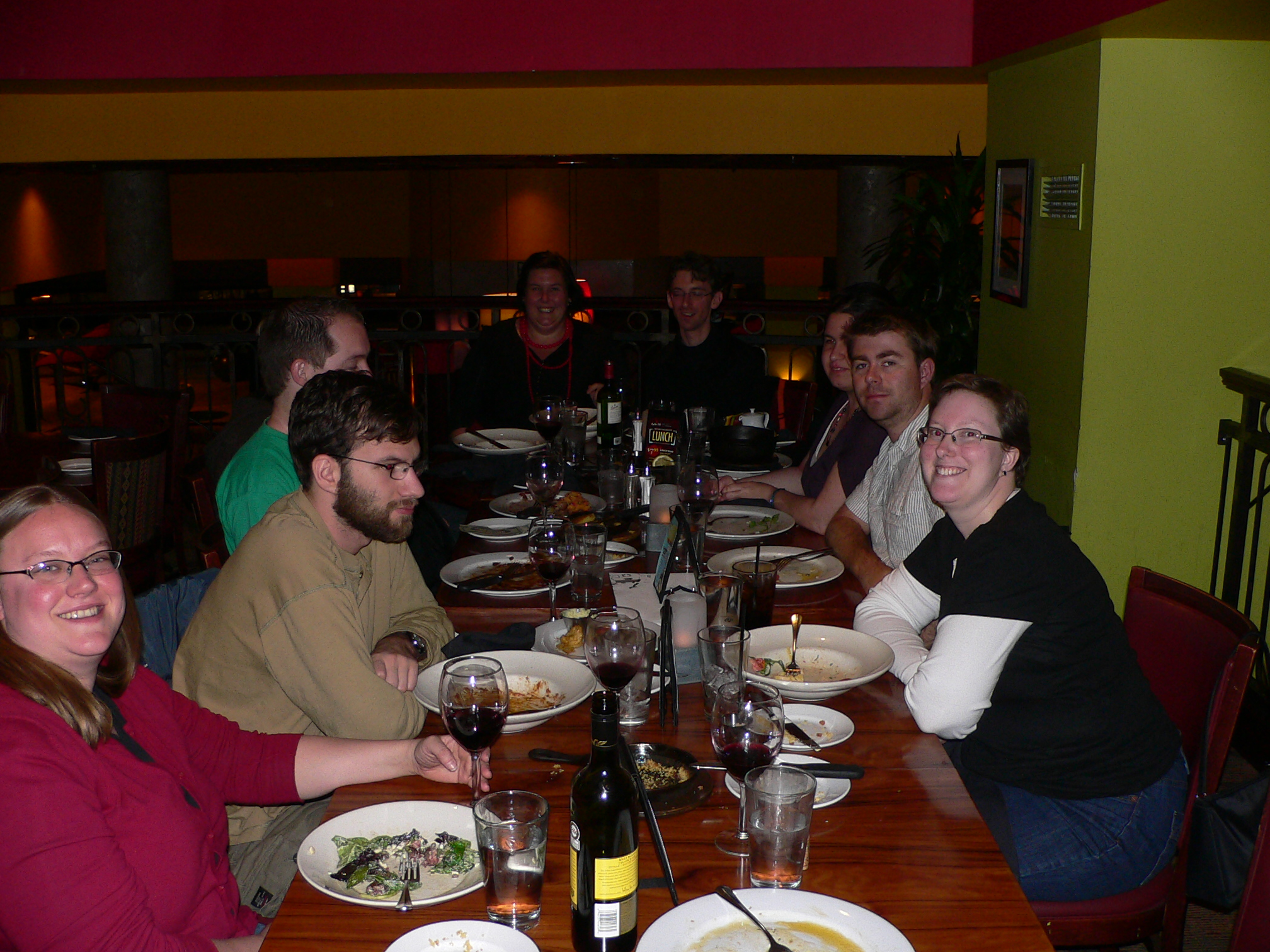
A gathering of a number of Wikipedians in Denver, USA, for the Museums and the Web 2010 conference (MW2010).

MuseWeb (formerly Museums and the Web) is an annual international conference in the field of museums and their websites. It was founded and organized by Archives & Museum Informatics and has taken place each spring since 1997 in North America, along with events in other countries.

Since 2011 it has been organized by Museums and the Web LLC and Co-Chaired by Nancy Proctor and Rich Cherry, who also co-edit the proceedings.

== Overview ==
The conference includes the GLAMi awards(The Galleries, Libraries, Archives, and Museums Innovation awards) which recognizes the best GLAM work in the sector. Projects are nominated by GLAM professionals from around the world and reviewed by a committee of peers. The conference previously included annual "Best of the Web awards" for museum-related websites in a number of different categories, as well as an overall winner.

== Individual conferences ==
The following events have been held or are planned:

1. MW1997, March 16–19, 1997 — Los Angeles, California, US
2. MW1998, April 22–25, 1998 — Toronto, Ontario, Canada
3. MW1999, March 11–14, 1999 — New Orleans, Louisiana, US
4. MW2000, April 16–19, 2000 — Minneapolis, Minnesota, US
5. MW2001, March 14–17, 2001 — Seattle, Washington, US
6. MW2002, April 17–20, 2002 — Boston, Massachusetts, US
7. MW2003, March 19–22, 2003 — Charlotte, North Carolina, US
8. MW2004, March 31 – April 3, 2004 — Arlington, Virginia / Washington DC, US
9. MW2005, April 13–17, 2005 — Vancouver, British Columbia, Canada
10. MW2006, March 22–25, 2006 — Albuquerque, New Mexico, US
11. MW2007, April 11–14, 2007 — San Francisco, California, US
12. MW2008, April 8–12, 2008 — Montreal, Quebec, Canada
13. MW2009, April 14–18, 2009 — Indianapolis, Indiana, US
14. MW2010, April 13–17, 2010 — Denver, Colorado, US
15. MW2011, April 6–9, 2011 — Philadelphia, Pennsylvania, US
16. MW2012, April 11–14, 2012 — San Diego, California, US
17. MW2013, April 17–20, 2013 — Portland, Oregon, US
18. MWA2013, December 9–12, 2013 — Hong Kong
19. MWF2014, February 19–21, 2014 — Florence, Italy
20. MW2014, April 2–5, 2014 — Baltimore, Maryland, US
21. MWA2014, October 7–10, 2014 — Daejeon & Seoul, South Korea
22. MW2015, April 8–11, 2015 — Chicago, Illinois, US
23. MWA2015, October 5–9, 2015 — Melbourne, Australia
24. MW2016, April 6–9, 2016 — Los Angeles, California, US
25. MW17, April 19–22, 2017 — Cleveland, Ohio, US
26. MW18, April 18–21, 2018 — Vancouver, British Columbia, Canada
27. MW19, April 2–6, 2019 — Boston, Massachusetts, US
28. MW20, March 31-April 4, 2020 — This event was scheduled to take place in Los Angeles, California, but due to the COVID-19 pandemic it was held virtually
29. MW21, April 5–9, 2021 — Washington DC, US

== See also ==
- ICHIM (International Cultural Heritage Informatics Meeting)
- EVA Conferences
- Best of the Web awards
