= Tula Giannini =

- Citizenship: United States
- Known for: Brooklyn Visual Heritage

Academic background
- Education: Manhattan School of Music; Rutgers University; Bryn Mawr College

Academic work
- Discipline: Information science
- Sub-discipline: Library science, Musicology
- Institutions: Catholic University; Rutgers University; University of Hawaiʻi; Westminster Choir College; Adelphi University; Pratt Institute
- Main interests: Digital culture
- Notable works: Museums and Digital Culture

Prof. Tula Giannini is an American academic with subject expertise in musicology, digital culture, and digital heritage.

Tula Giannini holds B.M. and M.M. degrees in Performance from the Manhattan School of Music, an M.L.S. degree in Library Science from Rutgers University, and a Ph.D. degree in Musicology from Bryn Mawr College. Early in her career, she was a professional flautist. She taught at the Catholic University, Rutgers University, and the University of Hawaiʻi. Director of the Talbott Library at Westminster Choir College, and Head of Collection Management at Adelphi University. She joined the Pratt Institute in 1998 and served as Dean of the School of Information and Library Science (SILS), from 2015 renamed to the School of Information under her leadership, From 2004 to 2017, Giannini served as Dean of the School of Information at Pratt Institute, where she is a tenured full professor.

Giannini has overseen the introduction of new academic/professional programs at the Pratt Institute, including: Advanced Certificates in Archives (2004), Museum Libraries (2005), Conservation and Digital Curation (2016); a Dual Masters with the Department of Digital Arts at Pratt (2008), which received an Innovation Award from NASED; an M.S. degree in Museums and Digital Culture (2015); M.S. in Information Experience Design and M.S. in Data Analytics and Visualization (2016). She received four significant Institute of Museum and Library Services (IMLS) grants for programs involving digital cultural heritage: GATEWAI (Graduate Archives Training and Education, Work and Information); M-LEAD I and M-LEAD II (Museum Library Education and Digitization); and CHART (Cultural Heritage: Access, Research and Technology), which resulted in the Brooklyn Visual Heritage website.

Giannini has contributed entries to The Grove Dictionary of Musical Instruments, published by Oxford University Press. She has also published books.

== Selected publications ==
- Giannini, T. (1993). Great Flute Makers of France: The Lot and Godfroy families, 1650–1900. Bingham. ISBN 978-0946113057.
- Giannini, T. (August 1993). "Jacques Hotteterre le Romain and his father, Martin: A re-examination based on recently found documents". Early Music. XXI (3). Oxford University Press: 377–395. doi:10.1093/em/XXI.3.377.
- Bowen, J.P.; Giannini, T. (2014). "Digitalism: The New Realism". EVA London 2014 Conference Proceedings on Electronic Visualisation and the Arts. Electronic Workshops in Computing. BCS: 324–331. doi:10.14236/ewic/eva2014.38.
- Giannini, T.; Bowen, J.P. (2016). "Curating Digital Life and Culture: Art and Information" (PDF). EVA London 2016 Conference Proceedings on Electronic Visualisation and the Arts. Electronic Workshops in Computing. BCS: 237–244. doi:10.14236/ewic/EVA2016.46.
- Giannini, T.; Bowen, J.P. (2017). "Life in Code and Digits: When Shannon met Turing". EVA London 2017 Conference Proceedings on Electronic Visualisation and the Arts. Electronic Workshops in Computing. BCS: 51–58. doi:10.14236/ewic/EVA2017.9.
- Giannini, T.; Bowen, J.P., eds. (2019). Museums and Digital Culture: New Perspectives and Research. Series on Cultural Computing. Springer. doi:10.1007/978-3-319-97457-6. ISBN 978-3-319-97456-9. S2CID 146115899.
- Giannini, T.; Bowen, J.P., eds. (2024). The Arts and Computational Culture: Real and Virtual Worlds. Series on Cultural Computing. Springer. doi:10.1007/978-3-031-53865-0. ISBN 978-3-031-53864-3. S2CID 270801523.
