= Best of the Web awards =

Museum-related web content award

Best of the Web awards was an annual contest for museum-related website content, organized each year at the Museums and the Web conference. A committee of peers recognizes the best museum work on the web. Sites are nominated by museum professionals from around the world. In 2016, the Museums and the Web conference renamed the award to the GLAMi Awards, honoring innovative contributions--not just on the web--from practitioners in the so-called "GLAM" sector--galleries, libraries, archives, and museums.

== Categories ==
Sites have been nominated in the following categories. To recognize the enormous evolution in the online space these categories have been updated for MW2013:

- Audio / Visual / Podcast - Rich Media (audio/film/interactive)
- Education
- Exhibition - Digital Exhibition
- Innovative / Experimental
- Long-lived
- Mobile
- Museum Professional
- Research / Online Collection - Research / Collections Online
- Social Media

An overall winner is chosen among all nominated sites. In addition, there is a People's Choice Award (based on voting by the Museums and the Web community), and an award for a Small organization (based on staff number, annual budget, and/or project budget).

All nominations are made through the Museums and the Web site http://www.museumsandtheweb.com/mw2012/best and are also available online for others to review. Sites can be nominated in any one of the categories.

Note that the award categories may change from year-to-year, evolving along with the current trends of online presence.

== Previous winners ==
=== 2015 ===
- Rich Media: Stinks, Bangs & Booms
- Education: Fondation Louis Vuitton: Become An Apprentice Architect http://archimoi.fondationlouisvuitton.fr/en/
- Education Honorable Mention: Cleveland Museum of Art: Studio Play http://mw2014.museumsandtheweb.com/bow/studio-play/
- Digital Exhibition: Van Go Yourself http://vangoyourself.com/
- Innovative / Experimental: Tate After Dark http://www.tate.org.uk/whats-on/tate-britain/special-event/after-dark
- Innovative / Experimental Honorable Mention: The Digital Pen http://www.cooperhewitt.org/new-experience/designing-pen/
- Long-lived: The non-museum museum - redesigning the Royal Academy online http://www.royalacademy.org.uk
- Long-lived Honorable Mention: British Council Visual Arts http://visualarts.britishcouncil.org/
- Mobile: Field Guides to Australian Fauna - a suite of eight apps http://museumsvictoria.com.au/discoverycentre/museum-victoria-apps/national-field-guide-apps/
- Museum Professional: Art Detective https://web.archive.org/web/20160216200302/http://www.thepcf.org.uk/artdetective/
- Research / Collections Online: Living Collections Catalogue http://www.walkerart.org/collections/publications
- Social Media: 1840s GIF Party at Tate Britain http://mw2015.museumsandtheweb.com/bow/1840s-gif-party-at-tate-britain/
- Social Media Honorable Mention: #PlayArtfully http://mw2015.museumsandtheweb.com/bow/playartfully/
- People’s Choice: Van Go Yourself http://vangoyourself.com/
- Best of the Web: Art Detective https://web.archive.org/web/20160216200302/http://www.thepcf.org.uk/artdetective/

=== 2014 ===
- Rich Media: #Taull1123. Immersive experience in a World Heritage Site (or Augmented Reality without devices)' http://mw2014.museumsandtheweb.com/bow/taull1123-immersive-experience-in-a-world-heritage-site-or-augmented-reality-without-devices/
- Education: MoMA’s Catalysts: Artists Creating with Sound Video and Time' http://mw2014.museumsandtheweb.com/bow/catalysts-artists-creating-with-sound-video-and-time/
- Education Honourable Mention: Cleveland Museum of Art: Studio Play' http://mw2014.museumsandtheweb.com/bow/studio-play/
- Digital Exhibition: Cleveland Museum of Art: Collection Wall' http://www.clevelandart.org/gallery-one/collection-wall
- Innovative / Experimental: Dallas Museum of Art: DMA Friends' http://www.dma.org/visit/dma-friends
- Long-lived: Horniman Museums and Gardens' http://www.horniman.ac.uk/
- Mobile: Cleveland Museum of Art: ArtLens' http://mw2014.museumsandtheweb.com/bow/artlens/
- Museum Professional: Musepunks' http://museopunks.org/
- Research / Collections Online: Operation War Diary' http://www.operationwardiary.org/
- Research / Collections Online Honourable mention: Seattle Art Museum: The Online Catalogue of Chinese Painting & Calligraphy' http://chinesepainting.seattleartmuseum.org/OSCI/
- Social Media: In the Horniman' http://in-the-horniman.tumblr.com/
- Best Small Museum Project: Tang Museum “Classless Society” exhibition website' https://web.archive.org/web/20140306044625/https://tang.skidmore.edu/app/public/webroot/files/uploads/classless_society/index.html
- Best Small Museum Project Honourable mention: Victorian Collections' http://victoriancollections.net.au/
- People’s Choice: BoW Nomination: Reynolda House Museum of American Art' http://reynoldahouse.org
- Best of the Web: Dallas Museum of Art: DMA Friends' http://www.dma.org/visit/dma-friends

=== 2013 ===
- Rich Media: Anish Kapoor in MCA Publications http://www.mca.com.au/apps/mca-publications/
- Education: ArtNC http://artnc.org/
- Digital Exhibition: The Gallery of Lost Art http://galleryoflostart.com/
- Innovative / Experimental: Rijksstudio: Make Your Own Masterpiece http://www.rijksmuseum.nl/rijksstudio
- Long-lived: ArtBabble Redesign http://www.artbabble.org/
- Mobile: Sound Uncovered
- Museum Professional: Beyond the Printed Page: Museum Digital Publishing Bliki http://digitalpublishingbliki.com/
- Research / Collections Online: Cooper-Hewitt Online Collection http://collection.cooperhewitt.org/
- Social Media: Titanic on Twitter https://web.archive.org/web/20130426233131/http://mw2013.museumsandtheweb.com/bow/titanic-on-twitter/
- Best Small Museum Project: TXTilecity http://txtilecity.ca/
- People’s Choice: Rijksstudio: Make Your Own Masterpiece
- Best of the Web: Rijksstudio: Make Your Own Masterpiece

=== 2012 ===
- Audio / Visual / Podcast:
- Education:
- Exhibition:
- Innovative:
- Long Lived:
- Mobile:
- Museum Professional:
- Research / Online Collection:
- Social Media:
- Small:
- People's Choice:
- Best Overall:

=== 2011 ===
- Audio / Visual / Podcast: Museum Victoria ‘Access All Areas’ podcast adventures, designed in-house
- Education: Australian Centre for the Moving Image ACMI Generator, designed by Monkii https://web.archive.org/web/20120214044545/http://generator.acmi.net.au/
- Education (Honorable Mention): The College of Physicians of Philadelphia The History of Vaccines, designed by Night Kitchen Interactive http://www.historyofvaccines.org
- Exhibition: Museum of Modern Art Henri Cartier-Bresson: The Modern Century, designed by Second Story, Inc. http://moma.org/cartierbresson
- Exhibition (Honorable Mention): Center of Contemporary Culture of Barcelona (CCCB) City of Horrors, designed by Ignasi Rifé http://www.cccb.org/laciutatdelshorrors/old.php?l=en
- Innovative: Nationaal Historisch Museum / Museum of National History Nationnaal Historisch Museum / Museum of National History, designed in-house http://www.innl.nl
- Long Lived: Exploratorium Exploratorium.org, designed by varied http://www.exploratorium.org
- Mobile: The Museum of Modern Art AB EX NY iPAD APP, designed by Deep Focus http://www.moma.org/explore/mobile/abexnyapp
- Mobile (Honorable Mention): California Academy of Sciences Golden Gate Park Field Guide, designed by Odopod https://web.archive.org/web/20120106232816/http://calacademy.org/apps/ggp/
- Museum Professional: Smithsonian Institution Smithsonian Web and New Media Strategy Wiki, designed in-house http://smithsonian-webstrategy.wikispaces.com
- Research / Online Collection: The British Museum Portable Antiquities Scheme, designed by Daniel Pett http://finds.org.uk
- Social Media: Tate One-to-one with the Artist: Ai Weiwei, designed by Cogapp http://aiweiwei.tate.org.uk/
- Social Media (Honorable Mention): The Museum of Modern Art Andy Warhol: Motion Pictures, designed by Stamen http://MoMA.org/screentests
- Small: County Museum, Dundalk ASI: Archaeology Scene Investigations in North County Louth, designed by MOR Solutions http://www.asi-louth.ie/
- People's Choice: Smithsonian Institution Smithsonian Web and New Media Strategy Wiki, designed in-house http://smithsonian-webstrategy.wikispaces.com
- Best Overall: Australian Centre for the Moving Image ACMI Generator, by Monkii https://web.archive.org/web/20120214044545/http://generator.acmi.net.au/
- Special Community Award: Spinny Bar Historical Society SBHS, designed "in-house" http://www.spinnybarhistoricalsociety.org/

=== 2010 ===
- Education: Museum of Modern Art Meet Me: The MoMA's Alzheimer's Project, designed in-house http://www.moma.org/meetme
- Exhibition (Honorable Mention): Historical Society of Pennsylvania PhilaPlace, designed by Night Kitchen Interactive http://www.philaplace.org/
- Exhibition: Museum of Modern Art Bauhaus: Workshops for Modernity 1919-1933, designed by Hello Design https://web.archive.org/web/20120423044459/http://www.moma.org/bauhaus
- Innovative/Experimental: Royal Observatory Greenwich Solar Stormwatch, designed in-house http://solarstormwatch.com/
- Long-lived: Culture24 Culture24, designed by Culture24 and System Simulation Limited http://www.culture24.org.uk/
- Museum Professional: Museum Marketing https://web.archive.org/web/20120502204447/http://museummarketing.org/
- Podcast: National Museum of Australia National Museum of Australia's Audio on demand program, designed by Icelab http://www.nma.gov.au/audio/
- Research: Victoria and Albert Museum V&A Search the Collection, designed by The Other Media https://collections.vam.ac.uk/
- Social Media: Museo Picasso de Barcelona Museo Picasso Online Community, designed in-house http://www.bcn.cat/museupicasso/en/get-involved/online-community.html
- Small: Dulwich Picture Gallery Dulwich OnView, designed in-house http://www.dulwichonview.org.uk/
- People's Choice: National September 11 Memorial & Museum Make History, designed by Local Projects http://911history.org/
- Best Overall: Indianapolis Museum of Art ArtBabble, designed in-house http://www.artbabble.org/

=== 2009 ===
- Online Exhibition: Click! A Crowd-Curated Exhibition http://www.brooklynmuseum.org/exhibitions/click
- Educational: Tate Kids http://kids.tate.org.uk/
- Education (Honorable Mention): Firefly Watch, Museum of Science, Boston https://www.mos.org/fireflywatch/
- Museum Professional's: CODART.nl http://www.codart.nl
- Research: Museum of Jewish Heritage Online Collection http://collection.mjhnyc.org
- Online Community or Service: Brooklyn Museum Collection, Posse, and Tag! You are It! http://www.brooklynmuseum.org/opencollection/collections/
- Online Community or Service (Honorable Mention): Flickr Commons https://www.flickr.com/commons and Indicommons https://web.archive.org/web/20120228172506/http://www.indicommons.org/
- Podcast (Audio, Video): RWM (Radio web MACBA) http://rwm.macba.cat
- Innovative or Experimental: My Yard Our Message http://myyardourmessage.com/
- Innovative or Experimental (Honorable Mention) Astronomy Photographer of the Year (plus complimentary digital astronomy services) https://web.archive.org/web/20170421004616/http://www.adrianmactaggart.co.uk/work/web/astrophoto/
- Small: Museum 2.0 https://museumtwo.blogspot.com/
- People's Choice: Video Active Video Active, designed by the Video Active Project http://videoactive.wordpress.com/workplan-2/
- Best Overall: Brooklyn Museum Collection http://www.brooklynmuseum.org/

=== 2008 ===
- Exhibition: The American Image: The Photographs of John Collier Jr. https://web.archive.org/web/20160303172725/http://americanimage.unm.edu/
- Exhibition Honorable Mention: The Digital Vaults http://www.digitalvaults.org
- Educational: Great Chicago Stories, Chicago History Museum https://web.archive.org/web/20161221092603/http://www.greatchicagostories.org/
- Museum Professional's: ExhibitFiles, Association of Science-Technology Centers https://web.archive.org/web/20100214152434/http://www.exhibitfiles.org/
- Museum Professional's Honorable Mention: The IMA Dashboard, Indianapolis Museum of Art https://web.archive.org/web/20160303204512/http://dashboard.imamuseum.org/
- Research: Prints and Printmaking, Australia, Asia, Pacific https://web.archive.org/web/20130302182605/http://www.printsandprintmaking.gov.au/catalogues/work.aspx?
- Online Community or Service: My Brighton and Hove http://www.mybrightonandhove.org.uk
- Online Community or Service (Honorable Mention): Brooklyn Museum of Art Community, Brooklyn Museum of Art https://web.archive.org/web/20140305195115/http://www.brooklynmuseum.org/community/
- Podcast (Audio, Video): Roman Art from the Louvre Webisodes, Indianapolis Museum of Art https://web.archive.org/web/20100224061009/http://www.theromansarecoming.com/webisodes
- Podcast (Audio, Video) Honorable Mention: TateShots, Tate https://web.archive.org/web/20081011203916/http://tate.org.uk/tateshots/
- Innovative or Experimental: Launchball, Science Museum, London http://www.sciencemuseum.org.uk/launchball
- Innovative or Experimental (Honorable Mention) Astronomy Photographer of the Year (plus complimentary digital astronomy services) http://www.rmg.co.uk/discover/astronomy-photographer-gallery
- People's Choice: Maps: Tools for Adventure, The Children's Museum of Indianapolis (in conjunction with the National Geographic Society) https://web.archive.org/web/20090626085547/http://www.nationalgeographic.com/education/toolsforadventure/
- Best Overall: Launchball, Science Museum, London http://www.sciencemuseum.org.uk/launchball

=== 2007 ===
- Online Exhibition: Rembrandt-Caravaggio Webspecial http://www.brooklynmuseum.org/exhibitions/click
- Online Exhibition Honorable Mention: Caught & Coloured
- Educational: Stagework https://web.archive.org/web/20160205060918/http://www.stagework.org.uk/
- Museum Professional's: Collections Link https://web.archive.org/web/20140622092324/http://www.collectionslink.org.uk/
- Research: Discover Nikkei http://www.discovernikkei.org
- Innovative or Experimental: SFMOMA ArtCasts https://web.archive.org/web/20081021025016/http://www.sfmoma.org/podcasts/
- Best Overall: Stagework https://web.archive.org/web/20160205060918/http://www.stagework.org.uk/

=== 2006 ===
- Online Exhibition: Curating the City - Wilshire Boulevard http://www.curatingthecity.org
- Online Exhibition Honorable Mention: Monticello Explorer http://explorer.monticello.org
- E-Services or E-Commerce Site: Minnesota Historical Society (MHS) Online Store http://shop.mnhs.org
- Educational: Life of a Rock Star http://collectionscanada.ca/rock/index2-e.html
- Educational Honorable Mention: Palaeography: Reading old handwriting, 1500-1800 http://www.nationalarchives.gov.uk/palaeography
- Museum Professional's: International Council of African Museums (AFRICOM) https://web.archive.org/web/20150510064937/http://www.africom.museum/
- Research: NYPL Digital Gallery http://digitalgallery.nypl.org/nypldigital/index.cfm
- Research Honorable Mention: Birds in Backyards http://www.birdsinbackyards.net/
- Innovative or Experimental: Science Buzz http://www.smm.org/buzz
- Small Museum: Waterford County Image Archive http://www.waterfordcountyimages.org
- Best Overall: Science Buzz http://www.smm.org/buzz
