= Carla Gannis =

American painter

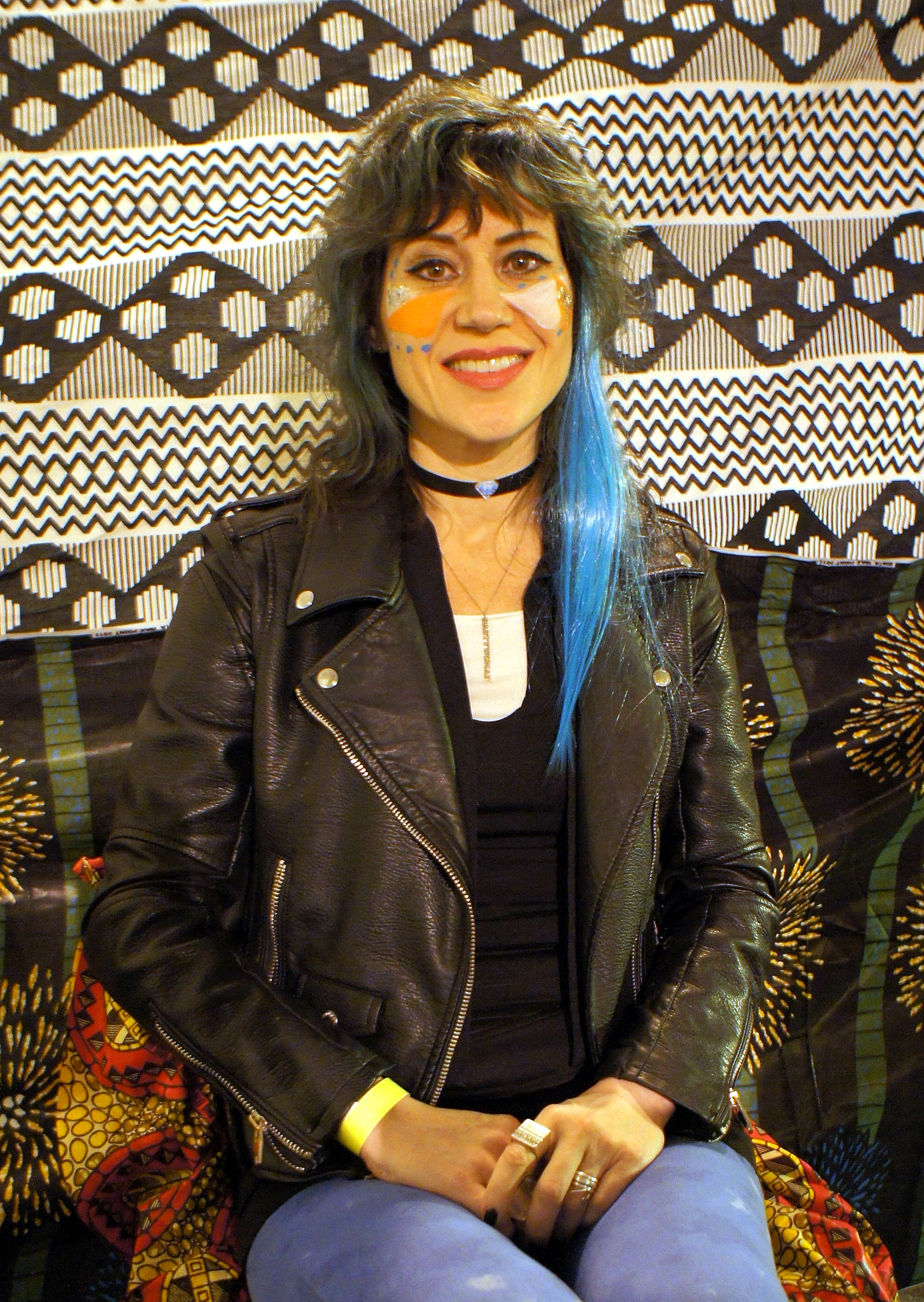
- Carla Gannis at Past and Future Fictions at MoMA PS1 in the VW Dome with Art + Feminism
- Born: 1970 (age 55–56); Oxford, North Carolina, United States
- Education: University of North Carolina at Greensboro, Boston University
- Known for: Transmedia art, Digital art, Contemporary art
- Notable work: The Garden of Emoji Delights (2013)
- Website: carlagannis.com

Carla Gannis (born 1970) is an American transmedia artist based in New York and professor at the Pratt Institute in the Department of Digital Arts until 2019 when she joined New York University. Her works combine digital imagery with well-known works of art such as paintings by Pieter Bruegel the Elder. She received widespread attention in 2013 for her emoji version of Hieronymus Bosch's painting The Garden of Earthly Delights.

== Biography ==
=== Early life ===
Carla Gannis was born and raised in Oxford, North Carolina. Gannis attended the University of North Carolina Greensboro, where she received her BFA degree in painting. She then continued her education at Boston University, moving north to a much larger city in the hope of expanding her horizons and technical skills. It was at Boston University that she received her MFA degree in painting.

=== Career ===
In the early 1990s, Gannis began shifting her focus from painting and began to implement digital aspects into her works. Since 2003, she has had 20 solo exhibitions, many of which carry her common conceptual elements of power, sexuality, and storytelling. Throughout her artistic career, Gannis has used new concepts and media with the changes in surrounding technologies. Gannis lives in Brooklyn, New York and worked as a professor and assistant chairperson at The Department of Digital Arts at the Pratt Institute, when she joined New York University. In 2019, she contributed to produce a chapter based on an interview about her work in the book Museums and Digital Culture.

== Works ==
- 1997- Wall Samples, Mixed Media, Dimensions variable
- 1997- Little White Lies, Digitally Printed Poster, 16x20 inches
- 1998- Average Rage, Digital C-Prints, 7×9 inches
- 1998- Equestrian, Digital C-Print, 8.5×11 inches
- 1998- Punctum, Digital C-Prints, 8x10 inches
- 1999- Scandals Postcards, Mixed Media, 4x5 inches
- 1999- Here, Video, Wall Relief, Sound Installation, Dimensions Variable
- 1999- Measure, 6 Digital Pigment Prints with whiteout, 8x10 inches
- 1999- Crescent Series, Digital C-Prints, 13x16 inches
- 2000- James Bond Series, Video Stills from Playing Smart, J.a.n.e., Wild Things
- 2000- 6-minute Video Animation
- 2001- <2 6 minute Video Animation
- 2001- Mobilux 4RT, 6-minute Video Animation
- 2001–2002- Transmit 1 0, Animate Video and Sound Sculpture, 15 minutes
- 2002–2004- Transmit 1 0, Digital Pigment Prints, 8x8 inches

=== Projects ===
- Travelogue- 2002–2004, digital pigment prints
- I Dream of Jeannie Emerging from a Fresca Bottle- 2005, wall painting acrylic and digital collage, digital pigment prints
- Everything That Rises Must Converge- 2006, digital pigment print
- Jezebel- 2008, digital pigment print, c-print on aluminium with Plexiglas
- What's Not on My Mind- 2009–2010, mixed media, digital drawings, digital C-prints

Smart Device/Multiple Exposures- 2011, digital pigment prints

“Smart Devices/Multiple Exposures” is a digital pigment print created by Carla Gannis in 2011. Carla utilizes one small handheld device to employ nine separate interfaces and displays. Carla began this project by checking the time, then she shot video, took photographs, tracked her geographical position, played a game, spoke on the telephone, composed emails, sent texts and instant messages, all in a span of thirty minutes or less. All in all, this project was meant to turn activity into form by mashing up the interface with images, mixing font with philosophy and GPS with sublimity, to find and reveal “mystic truths.”

- Robbi Carni Project- 15-foot digital drawing, character drawings inspired by collaboration with Pseudonymous Twitter writers
- The Multiversal Hippozoonomadon & Prismenagerie- 2012, digital pigment print
- Legend Legend- 2013, collaborative project of poems and drawings based on text redactions of the Book of Earths by Edna Kenton

Non-Facial Recognition- 2011-ongoing, digital pigment prints and editions of 5

Many times, people's images appear without permission on someone else’s Facebook page, website, or other social media site. Gannis explores the issues of trust, identity, and intrusion regarding the lack of privacy people have because of the Internet. In her experiment "facial recognition subversion," she asked her Twitter network to send her their profile photos so she could “scramble” the images in order to create new identities and make faces unrecognizable to their owners. With this experiment, Gannis’s Twitter followers place their trust in her, similar to what humans do every day in the digital world.

The Garden of Emoji Delights, 2013–2014, digital pigment prints, videos, and 3D

Gannis reconstructs Hieronymus Bosch’s famous triptych for the digital era while redefining identity and its forms of representation, both virtually and physically. She replaces the religious elements of the triptych with contemporary symbols, otherwise known as emojis. This digital collage explores modern society by using popular iconography in today’s world. Gannis chooses symbols that are popular and widely used today, which compares to the religious symbols that were prevalent in society when the original artwork was created.

The physical work resides in the Kasia Kay Gallery in Chicago, but there is also a digital version that debuted in New York City, New York in October 2014. This video is a large-scale animated projection looped on 12 screens.

A Subject Self-Defined- 2015–2016, video installations and book

“\ˈgü-gəl\ Results *in progress” created by Carla Gannis, is a work of performance videos, Vines, and laser engravings in which she uses Google as her main focus. For over a year and a half, Carla has been searching string phrases on Google and publishing them on social networks as a way to share her thoughts as well as the mind that exists within her “Googlesphere.” She has created a public Google document for people to view her growing compilation of Google searches. In one of her videos called “In Search Of (Self Portrait Study 01 for \ˈgü-gəl\ Results Project),” she appears on the screen while her very own Google results stream over her face in order from 0 to 1,000,000 and beyond. Each result is color-coded according to Komar and Melamid’s favorite color results for the United States.
The Selfie Drawings is an augmented reality experience available in part as a book (hardback and digital edition). The project is a collaboration between Carla Gannis, the arts collective UNBOX's #BehindTheFace project and Blippar AR technologies.

== Exhibitions ==
=== Solo exhibitions ===
- 2008: Jezebel, Boulder Museum of Contemporary Art, Boulder, CO.
- 2012: The Multiversal Hippozoonomadon & Prismenagerie, Pablo's Birthday Gallery, New York, NY.
- 2016: A Subject Self-Defined, TRANSFER Gallery, Brooklyn, NY
- 2022-2023: wunderkammer, Pérez Art Museum Miami, Florida

=== Group exhibitions ===
- 2015: TechNoBody, Pelham Art Center, New York, NY.
- 2016: Monsters and the Machine, Laboral Centro de Arte, Prados, Gijón, Spain
- 2023: FILE (Electronic Language International Festival), Rio de Janeiro, Brazil
