= Brooklyn Look =

Design style originating from Brooklyn, New York City

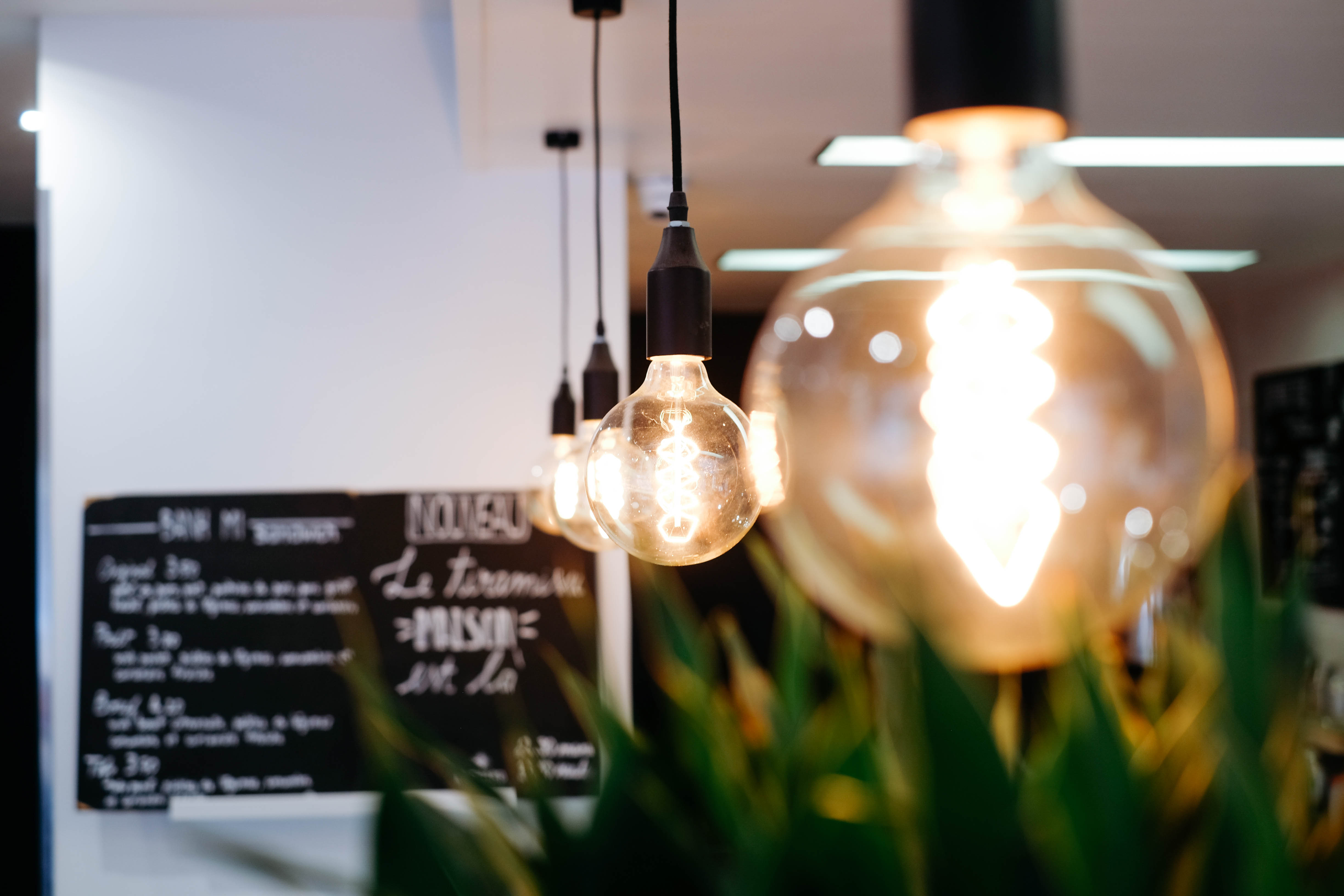
Exposed Edison light bulbs form one of the aspects of the Brooklyn Look in restaurants

The Brooklyn Look is a design style that is used in fields such as interior design, food packaging and greeting cards which originated from Brooklyn, New York City.

== Characteristics ==
During an interview with Interior Design, design firm co-owner Joan Michaels stated that the Brooklyn Look consists of reclaimed wood, exposed lightbulbs and taxidermy. The style was once an independent expression of the reuse of goods but has changed into expensive consumer products. Many business owners believe that using the Brooklyn Look is good for increasing profits.

== Prevalence ==
In a Quartz article, it was noted that the Brooklyn Look was commonly used in neighborhoods like Pantin in Paris, Shimokitazawa in Tokyo, Florentin in Tel Aviv and Shoreditch in East London.
