= Visitor Studies =

- Discipline: Visitor studies
- Language: English
- Edited by: Karen Knutson, Kevin Crowley

Publication details
- History: Since 1998
- Publisher: Routledge
- Frequency: Biannual

Standard abbreviations
- ISO 4: Visit. Stud.

Indexing
- ISSN: 1064-5578 (print); 1934-7715 (web)

Links
- Journal homepage; Online access; Online archive

Visitor Studies is a biannual peer-reviewed academic journal covering visitor research, including reflections on the area, research methodologies, and theoretical aspects. The journal covers subjects relating to museums and learning in the context of historic sites, nature centers, parks, visitor centers, and zoos. It is interdisciplinary in nature, including humanities, business management, and social sciences. The journal was established in 1998 and is published by Routledge. The editors-in-chief are Karen Knutson and Kevin Crowley (University of Pittsburgh).

The journal is under the auspices of the Visitor Studies Association.

== Abstracting and indexing ==
The journal is abstracted and indexed in:

- Applied Social Sciences Index & Abstracts
- EBSCO databases
- Scopus
- Emerging Sources Citation Index
