= Archives & Museum Informatics =

Archives & Museum Informatics is a company based in Toronto, Ontario, Canada (and previously Pittsburgh, USA), that organizes conferences, and undertakes consulting, publishing and training in the field of cultural heritage, especially for museums.

Archives & Museum Informatics was led by David Bearman (1950-2023) and Jennifer Trant. The latter is Editor-in-Chief of the associated Archives and Museum Informatics journal published by Springer.

The company founded and organized the annual Museums and the Web and ICHIM (International Cultural Heritage Informatics Meeting) conferences until 2011. It publishes conference proceedings, educational materials, research reports and articles. It organizes workshops and seminars on the management of electronic records, virtual libraries and archives, multimedia and interactive publishing, intellectual property management and electronic information standards. Residential seminars are organized on Grindstone Island, Big Rideau Lake, in the Rideau Canal System. The company offers consultancy for archives, museums, libraries and cultural heritage organizations relating to information technology issues.

As a member of the steve.museum steering committee, from 2005 to 2008 Archives & Museum Informatics spearheaded an experiment in art museum digital image cataloging by allowing the public to introduce new search-terms to the formal catalog.

== Museums and the Web ==
Archives & Museum Informatics founded and organized the Museums and the Web international conference from 1997 to 2011. The conference considers the interdisciplinary museological field of how museums and their users can benefit from the use of the World Wide Web.

== ICHIM ==
The annual International Cultural Heritage Informatics Meeting conference (ICHIM) is organized by Archives & Museums Informatics. It was normally held in Europe, especially Paris, and covered digital culture and heritage. It included a proceedings. The last meeting was held in 2007.

== See also ==
- Archives and Museum Informatics journal
