= Jonathan Bowen =

British computer scientist (born 1956)

Jonathan P. Bowen FBCS FRSA
- Born: 14 March 1956 (age 70); Oxford, England
- Education: University College, Oxford
- Known for: Formal methods, Z notation, Virtual Library museums pages, Virtual Museum of Computing
- Awards: IEE Charles Babbage Premium (1994)
- Scientific career
- Fields: Computer science, Information Technology, Museum informatics
- Workplaces: Museophile Limited, Southwest University, Birmingham City University, London South Bank University, University of Reading, University of Oxford, Imperial College, London
- Website: jpbowen.com

Jonathan P. Bowen (born March 14, 1956) is a British computer scientist and an Emeritus Professor at London South Bank University. His main contribution has been in formal methods, especially the Z notation. In addition, he has worked in the area of museum informatics, including the creation of the Virtual Library museums pages, an early web directory. His contributions also include works on the history of computing, especially Alan Turing.

== Background and education ==
Jonathan Bowen was born in 1956 in Oxford, England. He is the son of Humphry Bowen, a chemist and botanist. Bowen attended the Dragon School and Bryanston School before matriculating at University College, Oxford. He earned a Master of Arts degree in Engineering Science from Oxford University.

== Academic career ==
Following his graduation, Bowen initially worked in the software industry before transitioning into academia. He has held academic positions at several institutions, including: Imperial College London; Oxford University Computing Laboratory (now the Department of Computer Science); University of Reading; and London South Bank University (where he is an Emeritus Professor). At London South Bank University, he served as head of the Centre for Applied Formal Methods from 2000 to 2006. Bowen has also been an adjunct professor at Southwest University in Chongqing, China, since 2017. Additionally, he has held visiting positions at the Pratt Institute in New York City, the University of Westminster, King's College London, and University College London.

== Research and contributions ==
Formal methods and Z notation

Bowen has been active in formal methods, particularly the Z notation, a formal specification language used in software engineering to describe and model systems precisely. He served as Chair of the Z User Group from the early 2000s until 2011 and was elected Chair of the British Computer Society's FACS (Formal Aspects of Computing Science) Specialist Group in 2002, a position that he held until 2025. From 2005 onwards, he was Associate Editor-in-Chief of Innovations in Systems and Software Engineering, and on the editorial board of ACM Computing Surveys, focusing on formal methods and software engineering.

Museum informatics and digital culture

In addition to his technical work, Bowen has made contributions to museum informatics, virtual museums, and more generally digital culture. He founded the Virtual Library museums pages (VLmp) in 1994, an early online directory of museums that was adopted by the International Council of Museums (ICOM). He also founded Museophile Limited in 2002, a company dedicated to supporting museums and online cultural heritage initiatives.

History of computing

Bowen has also authored works on the history of computing, with particular emphasis on Alan Turing and early computer pioneers. He also established the Virtual Museum of Computing, an early virtual museum in the 1990s.

Industry experience

Bowen has worked with several technology companies during his career, including Altran Praxis, Logica, Marconi Instruments, Oxford Instruments, and Silicon Graphics.

== Honours and recognition ==
- 1994: Received the IEE Charles Babbage Premium for the best paper in the Software Engineering Journal
- 2002: Elected Fellow of the Royal Society for the Encouragement of Arts, Manufactures & Commerce (RSA)
- 2004: Elected Fellow of the British Computer Society (BCS)
- He has been a Liveryman of the Worshipful Company of Information Technologists and a Freeman of the City of London.

== Selected books ==
Jonathan Bowen has written and edited a number of books, including:

- Bowen, J.P., editor, Towards Verified Systems. Elsevier Science, Real-Time Safety Critical Systems series, volume 2, 1994. ISBN 0-444-89901-4.
- Hinchey, M.G. and Bowen, J.P., editors, Applications of Formal Methods. Prentice Hall International Series in Computer Science, 1995. ISBN 0-13-366949-1.
- Bowen, J.P., Formal Specification and Documentation using Z: A Case Study Approach. International Thomson Computer Press, International Thomson Publishing, 1996. ISBN 1-85032-230-9.
- Bowen, J.P. and Hinchey, M.G., editors, High-Integrity System Specification and Design. Springer-Verlag, London, FACIT series, 1999. ISBN 3-540-76226-4.
- Hinchey, M.G. and Bowen, J.P., editors, Industrial-Strength Formal Methods in Practice. Springer-Verlag, London, FACIT series, 1999. ISBN 1-85233-640-4.
- Hierons, R., Bowen, J.P., and Harman, M., editors, Formal Methods and Testing. Springer-Verlag, LNCS, Volume 4949, 2008. ISBN 978-3-540-78916-1.
- Börger, E., Butler, M., Bowen, J.P., and Boca, P., editors, Abstract State Machines, B and Z. Springer-Verlag, LNCS, Volume 5238, 2008. ISBN 978-3-540-87602-1.
- Boca, P.P., Bowen, J.P., and Siddiqi, J.I., editors, Formal Methods: State of the Art and New Directions. Springer, 2010. ISBN 978-1-84882-735-6, e-ISBN 978-1-84882-736-3, doi:10.1007/978-1-84882-736-3.
- Bowen, J.P., Keene, S., and Ng, K., editors, Electronic Visualisation in Arts and Culture. Springer Series on Cultural Computing, Springer, 2013. ISBN 978-1-4471-5406-8.
- Copeland, J., Bowen, J.P., Sprevak, M., Wilson, R., et al., The Turing Guide. Oxford University Press, 2017. ISBN 978-0198747826 (hardcover), ISBN 978-0198747833 (paperback).
- Hinchey, M.G., Bowen, J.P., Olderog, E.-R., editors, Provably Correct Systems. Springer International Publishing, NASA Monographs in Systems and Software Engineering series, 2017. ISBN 978-3-319-48627-7, doi:10.1007/978-3-319-48628-4.
- Giannini, T. and Bowen, J.P., editors, Museums and Digital Culture: New Perspectives and Research. Springer Series on Cultural Computing, Springer, 2019. ISBN 978-3-319-97456-9, e-ISBN 978-3-319-97457-6, doi:10.1007/978-3-319-97457-6.
- Giannini, T. and Bowen, J.P., editors, The Arts and Computational Culture: Real and Virtual Worlds. Springer Series on Cultural Computing, Springer, 2024. ISBN 978-3-031-53864-3, e-ISBN 978-3-031-53865-0, doi:10.1007/978-3-031-53865-0
