= John H. Falk =

John Howard Falk (born December 6, 1948) is Director of the Institute for Learning Innovation and Sea Grant Professor Emeritus of Free-Choice Learning at Oregon State University. He's a leading expert on "free-choice learning," learning guided by a person's needs and interests. At the Smithsonian Institution's Chesapeake Bay Center for Environmental Studies at Edgewater, Maryland, Falk spent over 13 years "studying lawns and how man relates to them." His current research focuses on the community impacts of museums, libraries, zoos, and aquariums; understanding the reasons people utilize free-choice learning settings during their spare time; and helping cultural institutions rethink their educational positioning in the contemporary era.

== Books ==
- Falk, J.H. (2021). "The Value of Museums: Enhancing Societal Well-Being" Lanham, MD: Rowman & Littlefield
- Falk, J.H. & Dierking L.D. (2018). "Learning from Museums, 2nd Edition" Lanham, MD: Rowman & Littlefield
- Falk, J.H. (2017). Born to Choose: Evolution, Self and Well-Being (Routledge).
- Falk, J.H. & Dierking, L.D. (2014). The Museum Experience Revisited. Walnut Creek, CA: Left Coast Press.
- Falk, J.H. (2009). Identity and the Museum Visitor Experience. Walnut Creek, CA: Left Coast Press.
- Falk, J.H., Heimlich, J.E., & Foutz, S. (eds.) (2009). Free-Choice Learning and the Environment. Lanham, MD: AltaMira Press.
- Falk, J.H., Bronnenkant, Vernon, C.L., & Heimlich, J.E., (2007). Visitor Evaluation Toolbox for Zoos and Aquariums. Silver Spring, MD: Association of Zoos & Aquariums.
- Yager, R. & Falk, J.H. (eds.) (2007). Exemplary Science Program: Informal Science Education. Washington, DC: National Science Teachers Association.
- Falk, J.H., Reinhard, E.M., Vernon, C.L., Bronnenkant, K., Deans, N.L., Heimlich, J.E., (2007). Why Zoos & Aquariums Matter: Assessing the Impact of a Visit. Silver Spring, MD: Association of Zoos & Aquariums.
- Falk, J.H., Dierking, L.D., & Foutz, S. (eds.) (2007) In Principle-In Practice: Museums as Learning Institutions. Lanham, MD: AltaMira Press.
- Stein, J., Dierking, L., Falk, J. & Ellenbogen, K. (eds.) (2006). Insights: A museum learning resource. Annapolis, MD: Institute for Learning Innovation. http://www.ilinet.org/ipip/In_Principle_In_Practice_Insights_-_A_Museum_Learning_Resource.pdf
- Falk, J.H. & Sheppard, B. (2006) Thriving in the Knowledge Age: New business models for museums and other cultural institutions. Lanham, MD: AltaMira Press.
- Caban, G., Scott, C., Falk, J.H. & Dierking, L.D. (2003) Museums and Creativity: A study into the role of museums in design education. Sydney, AU: Powerhouse Publishing.
- Falk, J.H. & Dierking, L.D. (2002) Lessons without Limit: How free-choice learning is transforming education. Lanham, MD: AltaMira Press.
- Falk, J.H. (Ed) (2001) Free-Choice Science Education: How We Learn Science Outside of School. New York, NY: Teacher's College Press, Columbia University.
- Falk, J.H. & Dierking, L.D. (2000) Learning from Museums: Visitor Experiences and the Making of Meaning. Lanham, MD: AltaMira Press.
- Falk, J.H. & Rosenberg, K. (1999). Bite-Sized Science. Chicago, IL: Chicago Review Press.
- Dierking, L.D., Falk, J.H., Holland, Fisher, S., Schatz, D. & Wilke, L. (1997). Collaborations: Critical Criteria for Success. Washington, DC: Association of Science-Technology Centers.
- Falk, J.H., Pruitt, R. II, Swift, K. & Katz, T. (1996). Bubble Monster and other science fun. Chicago, IL: Chicago Review Press.
- Falk, J.H. & Dierking, L.D. (Ed.) (1995). Public Institutions for Personal Learning: Establishing a Research Agenda. Washington, DC: American Association of Museums
- Falk, J.H. (1993) Factors Influencing Leisure Decisions: The Use of Museums by African Americans. Washington, DC: American Association of Museums.
- Falk, J.H. & Dierking, L.D. (1992). The Museum Experience. Washington, DC: Whalesback Books.
- Falk, J.H. (Ed.) (1989). Still More Smithsonian Science Activities New York: G.M.G. Publishing.
- Falk, J.H. (Ed.) (1988). More Smithsonian Science Activities New York: G.M.G. Publishing.
- Falk, J.H. (Ed.) (1987). Smithsonian Science Activities New York: G.M.G. Publishing.
- Falk, J.H. (1980). Lawn Guide. Nashua, N.H: Delta Publishing.
- Falk, J.H., Lawson, C. & Malone, L. (1973). The Lawn. Berkeley, CA: The Regents of the University of California, Berkeley. (out of print).

== Awards ==
- Distinguished Career Award, NARST: An worldwide organization for improving science teaching and learning through research (2016)
- Oregon State University, University Outreach and Engagement Vice Provost Award for Excellence, Innovation-Partnerships Award (2016)
- Council of Scientific Society Presidents Award for Educational Research (2013)
- Invited by the National Science Foundation to present one of its annual Distinguished Lectures (2013)
- Named by News Digest International as one of the "Who's Who" of Academia (2013, 2014)
- John Cotton Dana Award for Leadership, American Association of Museums (2010)
- Selected to American Association of Museums’ Centennial Honor Roll—one of 100 most influential individuals in the museum community, 1906-2006 (2006)
- Marquis Who's Who in America (2001, 2002, 2003, 2004, 2005, 2006, 2007, 2008, 2009, 2010, 2011, 2012, 2013, 2014, 2015)
