= John Cotton Dana Award =

Award by the American Library Association

The John Cotton Dana Library Public Relations Award, usually referred to as the John Cotton Dana Award, is an annual award given by Core: Leadership, Infrastructure, Futures, American Library Association for excellence in library public relations. It is named for John Cotton Dana, a Progressive Era librarian who strove to make libraries accessible to as many people as possible. This award has been given continuously since 1946 and is sponsored by EBSCO Information Services, the H.W. Wilson Foundation and the Library Leadership and Management Association (LLAMA), a division of the American Library Association (ALA). Eight winners receive a $10,000 prize and a plaque. The award is considered to be the ALA's most prestigious honor.

The John Cotton Dana Awards are presented at a reception hosted by EBSCO during the American Library Association's annual conference.

== History ==
The John Cotton Dana Award was created to replace the Wilson Publicity Honor Roll, a three-year plan sponsored by the H.W. Wilson Company and the ALA Public Relations Committee. The first Honor Roll recipients were named in 1940 and this inaugural class consisted of 52 libraries. The Honor Roll was awarded from 1940 to 1942. In 1942, at the ALA's Annual Conference in Milwaukee, the Public Relations Committee convinced the ALA Council that a new, permanent publicity award was necessary. Implementation of this new award was held off until the end of World War II.

Initially, two awards were presented: the John Cotton Dana Awards and the John Cotton Dana Special Awards. These two awards were combined into a single award beginning with the 1996 winners. The awards were streamlined to eliminate any misconceptions that the Special Award was a less significant honor.

=== Notable Award Recipients ===
The Savannah State College Library under the leadership of E. J. Josey won the award in 1962 and 1964, for the Great Book Discussion Group and the Library Lecture Series, two programs which "attracted large numbers of whites into the Savannah State College campus for the first time".

Previous recipients of the John Cotton Dana Award for Leadership include John H. Falk and Lynn Dierking, Oregon State University and the Institute for Learning Innovation; Marian Godfrey, Director of the Culture Programs, The Pew Charitable Trusts, Philadelphia; Diane Frankel, Institute of Library and Museum Services; Marlene Chambers, Director, Publications, Denver Art Museum; Joel Bloom, Director, Franklin Institute Science Museum, Philadelphia, PA; three-time recipient Grant Kaiser, Calgary Public Library; and Michael Spock, Director, Boston Children’s Museum.

== Criteria ==
The award is open to all libraries. Previous winners have included public libraries, school libraries, special libraries, and academic libraries. Entry documents are available through EBSCO. Entries are judged on the criteria of Needs Assessment and Planning, Implementation, and Evaluation. Each of the five judges are previous winners of the award.
