= List of Singaporean inventions and discoveries =

This is a list of Singaporean inventions and discoveries.

== Food, food techniques and cuisine ==
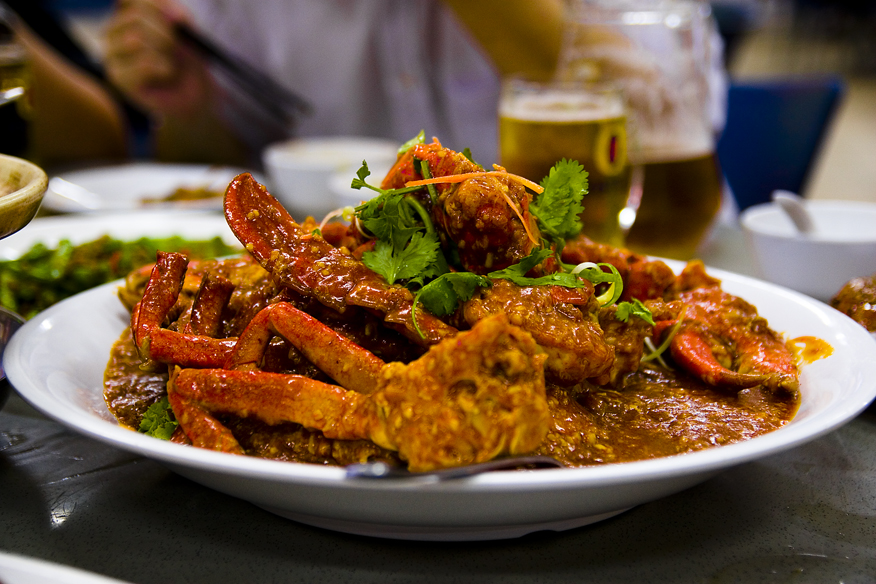
Chilli crab

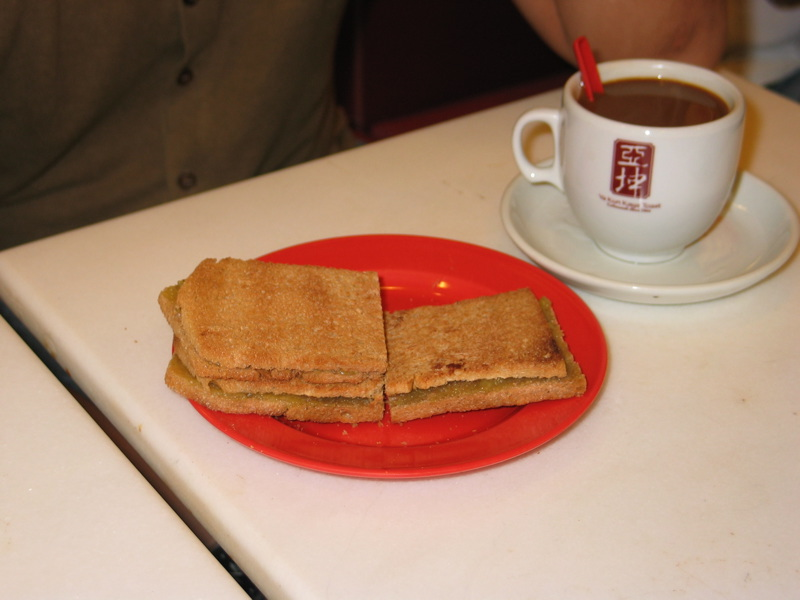
Kaya toast

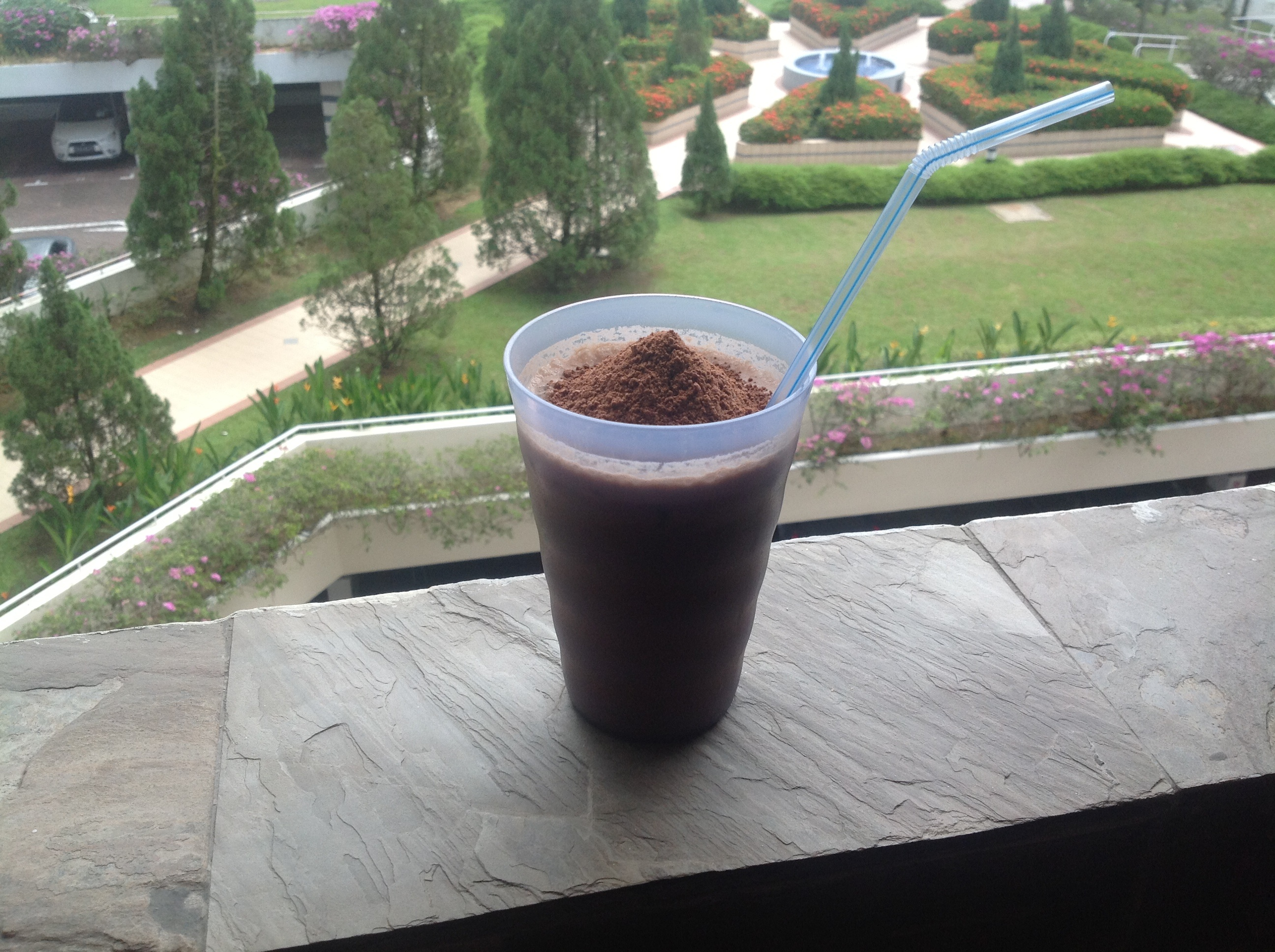
Milo dinosaur

=== Food ===
- Bak chor mee, which translates to minced meat noodles, is a Singaporean noodle dish common in hawker centres. The noodles are tossed in vinegar, minced meat, pork slices, pork liver, stewed sliced mushrooms, meat balls and bits of deep-fried lard. The dish can be categorised into two variants: a dry version and a soup version. Most dry versions come with slices of stewed mushroom, minced pork, slices of lean pork and sometimes fried anchovies, atop noodles tossed in a chilli-vinegar sauce, while soup versions include a pork flavoured broth.
- Chilli crab is considered one of Singapore's national dishes, it was invented in 1956 by a Singaporean couple and was originally sold from a push cart. In 1963, another famous chef adapted the dish into a sourer version which became the common version seen in Singapore.
- Hainanese chicken rice, also considered one of Singapore's national dishes. It was first invented by Hainanese immigrants in Singapore during the 1920s.
- Kaya toast is a well known Singaporean snack commonly eaten during breakfast or afternoon tea.
- Katong laksa is a Singaporean variant of the spicy noodle soup laksa inspired by people who live in the precinct of Katong located in eastern Singapore.

=== Drink ===
- Kopi is a type of traditional coffee originating from Singapore. Invented in the early 20th century at the now Downtown Core such as Chinatown, it is a highly caffeinated black coffee served with condensed milk. It is usually consumed with kaya toast, another Singaporean dish. Several different forms of kopi exist, most notably: kopi O, coffee with no added milk; and kopi C, coffee with added evaporated milk. These are the terms used by local Singaporeans to refer to different coffee orders in kopitiams around the country.
- The Singapore Sling is a gin-based sling cocktail invented in 1915 by Singaporean bartender Ngiam Tong Boon at the Raffles Hotel in Singapore.
- Milo dinosaur is a Singaporean chocolate malt–based beverage most commonly found in hawker centres.

== Science and technology ==
=== Audio technology ===
- Sound Blaster, invented by Sim Wong Hoo and his company Creative Technology (known as Creative Labs in the United States).

=== Medicinal technology ===
- The ARCT-021 vaccine for COVID-19, developed by Singaporean scientists at the Duke–NUS Medical School.

=== Visual technology ===
- Virtual museums were first invented by Lin Hsin Hsin at the Lin Hsin Hsin Art Museum in 1994. At the time, its technology was considered the first of its kind during the initial expansion of the World Wide Web.

=== Agricultural ===
Singapore is a land-scarce country, and so, it is dependent on imports. Vertical farming platforms hopes to improve Singapore's situation.

== See also ==
- Culture of Singapore
- History of typography in East Asia
- List of Chinese discoveries
- List of Chinese inventions
- List of Japanese inventions and discoveries
- List of Korean inventions and discoveries
- List of Taiwanese inventions and discoveries
- List of Vietnamese inventions and discoveries
