= ArtCyclopedia =

Online database of information related to fine art

Artcyclopedia is an online database of museum-quality fine art founded by Canadian John Malyon.

== Information ==
The Artcyclopedia only deals with art that can be viewed online, and indexes 2,300 art sites (from museums and galleries), with links to around 180,000 artworks by 8,500 artists. The site has also started to compile a list of art galleries and auction houses.

== See also ==
- The Artchive
- Web Gallery of Art
- WebMuseum
