= Museu de Memes =

- Location: Brazil
- Type: Virtual museum
- President: Viktor Chagas
- Website: museudememes.com.br

The Museu de Memes (literally "Meme Museum") is a project of the Fluminense Federal University that, among other activities, presents a virtual museum whose collection serves as a reference for researchers interested in investigating the universe of memes, humor and the practices of constructing identities and representations in virtual communities. The project is considered the first meme museum in Brazil and was created by university professor Viktor Chagas, also bringing together students and faculty from the course and postgraduate students in communication at UERJ.

Seeing a meme on the wall of a museum: this provocation has always been our intention. (...) We want people to see the object of the meme as something relevant, avoiding the fuss, the nonsense, the chaos.

— Viktor Chagas, from the Institute of Art and Social Communication at UFF

In addition to the website itself, the project also focuses on providing guidance on research projects, scientific initiation and technological innovation across its thematic lines.
