= Mobile Phone Museum =

Non-profit collection established in 2021

- Mobile Phone Museum Logo
- Established: 2021
- Location: Virtual museum
- Type: Technology museum
- Accreditation: Registered Charity
- Collections: Mobile phones
- Collection size: 5000+
- Founders: Ben Wood, Matt Chatterley
- Website: mobilephonemuseum.com

The Mobile Phone Museum is a virtual museum curating mobile phones and a nonprofit organisation aimed at archiving and preserving mobile technology and increasing educational outreach about developments and innovations in the mobile industry. It has been described as the "world's most extensive mobile phone museum".

== History ==
The museum was founded by Ben Wood and Matt Chatterley, and officially launched at an event in London in November 2021. It is supported through a five-year sponsorship agreement with Vodafone. At launch the museum consisted of more than 2000 unique devices from 200 different manufacturers, spanning from early developments in mobile phones to the latest models.

The museum has plans to develop travelling exhibitions to showcase the collection to science, technology and design museums, and to schools.
