= WebMuseum =

French virtual museum

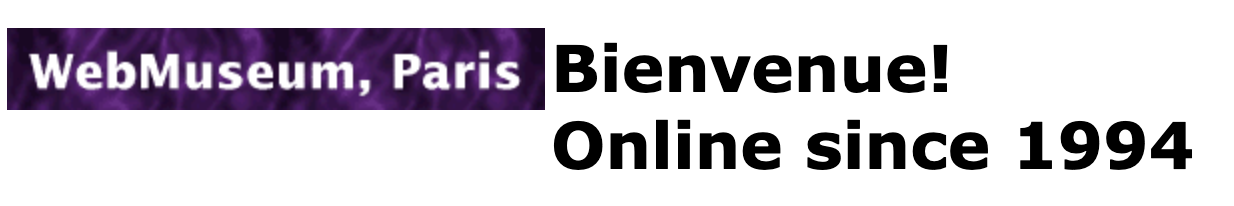
- Former name: Initial name was “Virtual Louvre” in March 1994. Later changed to "WebLouvre" in July 1994. In 1995, changed to "WebMuseum.
- Website type: Virtual museum
- Available in: Originally French, then changed to English
- Founded: 1994; 32 years ago
- Country of origin: France
- Founder: Nicolas Pioch
- Website: www.ibiblio.org/wm/
- Registration: None
- Current status: Live

The WebMuseum, formerly known as Virtual Louvre and WebLouvre, was an early art-related website.

The WebMuseum was founded by Nicolas Pioch in France in 1994, while he was a student. It is one of the earliest examples of a virtual museum. The site won the 1994 Best of the Web award for the "Best Use of Multiple Media" at CERN WWW conference.

When the actual Louvre became aware of the original WebLouvre's existence, it was forced to change its name to the WebMuseum. Pioch then eventually transferred the site’s database to the University of North Carolina and the Tokyo University of Science. Later, Pioch changed the language of the site to English.

However, many mirror sites were established throughout the world (including websites located in Brazil, Hungary, Singapore, Mexico, Norway, Poland, Russia, UK and the United States), making it impossible to eradicate it entirely. The mirror sites provides a resource of, at that time, high resolution art images and information for users across the world, although it is no longer actively updated.

Webmuseum organizes its collection both alphabetically by artist and thematically by artistic movement. The site provides educators and students with a large number of visual reproduction of artworks, contributing to the foundation for the extensive digital archives and virtual museum tours.

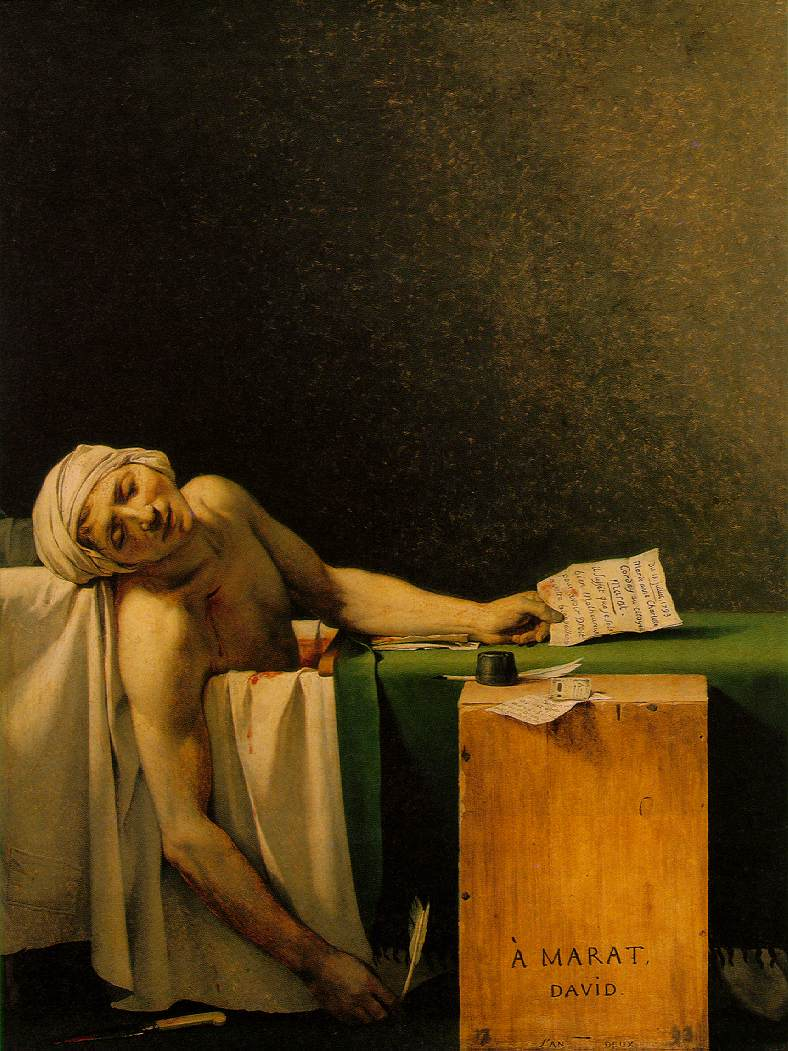
Image of The Death of Marat by Jacques-Louis David, originally installed on the WebMuseum by Mark Harden and Carol Gerten-Jackson

== Background: Rise of the virtual museum ==
The idea of a "virtual museum"，a collection of art accessible outside the bounds of a physical gallery, has conceptual roots in the mid-20th century. French theorist André Malraux famously imagined a“museum without walls,” an unlimited assemblage of art reproductions that no traditional museum could ever physically house. With the rise of the World Wide Web in the 1990s, institutions and individuals began experimenting with the internet as a medium for digital exhibition and public engagement. The spread of user-friendly web browsers, such as Mosaic in 1993, made it feasible to display images and multimedia to anyone online, this period marked a transformative phase for museums outreaches.

One of the defining characteristics of this first wave of museum websites was the adaptation of new technologies such as open-access databases, hyperlinking, and early forms of multimedia content. The concept “virtual” was of great importance to the digital development of those years, likely originating from the build-up about the first Virtual Reality applications wave starting from the late 1980s to the early 1990s.

=== Initial skepticism and gradual adoption from museums ===
Museum institution initially approached online platforms cautiously. Especially in France, institutions' concerns included the potential for reduced physical attendance and the challenge of adapting traditional curatorial practices to the digital realm. However, French museums were among the early adopters of the internet, establishing online presences even when the general public had limited exposure to digital technologies. This proactive approach was driven by a recognition of the internet's potential to broaden access to art and cultural heritage.

Science and technology museums started the transition smoothly due to their existing technical expertise. For example, the Exploratorium science museum in San Francisco launched a website in December 1993, at a time when only a few hundred websites existed globally. The Natural History Museum of Los Angeles County was among the pioneering institutions to establish a significant online presence, as evidenced by its early adoption of the domain, a coveted web address for natural history museums globally. Similarly, the Museum of the History of Science in Oxford occupies a historically significant building—the Old Ashmolean, constructed in 1683 as the world's first purpose-built museum. Leveraging the technological infrastructure and expertise available within the university setting, the museum was able to launch its website relatively early.

Art museums, on the other hand, hesitant to start their own official website, with problems possibly arose following online image copyrights and image quality. Museums questioned whether sharing images online might violate artists’ or museums’ rights. Though most were hesitant to set up their website, the Smithsonian Institution and the University of California Museum of Paleontology were among the earliest adopters among art museums, establishing an online presence as early as 1993. The Lin Hsin Hsin Art Museum, launched in Singapore, was one of the first virtual art museums completely modeled after a real-world museum.

Moreover, coping with shortage of technicians, art museums would not prioritise the opening of their official websites. This hesitation by traditional museums created an opportunity for independent developers and art enthusiasts to fill the gap. In the mid-90s, a number of unofficial “online museums” were launched by individuals outside museum institutions. These enthusiasts began creating their own digital galleries, often scanning or uploading images of famous artwork without formal permission from the museums that owned the originals. In some cases, these grassroots virtual museums put information online even before the museums themselves did. One of the most well-known case of “virtual museum” is the WebMuseum, formerly known as the Virtual Louvre, Web Louvre, founded by French student Nicolas Pioch.

== Founding and early development ==
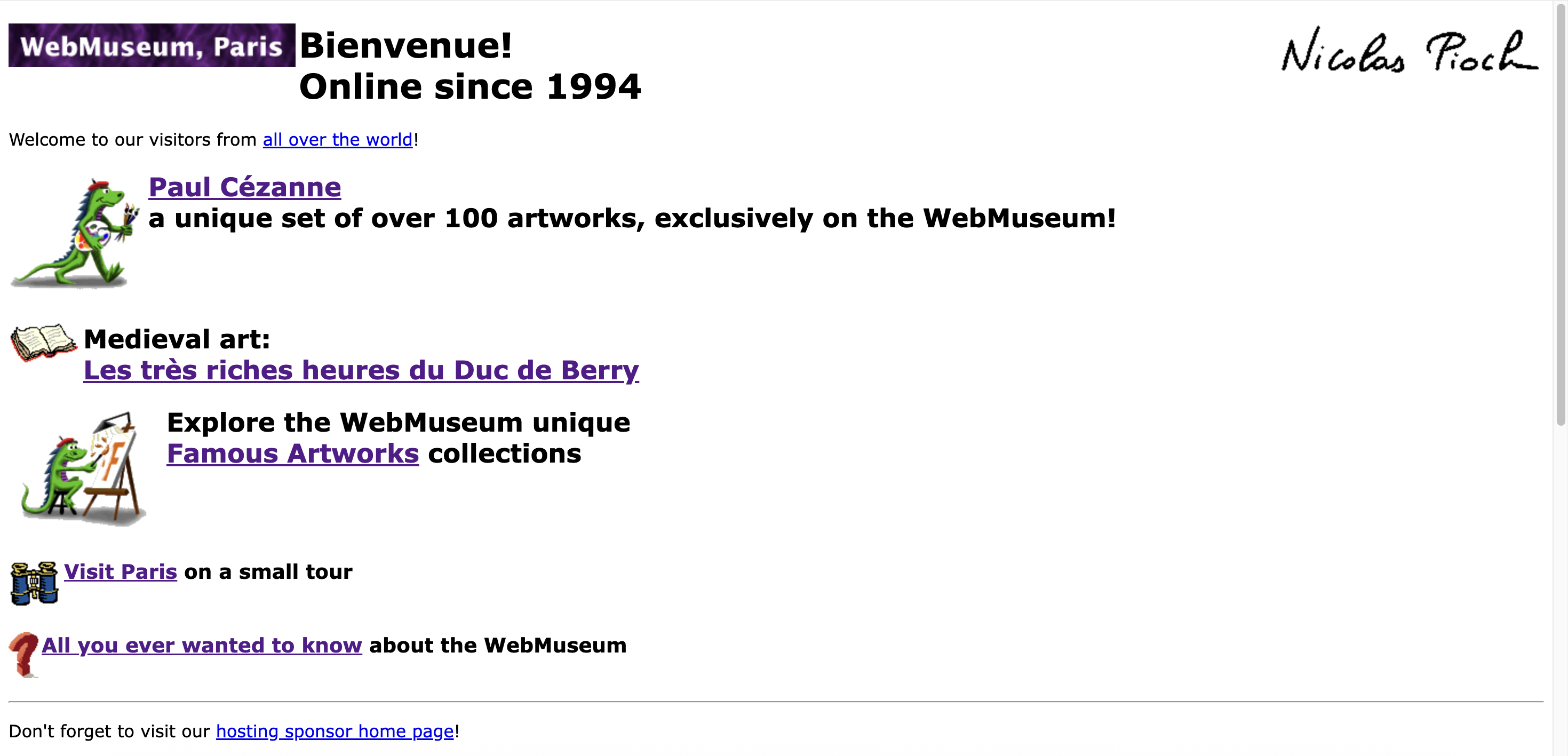
User interface of the WebMuseum

In March 1994, Nicolas Pioch, a 23-year-old student and computer science instructor at the École Nationale Supérieure des Télécommunications (ENST) in Paris, launched the WebMuseum. Initially part of the ENST's World Wide Web (WWW) server, the WebMuseum aimed to provide an accessible digital space for art enthusiasts worldwide. Pioch, alongside a growing network of external contributors, continually expanded the website's offerings. His motivation stemmed from a desire to introduce more artistic content to the internet, an arena then dominated by technical and commercial materials. He also saw the initiative as a form of protest against the commercialization of digital art collections, particularly by corporate entities such as Corbis Corporation, which had begun digitizing museum collections and acquiring exclusive rights to artistic images.

The WebMuseum quickly gained recognition for its innovative approach to online art exhibition. At the 1994 CERN WWW conference, it received the "Best Use of Multiple Media" award, underscoring its importance in pioneering web-based cultural dissemination.

However, legal concerns arose regarding its original name, "Virtual Louvre." At the request of the French Ministry of Culture, Pioch renamed it as "WebLouvre" in July 1994. In 1995, as the actual Louvre Museum became aware of Pioch's initiative, the museum decided to launch their official website.

While the WebMuseum was entirely altruistic, educational, and not-for-profit, the reaction of the Louvre was strongly negative:

“The domain name is owned by us again, recovered from a ‘cyber-squatting’ engineering student who had taken hold of it for apersonal website. Recovering the domain name naturally meantcreating a website”.

Media inquiries, the Louvre’s growing online presence and the reaction caused among internet users inside and outside of France led to another renaming, resulting in its final title: the WebMuseum.

Nicolas Pioch then eventually transferred the site’s database to the University of North Carolina and the Tokyo University of Science, started creating mirror websites. Even no longer hosted in France and its language became English, the website holds an important place in the early history of the digital culture and museum websites in France, despite its subsequent migration, in the brief history of allocating domain names.

== Innovations and contributions ==
Despite its lack of affiliation with the Louvre, the WebMuseum featured a vast array of renowned artworks, making high-quality (for the time) digital reproductions accessible to a global audience. The images, though mere digital representations, allowed art enthusiasts to engage with masterpieces that might have otherwise been inaccessible due to geographic or financial constraints.

The WebMuseum’s widespread popularity made its complete removal unfeasible, even if some institutions may have preferred its discontinuation. To improve accessibility, particularly given the slow internet speeds of the early 1990s, the site was mirrored on multiple servers worldwide. These mirrors enabled users across different regions to access content with reduced loading times. Many of these mirrored sites remain accessible today, serving as digital archives of the WebMuseum’s early contributions to online art dissemination.

WebMuseum's mirror sites located in Brazil, Hungary, Singapore, Mexico, Norway, Poland, Russia, UK and the United States

During the time, Pioch estimated that about 400,000 people had toured the WebMuseum and its dozens of mirror sites weekly, with over 30 million documents downloaded, mostly art images in the website.

The WebMuseum was also a forerunner in leveraging the hypertext capabilities of the web. By interlinking artists, movements, and terminologies, it enabled users to explore art history dynamically rather than through linear or isolated narratives. This interactive, web-based approach to art education set a precedent for future digital museum projects.

== Content and collections ==
The WebMuseum curates an extensive collection comprising several thousand artistic works by over 300 artists, predominantly from Europe, but also featuring select pieces from the United States and Japan. Spanning artistic movements from the 13th century Gothic period to contemporary works including pop arts, Pre-War American Painting and Abstract Expressionism from 20th century, the museum's collection provides a broad yet curated overview of Western art history. While paintings and sketches make up most of the archive, only a few examples extend beyond these mediums.

=== Abundant and well-organised collections ===
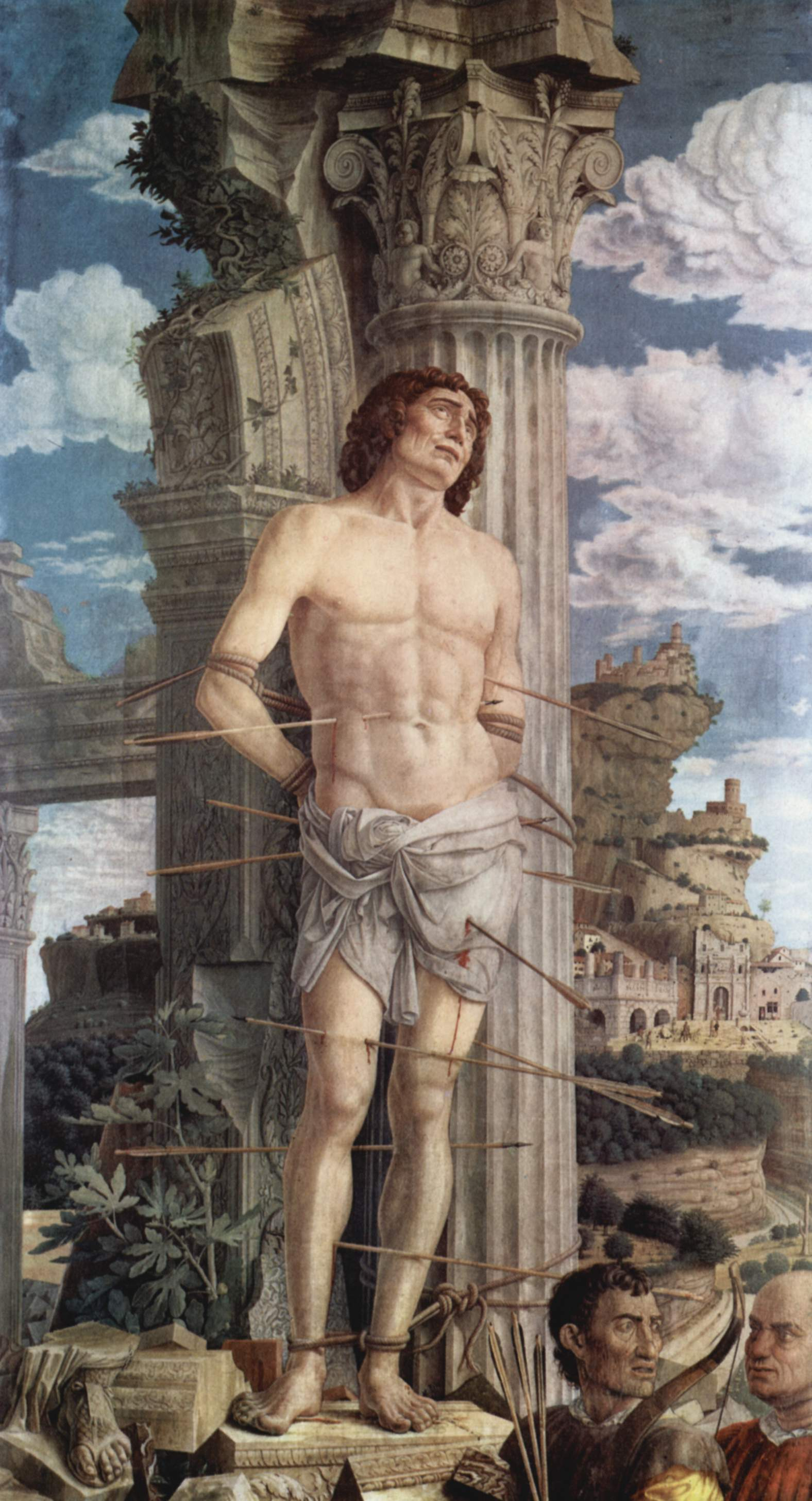
Image of Andrea Mantegna's Saint Sebastain

The collection is methodically organized both alphabetically by artist and thematically by artistic movement (e.g., Gothic, Romanticism, Impressionism). Each artist’s page typically included 8 to 10 representative works displayed as thumbnails, which users could enlarge for closer inspection. More renowned artists, such as Vincent van Gogh, had as many as a hundred images available. Each artist's page also contains a biographical summary that contextualized their work within the broader scope of art history, major artistic movements, and significant life events. Although Pioch's intention was never to create a Le Louvre's replica, the site did hold some of the Louvre's work. The site back then had the best reproduction of Mantegna's classic "Saint Sebastian" to be found online.

Beyond individual artist profiles, the WebMuseum features thematic essays ranging from 250 to 2,000 words. For example, its 1,500-word exposition on Impressionism provides an in-depth analysis, outlining its historical context, defining characteristics, and notable practitioners. The inclusion of sample images further enriches these discussions. In essays about other contemporary art movements like Dada, Futurism, WebMuseum briefly introduce their origins and development. The essays are mostly uncredited, presumably written by Pioch himself, and taken from the WebMuseum's partner Encyclopedia Britannica Online.

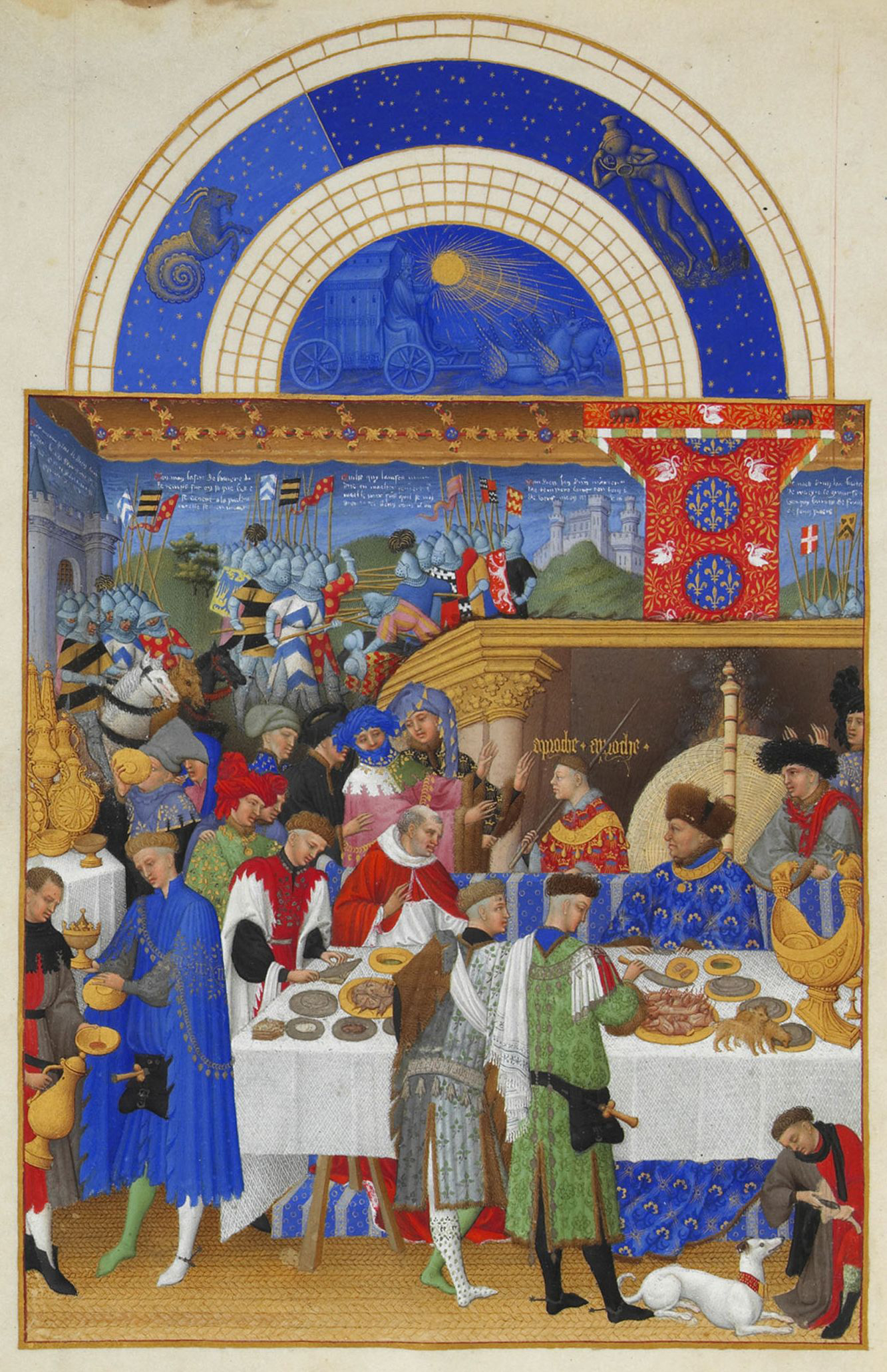
Les très riches heures du Duc de Berry Janvier (January)

Additionally, the site hosts specialized exhibitions. Notably, one focused on Paul Cézanne’s life and works, while another explored the medieval illuminated manuscript Très Riches Heures du Duc de Berry (The Very Rich Hours of the Duke of Berry). The Cézanne collection, the most comprehensive exhibition of single artist's work in the site, presents over 100 of his works from different periods of his career.

The Très Riches Heures collection includes interpretative commentaries on the calendar and symbolic meanings of the renowned illustrations by the Limbourg brothers, which are currently not available for public viewing. The collection proved particularly effective as an educational resource, offering detailed explanations on the historical significance of illuminated manuscripts, their production techniques, and the materials used. This exhibition underscored the WebMuseum’s dedication to not just showcasing art but also fostering a deeper understanding of the cultural and historical contexts behind the works.

=== Limitations on collections ===
One major drawback of the site is that its collection is predominantly Western works. Aside from a cursory examination of Japanese art in the thematic section, there is very little focus on non‐Western movements and even fewer examples of art from different cultures. The WebMuseum’s lower update frequency after 1996 made it unlikely for the site to further introduce new artists or artworks from non-Western traditions.

Also, due to the limitations on Web-based graphic resolution, the quality of art images presented alongside artists' introductions was compromised.

=== Major contributors and resources ===
Mark Harden, devoted to scanning fine art for the online usage since 1995, was one of the major contributors to the WebMuseum. Mark then went on to launch his own online gallery site, The Artchive, in 1998. The site, considered one of the top art resources online back then, is a combination of virtual museum and digital art history book. It provides thousands of artworks, artist biographies, and art history articles and resources.

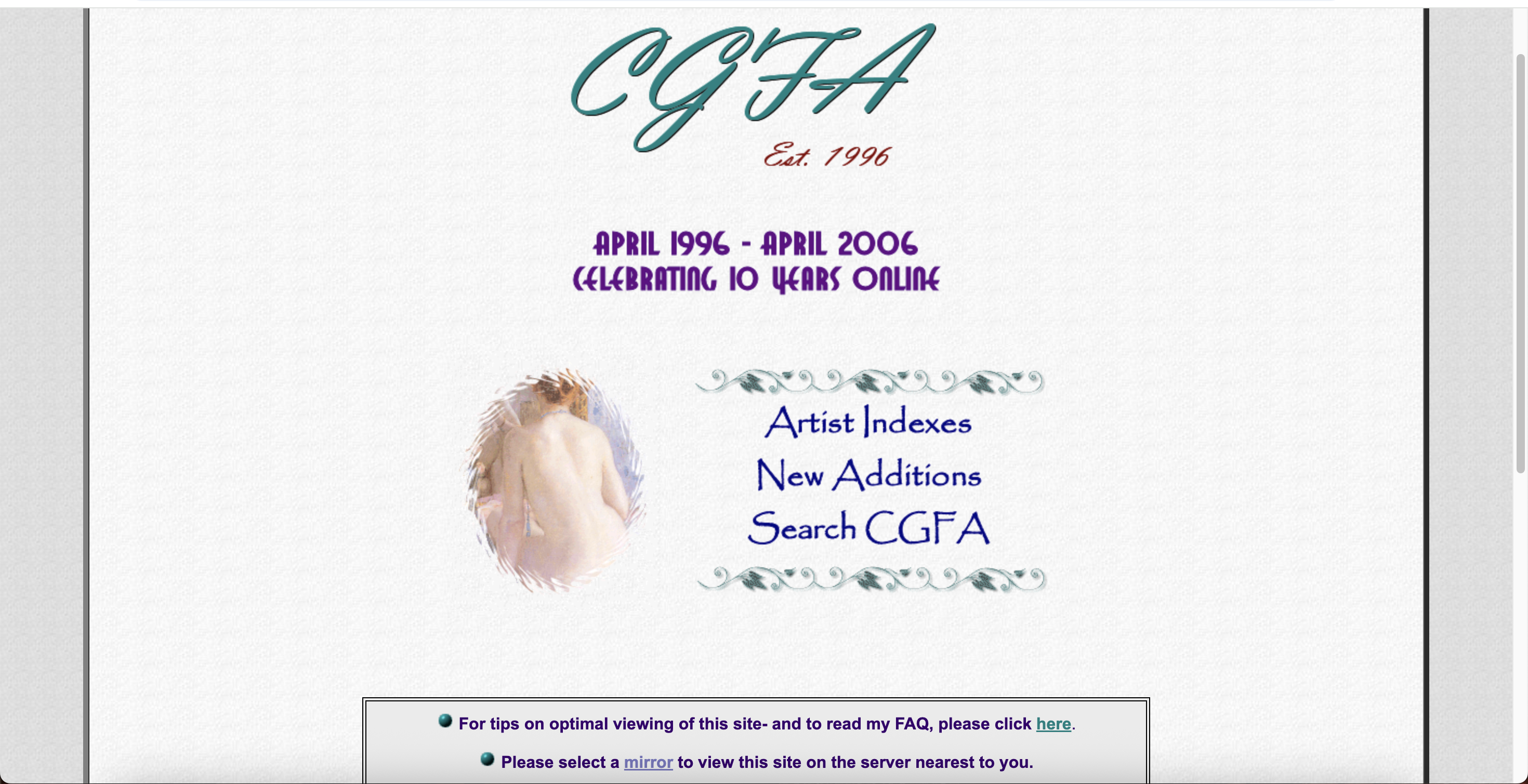
CGFA- A Virtual Art Museum, created by Carol Gerten-Jackson

Carol Gerten Jackson was another key contributor to the WebMuseum early on. Also launched her own site CGFA-A Virtual Art Museum in the 90s, Carol Gerten Jackson maintained the site and its mirrored sites for over a decade.

WebMuseum used resources from multiple art museum and their sites. Netherlands' Rijksmuseum was "highly recommend" in the site's credit page, it is referred to as "a perfect example of what a public service should be". Meanwhile, the site referred to other museums' statements regarding artwork copyright issues as "misleading" and their artworks were mostly "long fallen in the public domain".

== Impact on art accessibility and education ==
The WebMuseum played a significant role in making art more accessible. By presenting many high-quality digital reproductions of significant artworks, it enabled its users worldwide to engage with art history regardless of their location or financial situation. Its groundbreaking role in online art education laid the foundation for the extensive digital archives and virtual museum tours that many institutions offer these days.

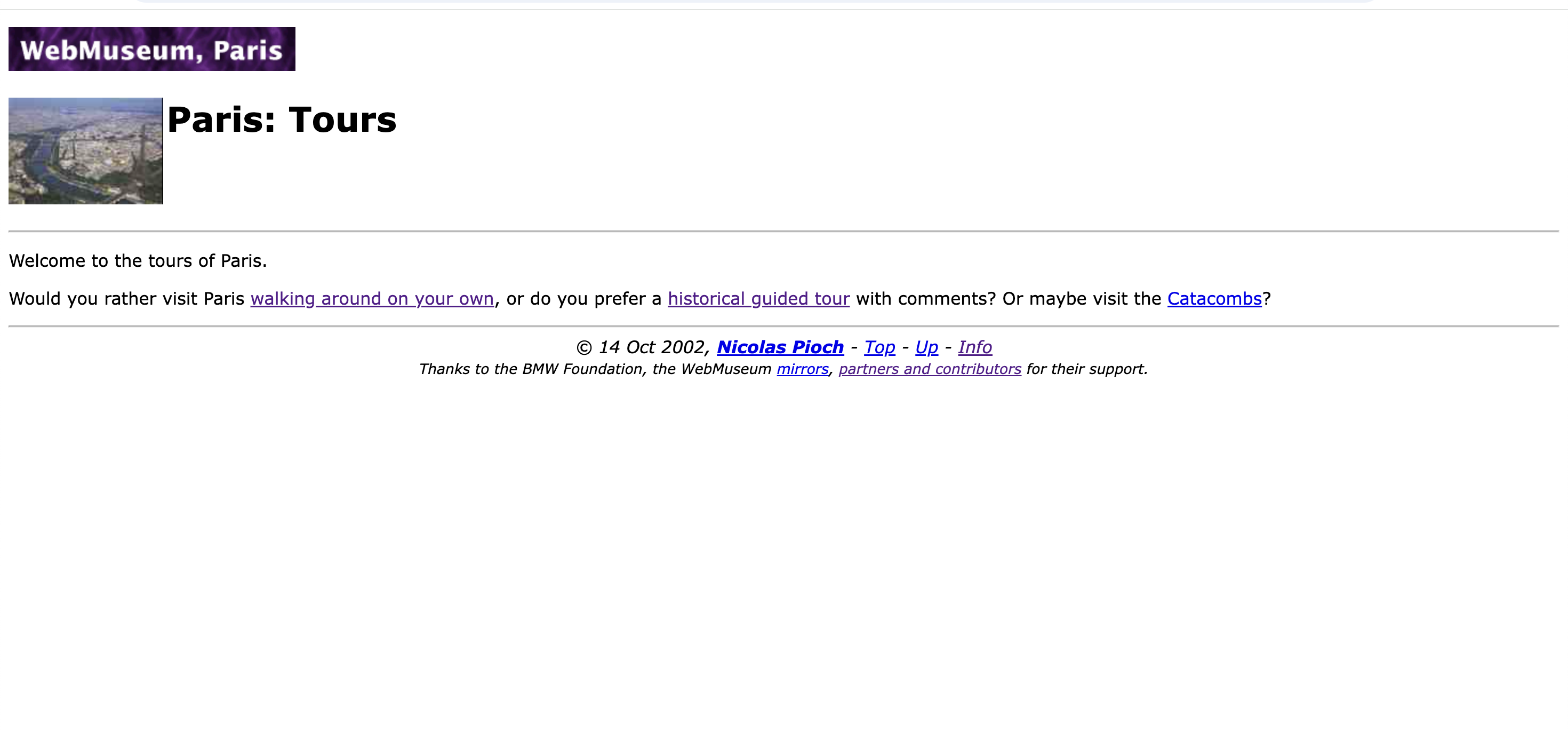
WebMuseum's Paris: Tour page, designed by Pioch

One of the WebMuseum’s greatest strengths was its interlinking of text within the site, which allowed navigation in essays and artist biographies containing links to other artists or terms. This interlink feature allowed users, particularly students, to explore art history dynamically, drawing connections between artists and their influences rather than perceiving them as isolated figures. This feature made it a valuable teaching tool, encouraging deeper engagement and research.

The WebMuseum also offered additional resources beyond its art collection. The site offers a virtual tour of Paris, designed by Pioch, featuring photographs and historical commentary. It included an 'Auditorium' section, providing access to sound clips from classical compositions, although some of these links later became inactive. Additionally, the WebMuseum provided general information about the project, outlining Pioch’s objectives and development.

=== Limitations ===
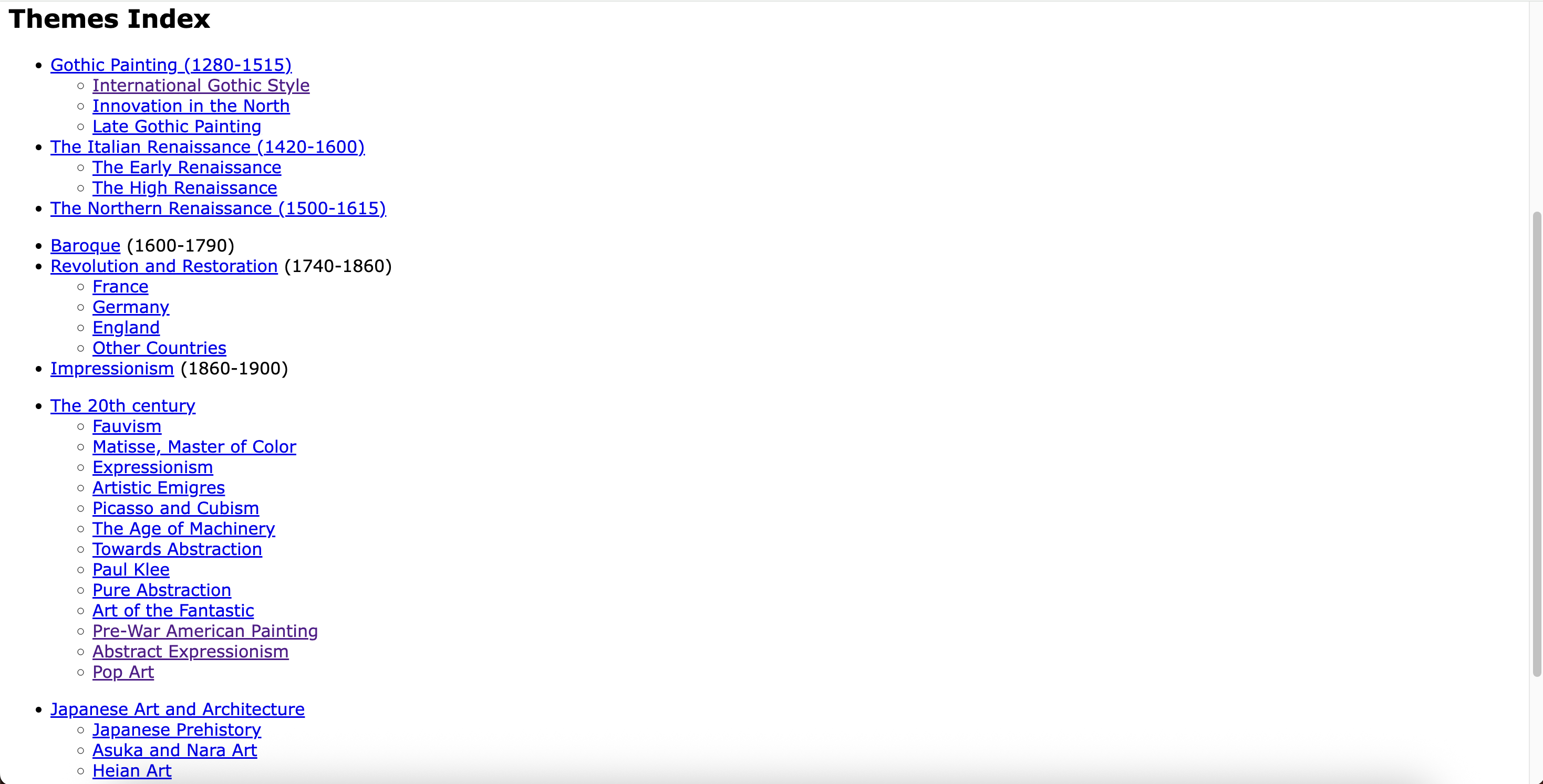
WebMuseum's theme index

However, as the WebMuseum presented mostly Eurocentric collection, largely overlooking traditions and influences from non-Western art. This lack of representation challenged students using the site, as they had to seek in the texts, in the works themselves, or through additional research elsewhere to gain a more comprehensive understanding of global art history. Additionally, the site doesn’t have a search feature, making it difficult for users unfamiliar with specific artists or movements to navigate the collection effectively within the site.

Despite these technical limitations, the website allowed students and educators to use its content for educational purposes, reinforcing its mission of being an open-access resource. Its influence extended beyond its immediate users, inspiring other digital museum initiatives.

By 2014, almost all major museums had established their own comprehensive online platforms in order to provide visitors with their digital collections of artworks, virtual tours, and educational resources, also to complement the museums' physical exhibits.

== See also ==
- The Artchive
- Web Gallery of Art
- Virtual Library museums pages
