= Singapore sling =

Cocktail with gin and cherry liqueur

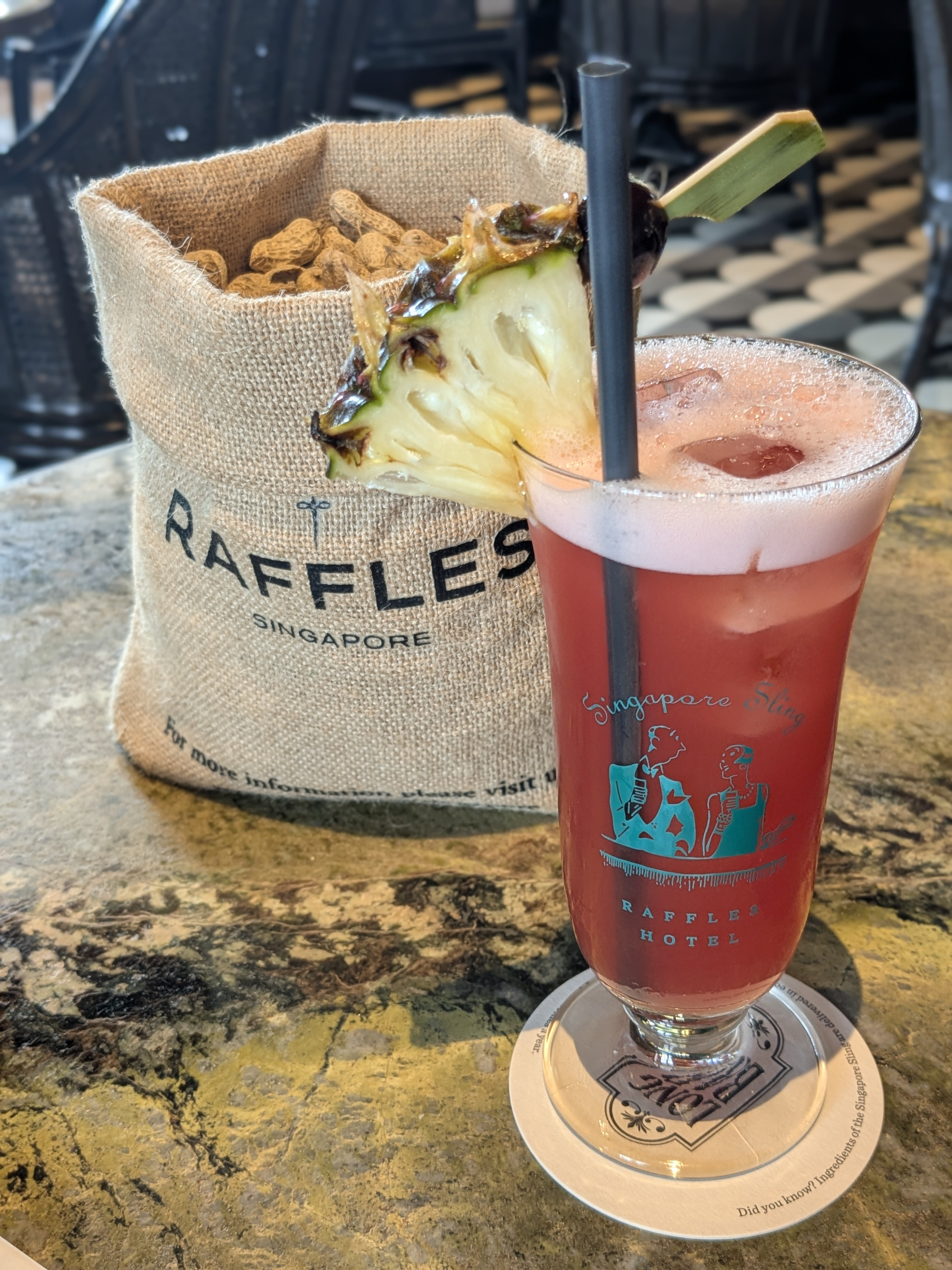
- Type: Mixed drink
- Ingredients: 30 ml gin; 15 ml Kirsch (Modern recipes mostly use Cherry liqueur); 7.5 ml Cointreau; 7.5 ml DOM Bénédictine; 120 ml fresh pineapple juice; 15 ml fresh lime juice; 10 ml Grenadine; 1 dash Angostura bitters
- Base spirit: Gin
- Standard drinkware: Hurricane glass
- Standard garnish: Pineapple and Maraschino cherry
- Served: Straight up: chilled, without ice
- Preparation: Pour all ingredients into a cocktail shaker filled with ice cubes. Shake well. Strain into a hurricane glass.

The Singapore sling is a gin-based sling cocktail from Singapore. This long drink was reputed to have been developed in 1915 by Ngiam Tong Boon, (Note: traditional Chinese: 嚴崇文; simplified Chinese: 严崇文; pinyin: Yán Chóngwén; Wade–Giles: Yen Ch'ung-wen) a bartender at the Long Bar in Raffles Hotel, Singapore. It was initially called the gin sling.

== History ==
The drink was created sometime between 1899 and 1915 at Raffles Hotel. Simon Difford wrote that the drink was originally Ngiam's "house" version of the gin sling. It was socially unacceptable for women to drink alcohol in public at that time, so Ngiam made the cocktail look like fruit juice to enable women to drink it. On the other hand, David Wondrich of Esquire claimed that the drink was created in the 1890s and wasn't related to the Raffles until the 1920s.

The original recipe of the Singapore sling is debated. This is because the original recipe was lost after the 1930s when the hotel stopped serving the drink. D. A. Embury stated in the Fine Art of Mixing Drinks: "Of all the recipes published for [this drink] I have never seen any two that were alike." The Times described the "original recipe" as a mixture of two measures of gin with one of cherry brandy and one each of orange, pineapple, and lime juice. The hotel's recipe was recreated based on a 1936 note by a visitor.

The Long Bar at Raffles Hotel sells 800-1200 Singapore slings every day. 70% of the total revenue of the bar comes from the sling, which earns the bar S$15 million in annual sales.

== Today ==
By the 1980s, in countries such as the United States, the Singapore sling was often little more than gin, bottled sour mix, and grenadine, a mixture showing very little relationship to the recipe used elsewhere under the same name. By that time both in the Raffles Hotel and Hong Kong, and generally in the UK, the recipe had remained standardised as gin and cherry brandy (in various ratios between 2:1 and 1:2). By 2000, Bénédictine was introduced and pineapple juice used more. In New Orleans, sometimes Hurricane mix was used instead of pineapple.

== Gin slings ==
The gin sling, attested from 1790, described a North American drink of gin, which was flavoured, sweetened, and served cold. The "Singapore sling" has been documented as early as 1930 as a recipe in the Savoy Cocktail Book: Ingredients one-quarter lemon juice, one-quarter dry gin, one-half cherry brandy: "Shake well and strain into medium-sized glass, and fill with soda water. Add 1 lump of ice".

This recipe persisted for decades and is recalled in 1982 in The Sainsbury Book of Cocktails & Party Drinks, where it is also called the Singapore sling and was the classic recipe of the time. A minor difference occurs in that the measures of the spirits were twice the quantity compared with the lemon and soda of the 1930 quotation and garnished with slice of lemon and a glacé cherry. These two very similar forms represent a traditional British version of the Singapore sling.

Also documented in The Sainsbury Book of Cocktails & Party Drinks is the Straits sling (also a Raffles Hotel invention named after the nearby Singapore Strait), which was even stronger, but also added Bénédictine, Angostura bitters, and orange bitters, but its garnish was both lemon and orange slices and it did not have the glacé cherry.

Brewer's Dictionary of Phrase and Fable (Brewer's) refers to the gin sling as "a drink mainly composed of gin and lemon" and states that it has been attributed to bartender John Collins of London, "but it dates from before his time and was found in the U.S.A. by 1800", which is similar to the John Collins, another cocktail of gin and lemon.

== See also ==
- Tom Collins
- List of cocktails
- List of Singaporean inventions and discoveries
