= National Digital Repository for Museums of India =

National Digital Repository for Museums of India is a C-DAC-led project to create a seamless access to collections and artifacts organized according to themes, regardless of the physical and geographical locations of the museums that house them. The first public version developed on Dspace was released in 2002. The initial draft of Open Archival Information System (OAIS) was also released in year 2003. It is necessary to transform museums for greater relevance and application for the modern society. Therefore, while focusing the needs of Indian museums, Dr. Dinesh Katre, Senior Director at C-DAC initiated the development of e-curator software named as JATAN (जतन): Virtual Museum Builder in 2001, which was developed and released in 2004. Subsequently, JATAN (जतन) software was deployed in Chhatrapati Shivaji Maharaj Museum, Mumbai; Raja Dinkar Kelkar Museum, Pune and The Baroda Museum & Picture Gallery in Vadodara. Although the response from museums was lukewarm, C-DAC continued developing JATAN (जतन) software into a comprehensive digital collection management system for museums. As part of this research, early visions of using crowdsourcing method for metadata enrichment of museum artefacts and unified virtual catalogue for Indian museums was presented in 2005.

During 2013, Ministry of Culture started the Vivekananda Memorial Museum Excellence Program in collaboration with the Art Institute of Chicago, USA. As part of this program various existing software solutions available in India were evaluated and finally JATAN: Virtual Museum Builder was selected for standardized implementation across national museums.

== Certification Program for Museum Curators ==
The team of Human-Centred Design & Computing Group at C-DAC, Pune organized JATAN certification training program in order to motivate and prepare the museum curators in taking on with the challenging task of digitization. Several batches of this 2 days training program for the museum curators were conducted. The training covered digitization best practices, hands on experience of JATAN software and exposure to advancements in digital heritage preservation, 3D Virtual walk-throughs, mobile apps, touch screen kiosk applications for museum visitors. Around 50 curators from 10 national museums were trained as part of this initiative.

== Standardized Implementation of JATAN (जतन) in National Museums ==
In the first phase this project, Ministry of Culture decided to implement JATAN (जतन) software in the following 10 national museums -

- National Museum, New Delhi
- Allahabad Museum, Allahabad, Uttar Pradesh
- Indian Museum, Kolkata, West Bengal
- National Gallery of Modern Arts (NGMA), New Delhi
- National Gallery of Modern Arts (NGMA), Mumbai, Maharashtra
- National Gallery of Modern Arts (NGMA), Bengaluru, Karnataka
- Archaeological Survey of India (ASI) Museum, Goa
- Archaeological Survey of India (ASI) Museum, Nagarjunakonda, Andhra Pradesh
- Salar Jung Museum, Hyderabad, Andhra Pradesh
- Victoria Memorial Hall, Kolkata, West Bengal

As per the technical specifications provided by Human-Centred Design & Computing Group at C-DAC, Pune the museums procured and established computer labs equipped with computers, server, digital camera, scanner, Network Attached Storage (NAS), Local Area Network (LAN) and broadband connectivity, etc. The museums also arranged local technical support for maintenance of this facility. Major achievement of this effort was that museums became self-reliant and started with the digitization at their own. After the successful implementation of JATAN software in 10 national museums, C-DAC was entrusted with a new project to develop the National Portal and Digital Repository for Museums of India.

== National Portal and Digital Repository for Museums of India ==
Ministry of Culture funded and entrusted this project to C-DAC, Pune with the objective of providing online and integrated access to digitized collections of 10 national museums by establishing the National Portal and Digital Repository for Museums of India. Human-Centred Design and Computing Group at C-DAC Pune designed and developed the portal as well as the software tools required for cataloging and digital repository management.

The main features of the national portal are as under-

- The portal introduces India's rich heritage through a diverse range of digital collections in terms of sculptures, paintings, manuscripts, arms and weapons, terracotta, pottery, coins and a numerous other category of antiquities.
- Search and retrieval across all museums and categories
- Automatic keyword suggestions
- Parameter based filtering of search results
- High resolution images with zoom-in/out and metadata
- Direct access to digital collections through categorization
- Virtual exhibitions with scholarly essays published by museum curators
- Automatic timeline mapping of objects
- Dedicated homepages for museums to managed by nodal officers
- Museum wise access to digital collections
- Museum wise event announcements
- Portal administration
- Scalable framework of virtual museums

The portal was inaugurated by honorable Minister for Ministry of Culture, Government of India, Shripad Naik on 21 October 2014. Presently, the national portal is providing online access to over 1,15,000 historical antiquities with approximately 5,00,000 digital images with metadata produced by 10 national museums.

== Data packaging and transfer ==
Digitization and metadata integration is undertaken locally in each museum. Transfer and integration of museum data in centralized database was the major challenges before us as museums are still to be connected over National Knowledge Network (NKN). Therefore, JATAN software has been supported with the functionality to package and transfer the digitized contents to C-DAC, Pune.

== Process for acquisition and ingesting of museums data ==
=== e-SANGRAHAN (ई-संग्रहण): E-acquisition tool ===
It is a digital data acquisition tool which receives the packaged data sent by the museums and makes to available for ingesting in Sanskriti Digitalaya system.

=== DIGITĀLAYA (डिजिटालय): e-Library and Archival System ===
It is an e-Library and Archival System primarily focusing on the long term archival and repository development of digitized contents in image, audio and video formats. This system is an adaptation of CCSDS Open Archival Information System (OAIS) Reference Model, ISO 14721: 2012 in cultural heritage domain. It supports the domain specific metadata standards like MARC21, Dublin Core, MODS, METS, etc. The system allows to configure archival strategies and dissemination package for the public access portal.

Human-Centred Design & Computing Group at C-DAC, Pune has designed technical quality assurance procedures for data acquisition, archival and dissemination. The correctness of information is to be ensured by domain experts in museums only.

== Unique advantages ==
- The National Portal and Digital Repository for Museums of India has dissolved the physical walls and removed the geographical distances between 10 national museums by merging them into a single Virtual Museum which can be accessed online through single window.
- Students and teachers can access the museums directly from home or classrooms.
- Researchers, scholars, historians and tourists can access the antiquities from anywhere.
- The project has created a comprehensive national database / register of museum antiquities which is necessary for management, protection and conservation of historical antiquities.

== Recognition ==
National Portal and Digital Repository for Museums of India won the Grand Jury Special Mentions Manthan Award in 2015 in e-Culture and Heritage Category. Hon'ble Minister for Culture, Dr. Mahesh Sharma has appraised Rajyasabha on the progress of JATAN Project in an official press release dated 4 April 2018. Another press release on capacity building to improve standards in museums also mentions about the progress on museums of India in collaboration with C-DAC, Pune.

== See also ==
- Virtual Museum
- National Digital Preservation Program
- Heritage Science
- Digitization
- Digital Preservation
