= Sling (drink) =

Type of cocktail

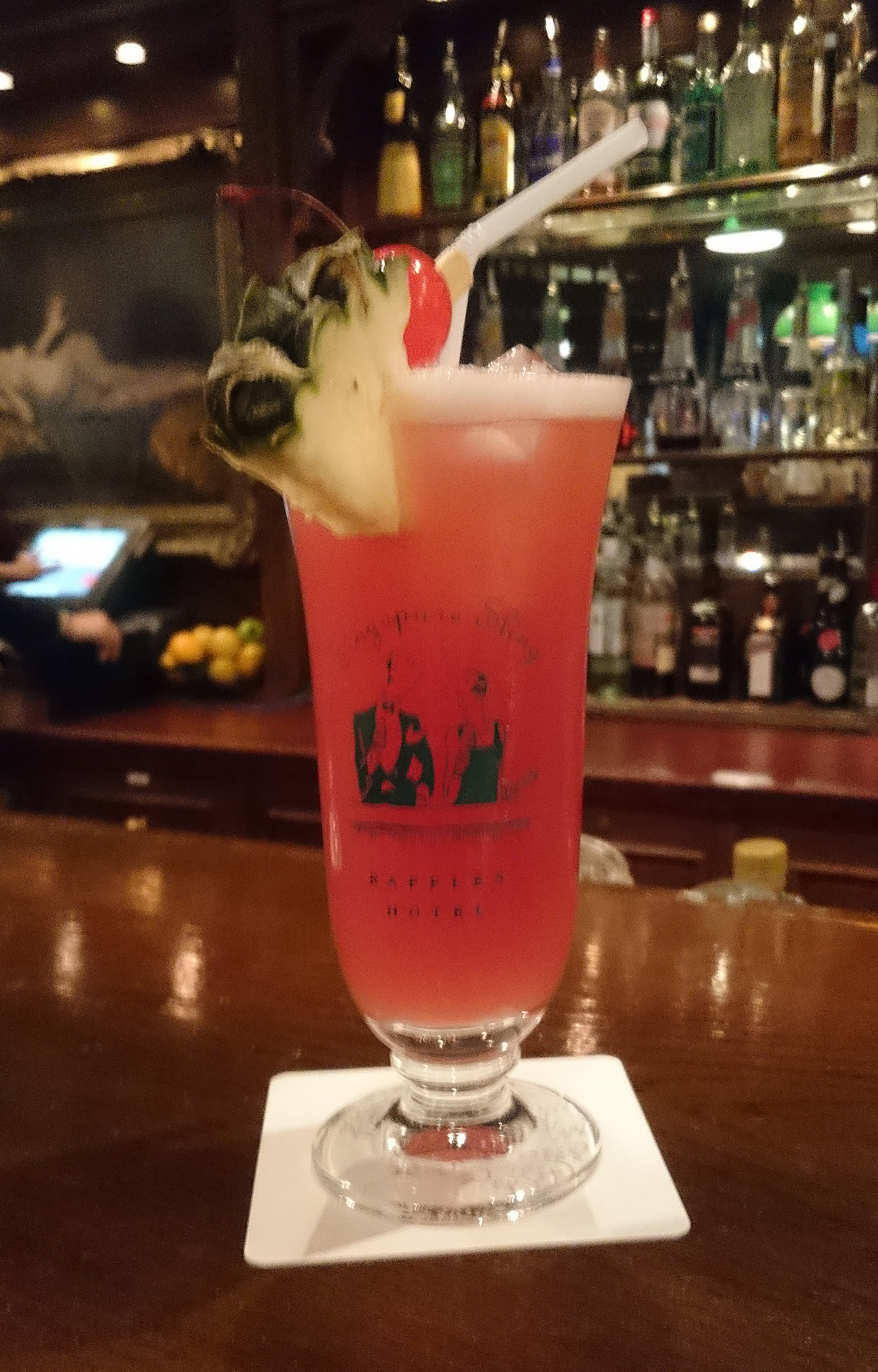
The Singapore sling is a popular gin sling originally made at the Long Bar, Raffles Hotel, Singapore

A sling is an alcoholic drink made of gin, whiskey, rum, or brandy spiced with nutmeg.

== History ==
The sling is an old drink, circa 1759, originally intended to be a single-serving punch, containing sour, sweet, and alcoholic ingredients in proportions that have varied with time. The introduction of bitters was a new twist added to some versions of the drink, creating a cocktail of spirit, sugar, water, and bitters, making a drink similar to an Old Fashioned. In its modern form, it is made with gin and, varyingly, of ingredients such as sweet vermouth, lemon juice, simple syrup, Angostura bitters, and soda water. Some sources suggest the word sling comes from the German schlingen, meaning "to swallow fast". The Oxford English Dictionary says that the origin is uncertain.

The Singapore Sling is a popular gin sling originally made at the Long Bar, Raffles Hotel, in Singapore. Recipes for it variously contain such ingredients as Benedictine, cherry liqueur, herbal liqueur, pineapple juice, lime juice, bitters, and club soda.
