= The Artchive =

Online art gallery

Artchive (formerly "The Artchive")
- Founded: 1998
- Founder: Mark Harden
- Website: www.artchive.com

Artchive, (formerly "The Artchive") is an online art gallery. It was established in 1998 by Mark Harden. He contributed to WebMuseum from 1995 before establishing the Artchive. A biography of the founder called it a "top art resource".

The Artchive website displays historic artworks with a convenient viewer that allows the size of the image to be set easily as required. It provides a leading online teaching resource for art at a university level.

The Artchive contains 3,500 artwork by more than 200 artists.

It has the same name as a service of SITO.

Notable works on the site include The Fight Between Carnival and Lent by Pieter Bruegel the Elder.

== See also ==
- Web Gallery of Art
- WebMuseum
