= Lin Hsin Hsin =

Singaporean artist, poet, musician

Lin Hsin Hsin 林欣欣
- Born: Singapore
- Known for: Digital Art, Poetry
- Website: www.lhham.com.sg

Lin Hsin Hsin (Chinese: 林欣欣; pinyin: Lín Xīn Xīn) is a Singaporean IT inventor, artist, poet and composer

== Early life and education ==
Lin was born in Singapore. She graduated in mathematics from the University of Singapore and received a postgraduate degree in computer science from Newcastle University, England. She studied music and art in Singapore printmaking at the University of Ulster, papermaking in Ogawamachi, Japan and paper conservation at the University of Melbourne Conservation Services.

== Career ==
In 1976, Lin painted "Distillation of an Apple", an oil painting claimed to visualised the construction and usage of Apple computer 7 days before the birth of Apple computer. In 1977, she painted "The Computer as Architect", an oil painting depicting the vision of the power of computer in architecture. Lin claimed she has never seen nor used a Computer-aided design (CAD) system prior to her painting while commercial CAD systems are available since early 1970s.

- 1988 March organized 1st Artificial Intelligence conference in Singapore
- 1991 February 1 poem titled "Cellular Phone Galore" predicted mobile phone, & cellular network BEFORE 2G GSM launch, 27 March 1991, p. 54,55, "from time to time"
- 1992 wanted to build a multimedia museum (letter to National Computer Board, Singapore)
- 1993 February, predicted the Y2K bug while building a ten-year forecasting model on an IBM i486 PC, Journal of the Asia Pacific Economic Conference (APEC), 1999
- 1993 August 21, poem title "Online Intimacy" on Online dating service, p. 235, "Sunny Side Up"
- 1993 August 23, poem titled "Till Bankrupt Do Us Part", on online shopping & e-commerce, p. 241, "Sunny Side Up"
- 1994 May, painted "Voices of the Future" – oil painting depicted the Wireless and mobile entertainment future lifestyle, p. 32, "Lin Hsin Hsin: Works from Art, Science & Technology Series"
- 1994 Designed and built a virtual museum in the world,
- 1995 September 9, poem titled "Virtual Offices" predicted virtual office as the concept of businesses, p. 20, "In Bytes We Travel"
- 1995 September 9, poem titled "The Day Will Come..." on SMS, using fingers to type on screen, p. 181, "In Bytes We Travel"
- 1996 October, predicted Twitter, tweeting as a way of life. in a diptych titled "twigee-tweedee", digital art in private collection, Paris, France
- 1996 October 1, poem titled "e-money" on digital currency & Cryptocurrency p. 58, "In Bytes We Travel"
- 1999 February 1, poem titled "Mobility" on mobility, p. 20, "Between the Lines"

=== IT Inventions ===
- 2018 May 19 Next Generation 100% Directed Acyclic Graph DAG-based blockchain protocol
- 2017 Nov 11 Encryption Algorithm
- 2017 FACT Finger on Android Circling Techniques—A Finger Intelligence Technology (FIT 3.0) on Android
- 2016 <PugScript>-- A Visual Language on Android
- 2016 4 new mathematical theorems, launched in London, June 2016
- 2016 STEP Sustainable Time-motion Enabled Power—A Finger Intelligence Technology (FIT 3.0) on Android
- 2015 FAME Finger/Fist Accelerated Mathematical Engine—A Finger Intelligence Technology (FIT 3.0) on Android
- 2013 TANGO Touch ANd GO—A Finger Intelligence Technology (FIT 3.0) on Android
- 2007 MedTECH 20/20 visions for all ages—POC done
- 2007 Super Image File Shrinkage for JPEG files

=== Startup ===
- 2018 SpaceGraph™ founder
- 2014 Founder Lin Hsin Hsin Intelligence Center
  - 2017 Blockchain Threats Intelligence
  - 2016 Biometrics Threats Intelligence
- 2016 Data Science
- 2006 IoT

== Contemporary Art ==
=== Paintings and sculptures ===
Lin Hsin Hsin specialises in oil painting, she has transformed the opaque properties of oil paint to make it translucent in 1988. As such, she has made oil paint to look like watercolor, Chinese ink as well as pastel, pencil or charcoal, as demonstrated in the Aqua Series of paintings. Besides oil paintings, she makes acrylic sculptures.

=== Art exhibitions ===
Lin Hsin Hsin has held 15 solo exhibitions in Singapore, Amsterdam, and San Jose, California, United States. She has participated in more than 220 exhibitions in 60 cities, 26 countries across Asia, Europe, North America and South America.

=== Art Collectors ===
Lin's art can be seen in private, public and museum collections in 32 cities across Asia, Europe, North America and Australia. In 1985, she was awarded a silver medal by the Société des Artistes Français, Paris. In 1987, Lin received the IBM Singapore Art Award, she has received Visiting Fellowship to Germany in 1988 and Japan Foundation Fellowship in 1991 Her artworks are in private, public and museum collections in Asia, Europe and North America.

=== Paper ===
Besides paper sculptures, papier collé, collograph and monoprints, Lin handmade acid-free paper. She has pioneered acid-free papaya paper and umbrella plant paper in 1992.

== Digital Media ==
=== Digital Media Pioneer ===
Lin is a digital media pioneer, She has created digital music in 1985, 3D digital art in 1987, and digital animation in 1989 in Singapore. Since 1993 to date, Lin has pioneered the use of a two-button mechanical PC Mouse to draw and paint Western and Chinese paintings. She has created digital oil paintings, watercolors, Chinese ink paintings and calligraphy. She also digitally sketches with this mouse. Hsin Hsin has never and does not use any tablet PC and stylus in such creation. More than 250 digitally created artworks were exhibited in 1997 in her 15th solo exhibition in Singapore.

=== Virtual Museum ===
In 1994, Lin set up a virtual museum the Lin Hsin Hsin Art Museum

=== Digital Art ===
Lin Hsin Hsin Started from the real-world, in 1985, she moved into the digital world.

However, Lin has, since 1994, began with the digital, and fabricated the digital into the real

Lin Hsin Hsin created Web art and Net art in 1995, HTML art in 1996 and she has developed interactive Web art since 1997. Lin pioneered virtual sculpting in 1999 in Singapore; it was exhibited in Paris, France in 1999, 2001, and 2003.

=== ISM ===
Lin believes in Mathematical & Computing fundamentals, she anchors on science to create art. She

- forbids drag & drop, scan & morph, cut & paste processes to create digital art.
- established Eco-computing initiatives for digital media in 2007.
- algorithm driven & equation-based
- Linux platform

=== Genres ===
Lin initiates, establishes and creates different genres of digital art:

- Non-Photorealistic Rendering Images (NPR) by a hand held device (mouse)
  - Images include digital oil paintings, digital watercolor, digital cartoons, digital Chinese ink, digital crayons, digital pencils, etc.
- Photorealistic Images by a hand held device (mouse)
  - Images include digital oil paintings, digital watercolor, digital Chinese ink, digital crayons, digital pencils, etc.
- Mathematical art
  - 2D – still images include: 253 categories of digital fabrics, digital coin
  - 3D – still and animated. Computation-based digital voyages; 3D modelling digital sculptures, 3D modelling digital objects
- Grid Geometry art
  - 2D Grid Geometry art
  - 2D Interactive Grid Geometry Art
  - 2D Perception-Based Art
  - 3D Perception-Based Art
    - lenticular, coleuraille
    - Stereoscopic 3D
- Equation-based art
  - 2D – still and animated. Images include digital oil and digital watercolor.
  - 3D – still and animated digital sculptures, digital jewelry digital objects. digital furnitures,
  - All 2D and 3D equation-based art can be realised and fabricated into real-world entities.
- Web-based art
  - 2D – still, animated and interactive.
  - 3D – still, animated and interactive.
- ICP (In-Camera Painting)
- Literary Art
  - Art based on a word meaning, as it is, homograph, homonym or heteronym, usually pun included.
- Android Smartphone Platform—FIT (Finger Intelligence Technologies)
  - 2D: finger digital painting without image editing software
    - animated and/performance, interactive
  - 2D: interactive finger Shimmering Pixels Assimilated Resistive Touchscreen Kindle ILuminated Emissions (SPARKLE) on Android, in Real Time.
  - abstract
    - calligraphic
    - photorealistic
  - 3D: finger digital sculptures
  - 4D: finger gestures and finger choreography enabled live 3D performance
  - 4D: live 3D performance

==== EMOJI CITY ====
Lin initiates and creates different genres of emoji, still and animated. She built and launched an Emoji City, 12 September 2016.

==== BLOCKMOJI ====
Lin initiates and creates different genres of blockmoji—An emoji genre for blockchain, both still and animated. She launched Blockmoji, 8 August 2018.

== Music ==
=== Digital music ===
From conceptualisation to composing, from sound calibration to mastering, Lin has produced music on a PC without a sound card and midi instruments. Lin creates virtual instruments including a virtual didgeridoo, a berimbau used by the Brazilian aborigines. In 2006, Lin has realised the sonification of nature, including a rainforest, waterfalls and wind by an interactive virtual sound board she has created. Hsin Hsin's music has been performed in Vienna, Austria in 2002, Bourges, France in 2003, 2004 and Pisa, Italy, 2005.

=== Music visualisation ===
Lin has composed music and painted music as an artist. The 45 paintings in the "Abstraction in Music" Series (1986–1987) is her interpretation of music on canvas, as she is moved by the music of great composers such as Handel (Water Music), Mozart (Jupiter Symphony), Franz Liszt (Rhapsodies dan l'espace), Vivaldi (The Four Seasons), Debussy (La Mer). In addition to the canvases, there are the paperworks subtitled "La Petite Séries" created with different techniques, an abstraction of audio visualisation—perceived images of the sound in music such as Musical Ornaments: Trill, Appoggiatura and Turn (Staccato) and sound in the universe like Woodpecker.

Lin has conceptualised and written about the art in music and music in art. Since 2002, Hsin Hsin has digitally created visual music, or animated music, as she puts it.

2005, Lin built wearables and lights that response to music.

2006, Lin built paradigm shift interactive digital real-world musical instruments—I-Musika

=== Interactive music ===
Lin developed an interactive Music Sound Board in 2006. The creation of this soft sound board enables real time creation of the sound of nature. Examples are elements of sound audible in nature, such as rain forest, insects, water, and wind.

== Bibliography ==
Lin is an author of 75 books, including ten poetry books.

=== Poetry Books ===
- Lin, Hsin Hsin (1989). Take a word for a walk (1st ed.). Singapore: Select Books. ISBN 981-00-1085-0. OCLC 20731035.
- Lin, Hsin Hsin (1991). From time to time (1st ed.). Singapore: Select Books. ISBN 981-00-2705-2. OCLC 25287096.
- Lin, Hsin Hsin (1992). Love at 1st byte (1st ed.). Singapore: World Scientific. ISBN 978-981-283-185-9. OCLC 841171188.
- Lin, Hsin Hsin (1994). Sunny side up. Singapore: Select Books. ISBN 981-00-5840-3. OCLC 61730021.
- Lin, Hsin Hsin (1997). In bytes we travel (1st ed.). Singapore: World Scientific. ISBN 981-02-3359-0. OCLC 37966416.
- Lin, Hsin Hsin (2004). Between the lines. Singapore: Ethos Books. ISBN 981-04-9512-9. OCLC 70649668.
- "To The Point", 2010
- "iWrite", 2011, ISBN 978-981-08-9367-5

=== Contemporary art books ===
- Lin, Hsin Hsin (1987). Lin Hsin Hsin : work from Abstraction in music series. National Museum Art Gallery (1st ed.). Singapore: National Museum Art Gallery. ISBN 9971-84-914-3. OCLC 214943450.
- Lin, Hsin Hsin (1989). Lin Hsin Hsin : work from aqua series. National Museum Art Gallery. Singapore: National Museum Art Gallery. ISBN 981-00-1090-7. OCLC 21146359.
- Lin, Hsin Hsin (1990). Lin Hsin Hsin : memoirs of Frankfurter Buchmesse series : British Council Exhibition Hall, Singapore, May 1990. British Council Exhibition Hall. [Singapore?]: The Council. ISBN 981-00-1898-3. OCLC 23278397.
- Lin, Hsin Hsin (1991). Lin Hsin Hsin : work from time series. National Museum Art Gallery (1st ed.). Singapore: National Museum Art Gallery. ISBN 981-00-2704-4. OCLC 25961398.
- Lin, Hsin Hsin (1992). Lin Hsin Hsin : work from nature series. National Museum Art Gallery (1st ed.). Singapore: National Museum Art Gallery. ISBN 981-00-3901-8. OCLC 29634859.
- Lin, Hsin Hsin (1994). Lin Hsin Hsin : work from art, science & technology series. Empress Place (1st ed.). Singapore: Empress Place Museum. ISBN 981-00-5852-7. OCLC 34304916.

==== Digital media ====
- "Perception-based Art" 2011, ISBN 978-981-07-0662-3
- "The Art of Mondriaan by Lin Hsin Hsin", 2011, ISBN 978-981-07-0141-3
- "A New Paradigm for Visualization and Generating Grid Geometry Art and Beyond" 2010, ISBN 978-981-08-3437-1
- "bel canto, Volume VIII: leaves n petals", 2010, ISBN 978-981-08-6987-8
- "bel canto, Volume VII: blobs n spots", 2010, ISBN 978-981-08-6986-1
- "bel canto, Volume VI: blue n white", 2010, ISBN 978-981-08-6985-4
- "bel canto, Volume V: the fabric of vision", 2010, ISBN 978-981-08-6984-7
- "bel canto, Volume IV: in focus", 2010, ISBN 978-981-08-6983-0
- "bel canto, Volume III: between the lines", 2010, ISBN 978-981-08-6982-3
- "bel canto, Volume II: when black meets white", 2010, ISBN 978-981-08-6981-6
- "bel canto, Volume I: bird entering the teatro", 2010, ISBN 978-981-08-6980-9
- "Voice Over Intellectual Properties By Lin Hsin Hsin Volume III: Classic", 2010, ISBN 978-981-08-6990-8
- "Voice Over Intellectual Properties by Lin Hsin Hsin, Volume II: Paper As A Medium", 2010, ISBN 978-981-08-6989-2
- "Voice Over Intellectual Properties by Lin Hsin Hsin, Volume I: Digital Media", 2010, ISBN 978-981-08-6988-5
- "Painterly Yours", 2009, ISBN 978-981-08-9439-9
- "The Art of i,j,k", 2010, ISBN 978-981-08-9410-8
- "The A – Z of Visualization", 2010, ISBN 978-981-08-9438-2
- "What is in a Brush", 2008, ISBN 978-981-08-9437-5
- "The Automorphism of Amalgamation Polytopes and Tessellation", 2008, ISBN 978-981-08-9411-5
- "A New Paradigm for Visualization and Generating Grid Geometry Art", 2007, ISBN 978-981-08-3437-1
- "When Equations Paints", 2007, ISBN 978-981-08-3383-1
- "Every Pixel Counts", 2003, ISBN 978-981-08-3423-4
- "@art : A Cyberart show by Lin Hsin Hsin", 1997, ISBN 978-981-00-9142-2

=== Digital music ===
- "Rudiments Mapping ‒ An Axiomatic Approach to Music Composition". International Computer Music Conference Proceedings. 2003. 30 June 2003. hdl:2027/spo.bbp2372.2003.098.
