= Web Gallery of Art =

Virtual gallery for European fine art

- Logo of Web Gallery of Art.
- Company type: Virtual museum/Online art database
- Founded: 1996; 30 years ago
- Founder: Emil Kren and Daniel Marx
- Headquarters: N.A.
- Area served: Worldwide
- Services: Virtual art gallery
- Website: www.wga.hu

The Web Gallery of Art (WGA) is a virtual art gallery website. It displays historic European visual art, mainly from the Baroque, Gothic and Renaissance periods, available for educational and personal use.

== Overview ==
The website contains reproductions of over 48,600 works and includes accompanying text on the artworks and artists, accessible through a searchable database. The site is a leading example of an independently established collection of high-quality historically important pictures.

The viewer can select the size of the image; associated music is also included to accompany viewing, and posters of displayed artworks are available. The facility was created by Emil Kren and Daniel Marx.

== Copyrights ==
Most of the images in the gallery are of works that are out of copyright, as they were all produced before 1900 and all named artists in the collection were born well before 1900. However, copyright for the reproductions displayed on the website may apply within some legal systems. The WGA itself gives the following copyright statement:

The Web Gallery of Art is copyrighted as a database. Images and documents downloaded from this database can only be used for educational and personal purposes. Distribution of the images in any form is prohibited without the authorization of their legal owner.

Very little information is given on the pages presenting the images, as to who the legal owner of each might be. In the United States, photo reproductions of public domain two-dimensional art are also in the public domain, as affirmed by the decision in the case of Bridgeman Art Library v. Corel Corp., but this is not the case for photo reproductions of three-dimensional art such as sculptures. Copyrights of the sculpture images therefore remain unclear. Copyrights of the text on the website are also unclear; most of the reproductions in the gallery are displayed as catalog items unaccompanied by any explanatory text, but short explanatory notes for artist biographies or important artworks do exist and are unreferenced.

== Database ==
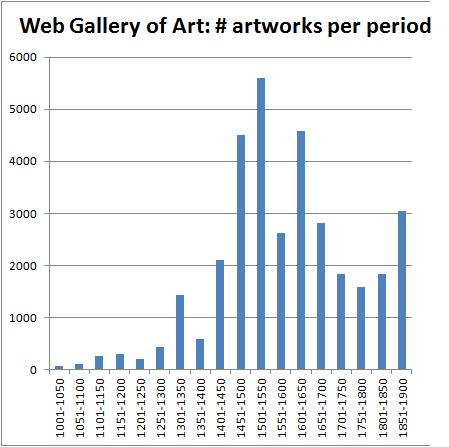
Number of artworks per period. Data taken from the Web Gallery of Art database downloaded in March 2014

Their database with over 48,600 artworks created by over 4,000 artists is free to download and they have published statistics over their virtual collection that are on their statistics webpage. Artworks installed in churches and from private collections are represented as well as museums. What follows is a list of institutions with more than 50 works represented on their website, based on their downloadable database.

Sortable table
Source Institution	Source Location	# Titles
assorted private collections	worldwide	2184
Accademia Carrara	Bergamo	54
Akademie der bildenden Künste	Vienna	202
Alte Pinakothek	Munich	329
Art Institute	Chicago	107
Ashmolean Museum	Oxford	84
Baptistry	Florence	72
Basilica dei Santi Giovanni e Paolo	Venice	68
Basilica di San Marco	Venice	72
Basilica di San Pietro	Vatican	61
Bibliothèque Nationale	Paris	172
British Museum	London	278
Cappella Scrovegni (Arena Chapel)	Padua	125
Cappella Sistina	Vatican	329
Cappella Tornabuoni, Santa Maria Novella	Florence	54
Cathedral of St Bavo	Ghent	77
Chapel of San Brizio, Duomo	Orvieto	57
Duomo	Prato	54
Frans Hals Museum	Haarlem	72
Galleria Borghese	Rome	174
Galleria degli Uffizi	Florence	821
Galleria Nazionale d'Arte Antica	Rome	130
Galleria Palatina (Palazzo Pitti)	Florence	275
Gallerie dell'Accademia	Venice	394
Gemäldegalerie	Dresden	249
Germanisches Nationalmuseum	Nuremberg	58
Graphische Sammlung Albertina	Vienna	116
Groeningemuseum	Bruges	137
Hungarian National Gallery	Budapest	71
Koninklijke Bibliotheek	The Hague	59
Kunsthalle	Hamburg	75
Kunsthistorisches Museum	Vienna	456
Liechtenstein Museum	Vienna	229
Lindenau-Museum	Altenburg	68
Lower Church, San Francesco	Assisi	61
Mauritshuis	The Hague	91
Metropolitan Museum of Art	New York	794
Musée Condé	Chantilly	66
Musée d'Orsay	Paris	430
Musée du Louvre	Paris	1715
Musée d'Unterlinden	Colmar	58
Musée Rodin	Paris	60
Royal Museums of Fine Arts of Belgium	Brussels	187
Museo Correr	Venice	53
Museo del Prado	Madrid	742
Museo del Settecento Veneziano, Ca' Rezzonico	Venice	66
Museo dell'Opera del Duomo	Florence	105
Museo dell'Opera del Duomo	Siena	94
Museo di San Marco	Florence	75
Museo Diocesano	Cortona	69
Palazzo Ducale	Venice	132
Museo Nazionale del Bargello	Florence	163
Museo Nazionale di Capodimonte	Naples	68
Museo Poldi Pezzoli	Milan	70
Museo Thyssen-Bornemisza	Madrid	256
Museum Boijmans Van Beuningen	Rotterdam	77
Museum Mayer van den Bergh	Antwerp	62
Museum of Fine Arts	Boston	177
Museum voor Schone Kunsten	Ghent	78
Národní Galerie	Prague	91
National Gallery of Art	Washington	517
Koninklijk Museum voor Schone Kunsten	Antwerp	141
National Gallery of Scotland	Edinburgh	84
National Gallery	London	545
Nationalgalerie	Berlin	99
Neue Pinakothek	Munich	100
Palazzo Vecchio	Florence	58
Museum of Art	Philadelphia	54
Pinacoteca di Brera	Milan	225
Pinacoteca Nazionale	Siena	73
Pinacoteca	Vatican	105
Pushkin Museum	Moscow	68
Residenzgalerie	Salzburg	77
Rijksmuseum Kröller-Müller	Otterlo	69
Rijksmuseum Vincent van Gogh	Amsterdam	128
Rijksmuseum	Amsterdam	674
Rockox House	Antwerp	58
Royal Collection	Windsor	167
Royal Library	Windsor	61
San Francesco	Arezzo	135
Santa Maria Gloriosa dei Frari	Venice	70
Scuola Grande di San Rocco	Venice	126
Staatliche Museen	Berlin	795
Staatliche Museen	Kassel	98
Städelsches Kunstinstitut	Frankfurt	113
Stanza della Segnatura, Palazzi Pontifici	Vatican	61
Szépmûvészeti Múzeum	Budapest	533
Tate Gallery	London	57
The Hermitage	St. Petersburg	1106
Upper Church, San Francesco	Assisi	84
Victoria and Albert Museum	London	82
Wallace Collection	London	168
Wallraf–Richartz Museum	Cologne	153

== See also ==
- List of artists in the Web Gallery of Art (A–K)
- List of artists in the Web Gallery of Art (L–Z)
- List of sculptors in the Web Gallery of Art
- List of graphic artists in the Web Gallery of Art
- The Artchive
- WebMuseum
