= Lin Hsin Hsin Art Museum =

The Lin Hsin Hsin Art Museum is notable as the first virtual museum completely modeled after a real-world museum. It has a live cyber graffiti wall and a search engine.

This online art museum website was originally established by the IT Inventor, digital artist, poet and composer Lin Hsin Hsin from Singapore in 1994 during the initial expansion of the World Wide Web. The site presents Lin Hsin Hsin's real-world contemporary art, digital art -- created by several breakthrough technologies, and the latest -- digitally created, displayed and performed in real-time on Android smartphone through online exhibits and has won several awards. Using advanced technology, the website was the first of its kind in Asia.
