= Van Schendel =

Van Schendel and Van Schijndel are Dutch toponymic surnames meaning "from Schijndel" (locally Skendel), a town in North Brabant. People with this name include:

- Bernardus van Schijndel (1647–1709), Dutch genre painter, a.k.a. Bernardus van Schendel
- Petrus van Schendel (1806–1870), Dutch-Belgian genre painter
- Arthur van Schendel (1874–1946), Dutch writer of novels and short stories
- Arthur F.E. van Schendel (1910–1979), Dutch art historian and museum director, son of Arthur
- Antoon van Schendel (1910–1990), Dutch racing cyclist, brother of Albert
- Albert van Schendel (1912–1990), Dutch racing cyclist, brother of Antoon
- Jan van Schijndel (1927–2011), Dutch football midfielder
