= Loire Maritime Museum =

Museum in Châteauneuf-sur-Loire, France

Coordinates: 47.8647°N 2.2173°E

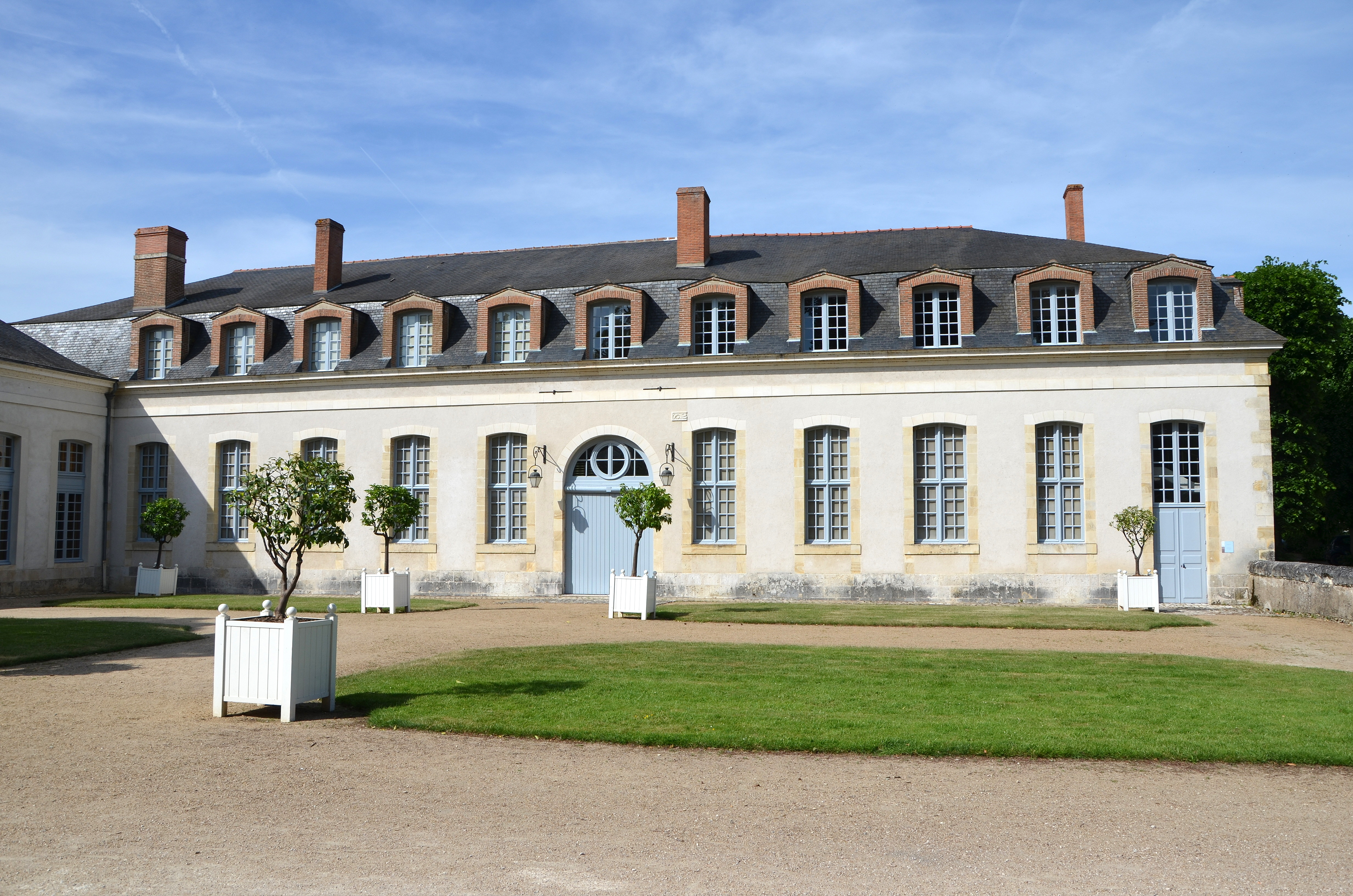

The Loire Maritime Museum (French: Musée de la Marine de Loire) is a municipal maritime museum in Châteauneuf-sur-Loire. It is housed on the right bank of the river Loire in the former stables of château de Châteauneuf-sur-Loire and covers ships and boats on the Loire. It is a Museum of France under the definition in law 2002-5 of 4 January 2002.

Châteauneuf-sur-Loire was one of the main ports on the Loire at the end of the 18th century and is on the perimeter of the région naturelle of Val de Loire on the World Heritage Register. It has a thirty-person auditorium, bookshop and gift shop.

== History ==
It originated in 1960, when exhibitions on ships and boats on the Loire began, as did reconstructions of boats used on the Loire. Two years later those exhibitions became permanent and the museum was transformed stage by stage. The museum formed a friends' association in 1963.

Initially controlled by the direction des musées de France, its running was transferred to the town council in 1984. Since 1985 it has had an archive, consisting of postcards, slides and works. Since October 1998 it has been rehoused in the former stables, after being officially opened by Bernadette Chirac. Those buildings had been made a monument historique in 1927.

== Collections ==
The ground floor displays construction techniques for boats on the Loire and how they navigated the Loire. On the mezzanine is a display on the trade routes that included the Loire. On the first floor has displays on sailors' lives. 75 wash drawings by Jean-Jacques Delusse also illustrate the history of boats on the Loire. There are also spaces on the history of Châteauneuf-sur-Loire itself and three local artists, namely the writer Maurice Genevoix and the painters Odilon Redon and Camille Roche.

== Visitor numbers ==
It had 13038 visitors in 2012, making it the fifth most visited museum in the department that year.

Museum Attendance Data
| | 2008 | 2009 | 2010 | 2011 | 2012 | 2016 | 2017 |
|---|---|---|---|---|---|---|---|
| Musée de la marine de Loire | 13,657 | ▲16,277 | ▼14,225 | ▼14,232 | ▼13,038 | ▼12,309 | ▲14,896 |
| Loiret | 303,000 | ▼304,315 | ▼296,200 | ▼260,450 | ▲284,462 | ▼260,077 | |

== External links (in French) ==
- Le musée de la Marine de Loire sur Chemins de mémoire.
- « Musée de la Marine de Loire » on the Culture Ministry's base Joconde
