= International Committee for Exhibition Exchange =

The International Committee for Exhibition Exchange (ICEE) is a committee of the International Council of Museums (ICOM). It is a nongovernmental organization with formal relations to the UNESCO and functions as a forum for the dissemination of knowledge and experience about exhibitions.

The committee deals with many different aspects of exhibition development, circulation, and exchange. It also collects information about potential as well as existing travelling exhibitions. The ICEE holds meetings annually and has publications that offer solutions to the problems of organizing exhibitions.

== See also ==
- Art exhibition
- Art gallery
- Curator
- National Touring Exhibitions
- Travelling exhibition
