= Altar of the Gens Augusta =

Ancient Roman altar at the Bardo National Museum

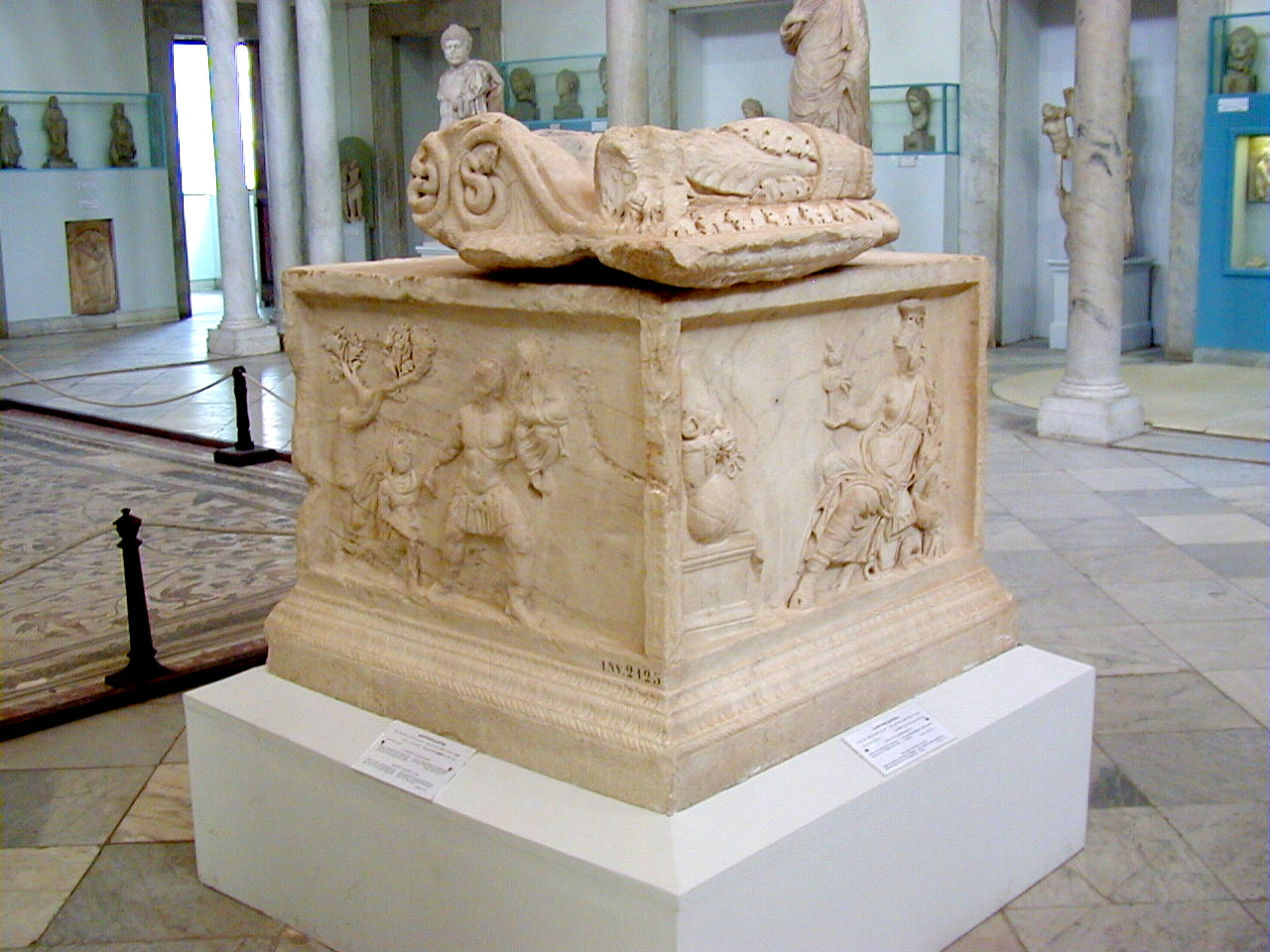
Altar in the Carthage room of the Bardo Museum

The Altar of the Gens Augusta is a Roman altar associated with the Imperial cult of ancient Rome, which was discovered on the slopes of Byrsa hill above the port of the ancient city of Carthage (modern Tunis). It is now kept in the Bardo National Museum in Tunis.

== Historical context ==
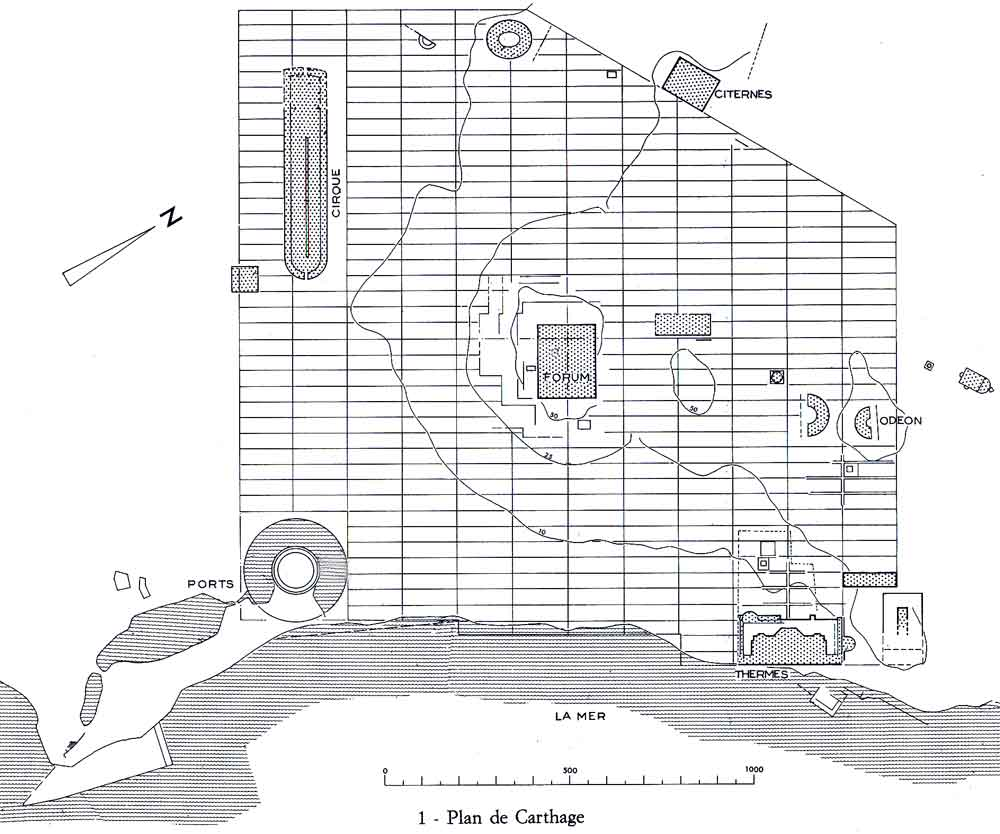
Plan of Roman Carthage. The altar was found near the forum.

The altar was found in the immediate vicinity of the Temple of the Gens Augusta. Like several other public buildings, the temple belonged to the Roman quarter of Carthage, which was laid out following the establishment of the Roman colony in 29 BC. The name chosen for the colony, Colonia Iulia Concordia Carthago referenced Augustus's adopted family, the Gens Julia on the one hand and, on the other, the Roman goddess of peace, Concordia, patroness of the city.

== Description ==
The altar is made from Carrara marble and is decorated with shallow relief on all four sides. The reliefs were framed by a kind of pilaster, covered with stems and either laurel leaves or flowers. On the first side there are five human figures and a bull which is to be prepared for a taurobolium (ritual sacrifice). The second side shows the flight of Aeneas. In his left arm he holds his father Anchises, while in his right hand he leads his son Ascanius/Iulus. The Gens Julia claimed descent from Iulus. Vergil's Aeneid describes how Aeneas visited the founder of Carthage, Dido, after his flight from Troy. The two remaining sides show Rome personified in the form of an Amazon and Apollo with a cithara, a god closely connected with Augustus.

Side reliefs

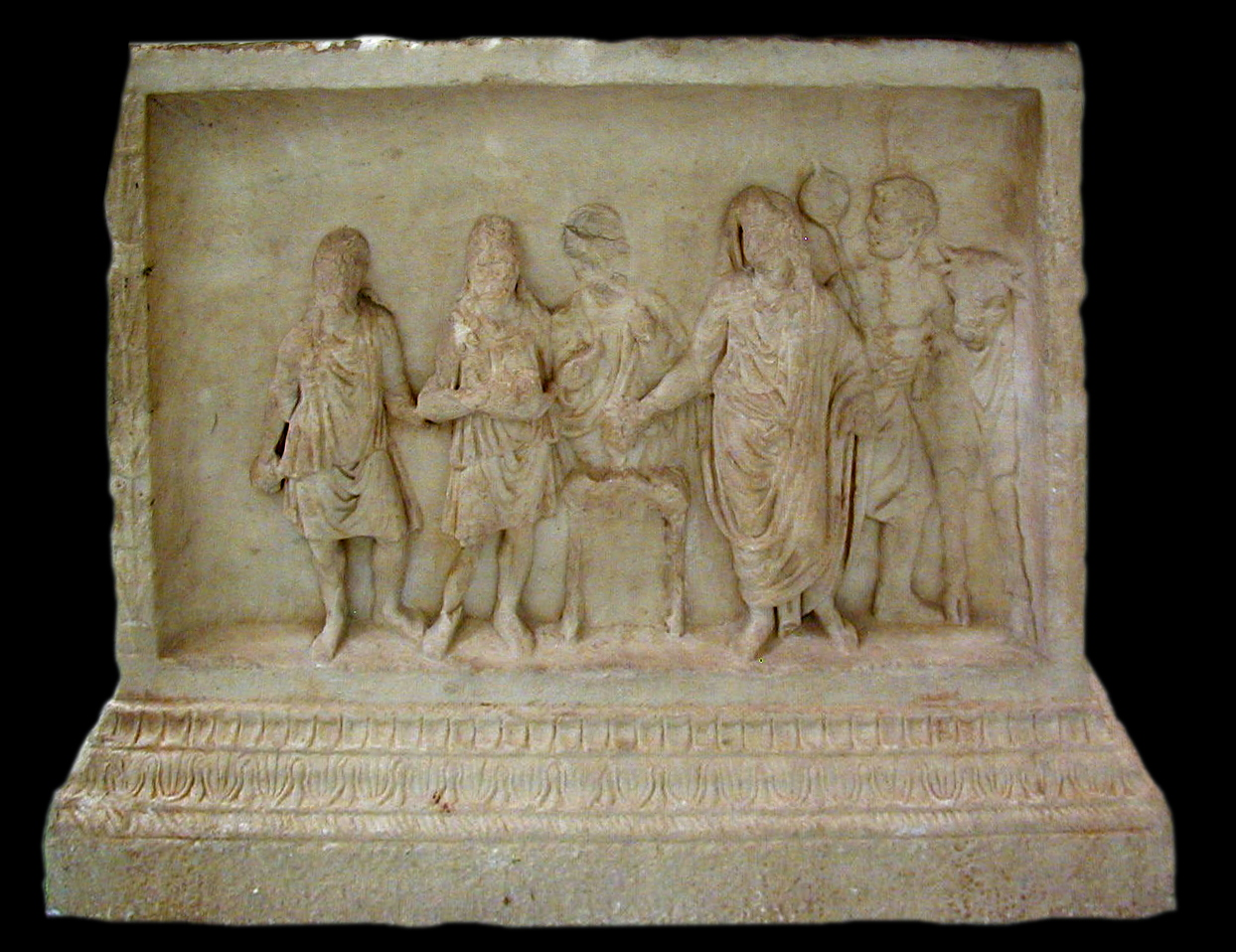
Taurobolium

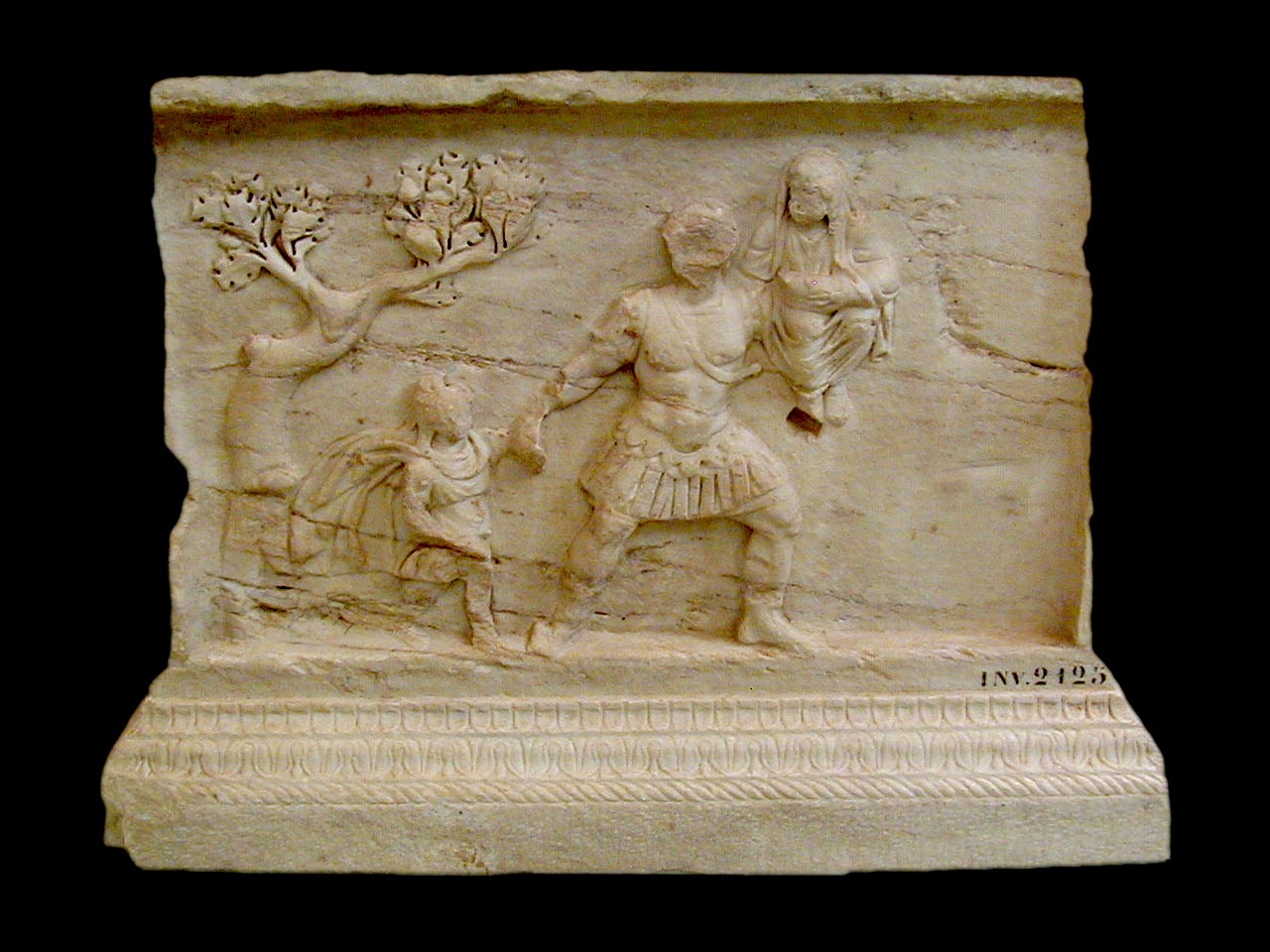
Flight of Aeneas

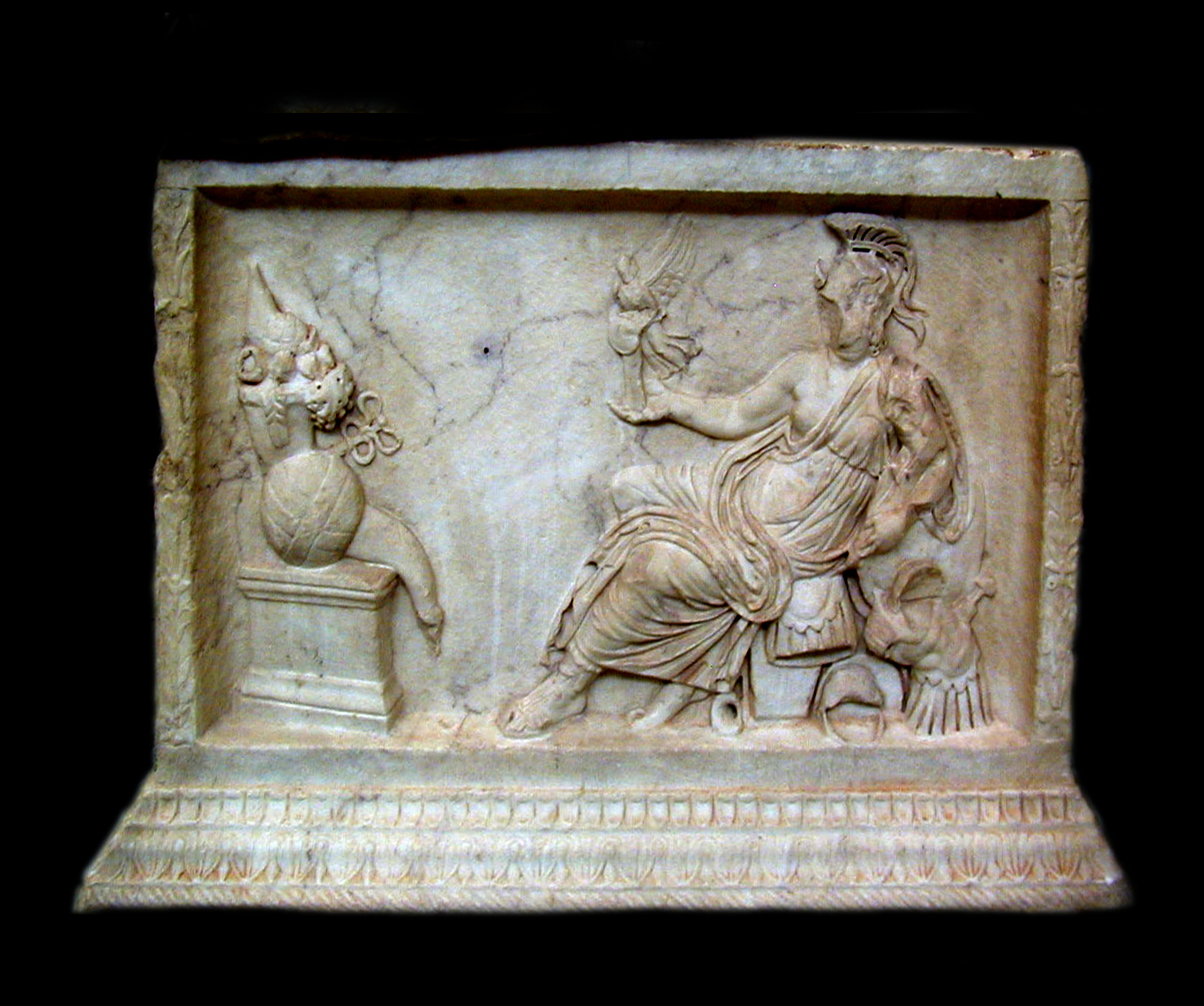
Personification of Rome

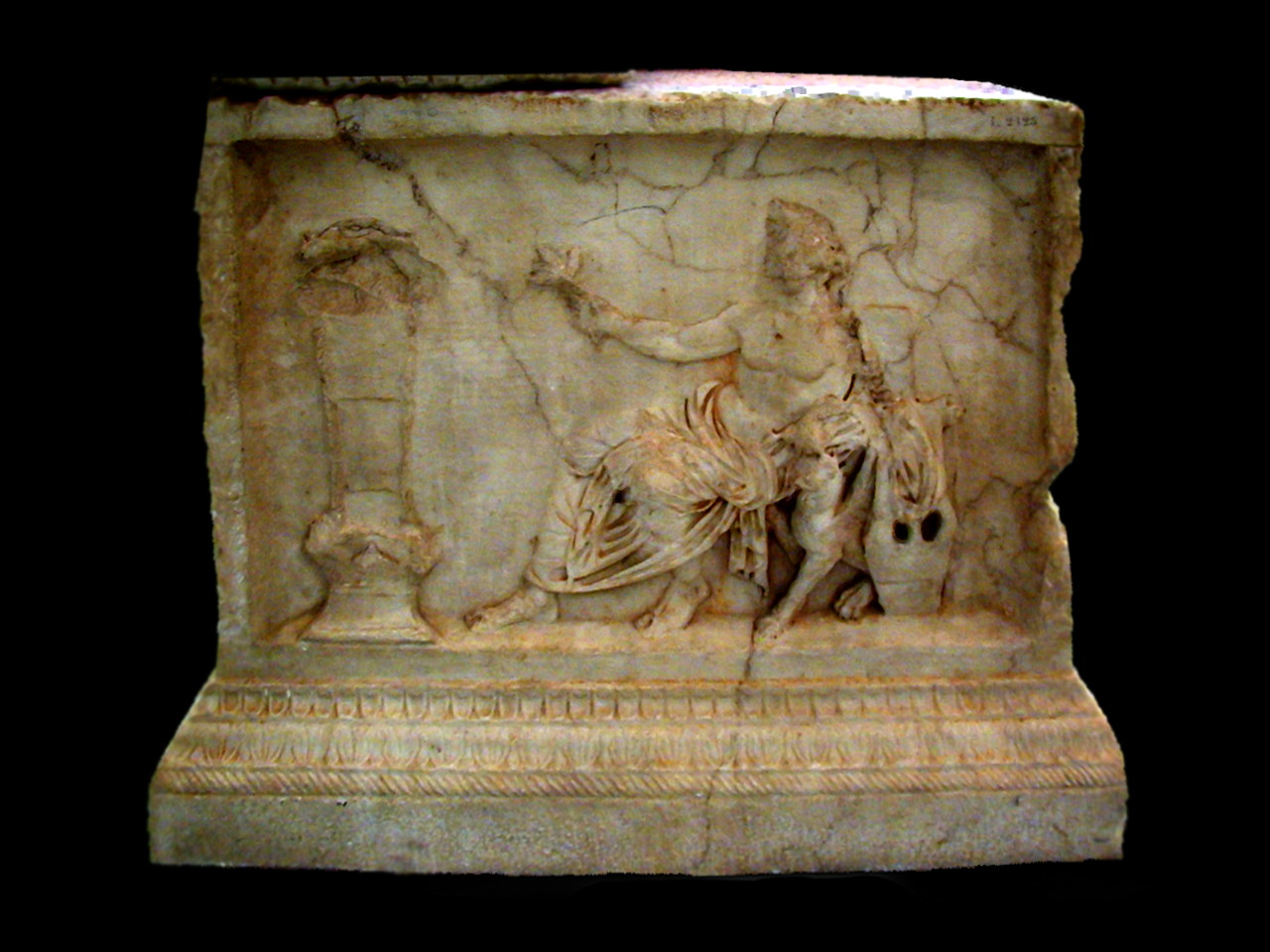
Apollo

== Significance ==
The altar was discovered in 1916 to the acclaim of scholarly circles. Louis Poinssot published a monograph in 1929 which is the basic reference work for the artwork to this day.

In the middle of the twentieth century, Jean Charbonneaux identified the altar as an exceptional example of Roman popular cult. He emphasised its "clarity and naive simplicity," especially given that "only a few monumental reliefs survive from the time of Augustus."

Further scholars have affirmed the significance of the altar. The Tunisian archaeologist Abdelmajid Ennabli saw it as an "important document for the understanding of Imperial ideology." For Mohamed Yacoub it is a manifesto of Augustan art, since it creates a connection "between Roman realism and Greek idealism." Yann Le Bohec even considered it the "most spectacular display of Roman art in Africa yet known."

== Bibliography ==
- Louis Poinssot. L’autel de la Gens Augusta à Carthage, Direction des antiquités et des arts, Tunis/Paris 1929.
