= Jean Hubert =

Jean Hubert may refer to:

- Jean Hubert (aircraft designer) (1885–1927), French aviation pioneer and aircraft designer
- Jean Hubert (archaeologist) (1902–1994), French art historian
- Jean Joseph Hubert (1765–1805), French Navy officer and captain
