= Charbonneaux =

Charbonneaux is a surname. Notable people with the surname include:

- Jean Charbonneaux (1895–1969), French archaeologist
- Philippe Charbonneaux (1917–1998), French industrial designer
