= Travelling exhibition =

Exhibition presented at more than one venue

Traveling Exhibitions

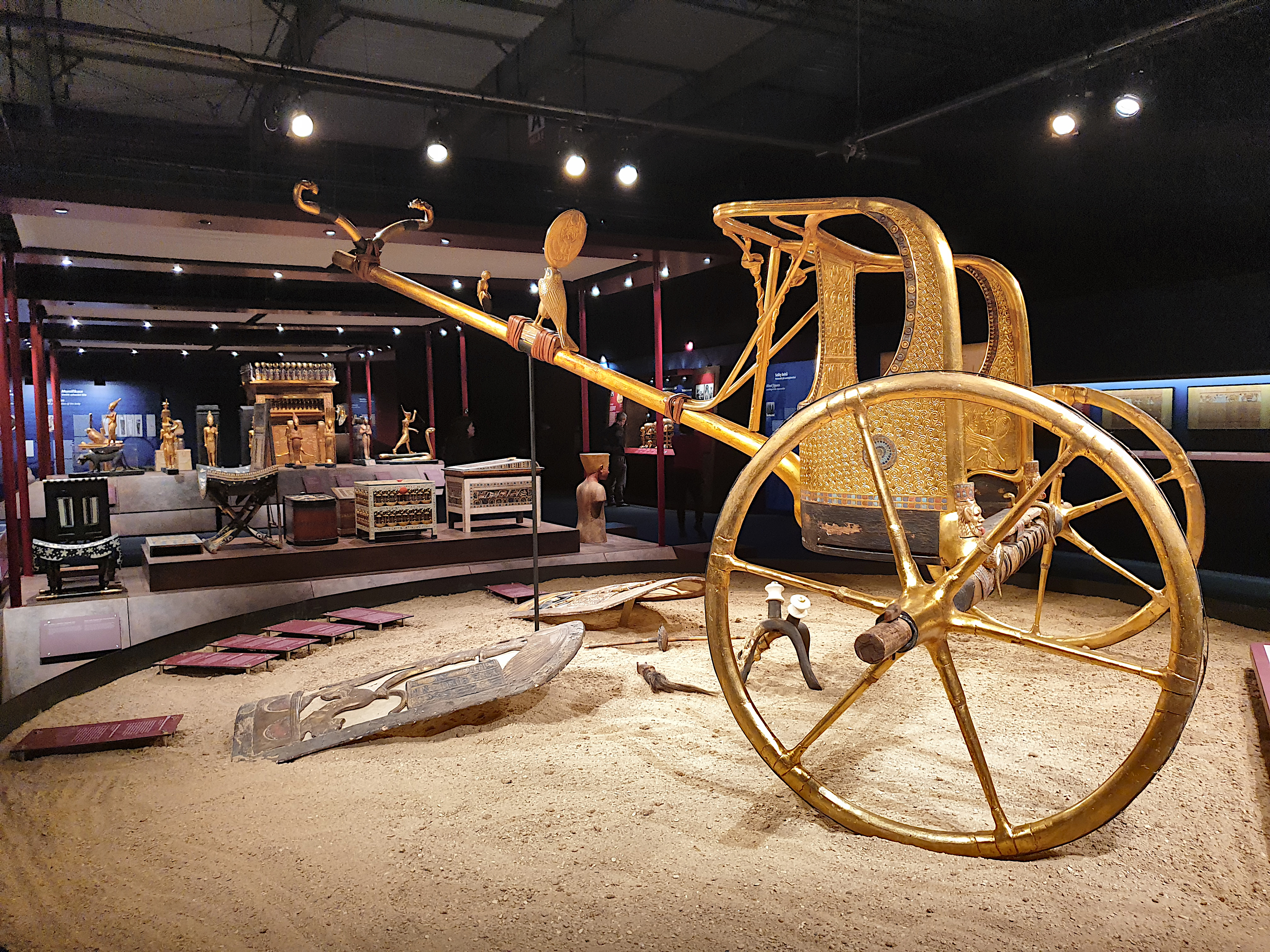
Tutankhamun: His Tomb and His Treasures, a travelling exhibit of replicas

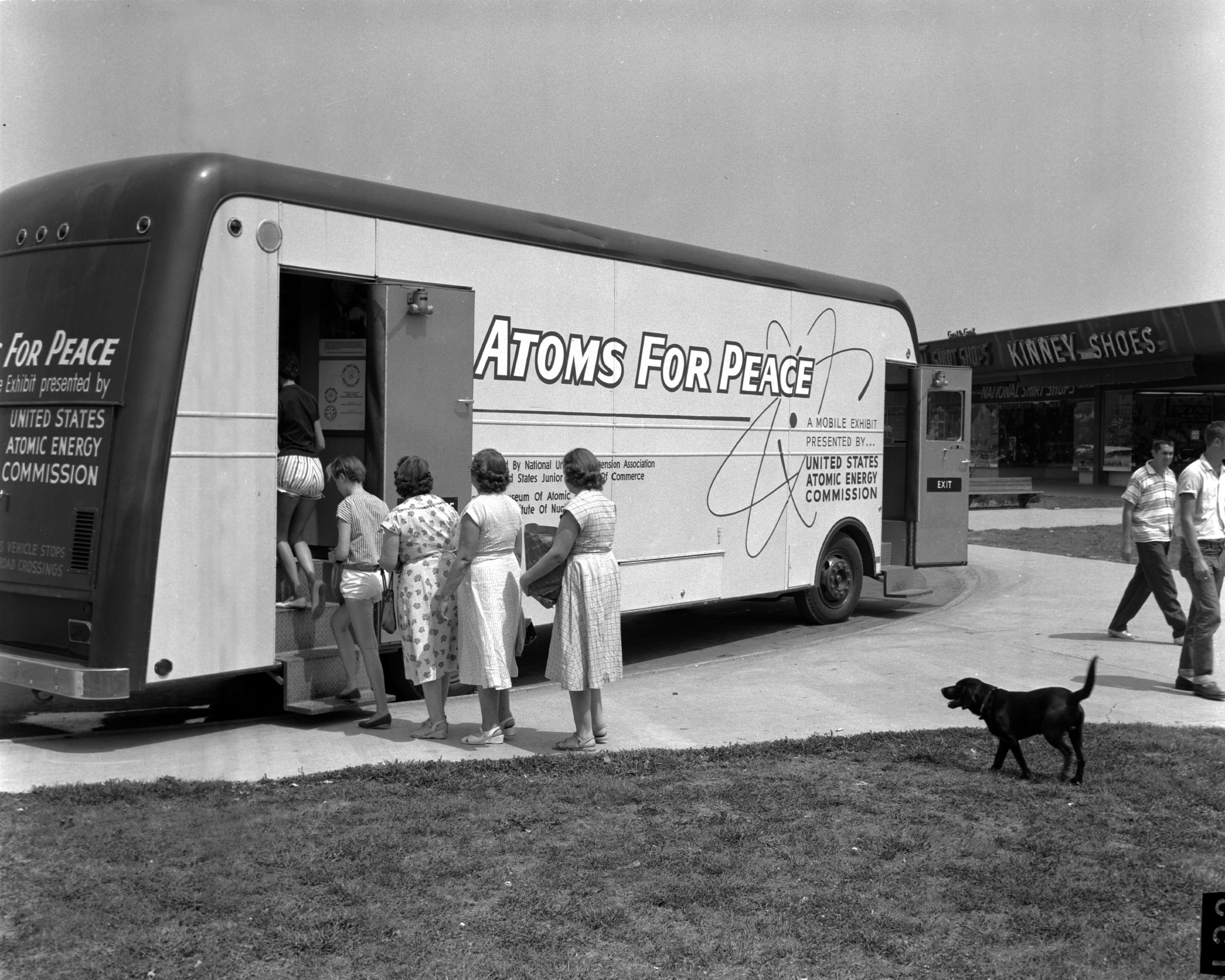
Atoms For Peace Traveling Exhibit in Oak Ridge 1957

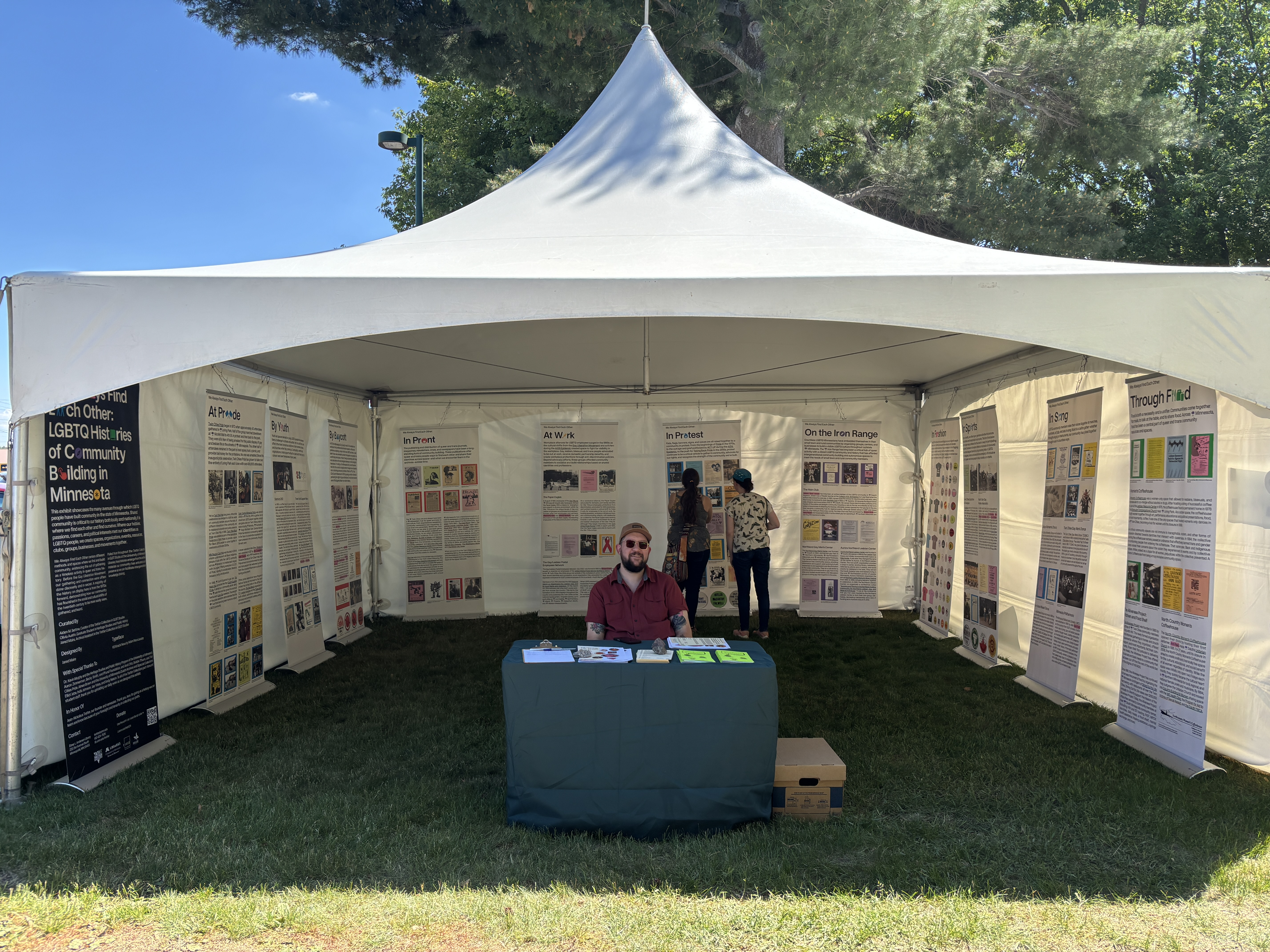
Exhibit: LGBTQ Histories of Community Building in Minnesota

A travelling exhibition, also referred to as a "travelling exhibit" or a "touring exhibition", is a type of exhibition that is presented at more than one venue.

Temporary exhibitions can bring together objects that might be dispersed among several collections, to reconstruct an original context such as an artist's career or a patron's collection, or to propose connections – perhaps the result of recent research – which give new insights or a different way of understanding items in museum collections. The whole exhibition, usually with associated services, including insurance, shipping, storage, conservation, mounting, set up, etc., can then be loaned to one or more venues to lengthen the life of the exhibition and to allow the widest possible audiences – regionally, nationally or internationally – to experience these objects and the stories they contain. Such collaborations can add interest to museums where displays of permanent collections might change only slowly, helping to provide fresh interpretations or more complete stories and attract new audiences. They also provide fresh ideas and breathing space for organisations which have exhibition spaces but lack permanent collections.

To have more than one location for the same exhibition can benefit the organiser because it can then share a part of the production costs among the venues, so museums and galleries frequently use touring as a cost-efficient way of promoting access to their collections. For organisers and their venues, touring exhibitions are important for sharing ideas (for example, promoting techniques for providing for visitors with visual impairments or producing displays which examine current or topical issues) and materials (especially objects that might not be seen in public frequently or even shown together), as well as resources (human as well as financial). Touring is a way of sharing with like-minded institutions and of achieving economies of scale which allow more ambitious projects to happen.

Travelling exhibitions are often supported by governmental organizations to promote access to knowledge and materials that might not be available locally. To acknowledge the importance of travelling exhibitions, in 1983 the International Council of Museums (ICOM) established the International Committee for Exhibition Exchange (ICEE) as a forum to discuss the different aspects of exhibition development, circulation and exchange.

Examples of Traveling Exhibitions

In celebration of the 200th year birthday of the founder, Louis Vuitton, Louis Vuitton's "200 Trunks, 200 Visionaries: The Exhibition" has gone on an international tour taking off from Asnieres-Sur-Siene, France and has since then traveled to Singapore, Beverly Hills and New York. The Exhibition displays the work of 200 visionaries across many different fields ranging from art to science inspired by the brands iconic trunk.

== See also ==
- Exhibition
- Art exhibition
- Museums Association - UK
- National Touring Exhibitions - UK
- Touring Exhibitions Group - UK
- American Federation of Arts - USA
- International Arts & Artists - USA
- Smithsonian Institution, Traveling Exhibition Service (SITES) - USA
