= Hans-Martin Hinz =

German historian

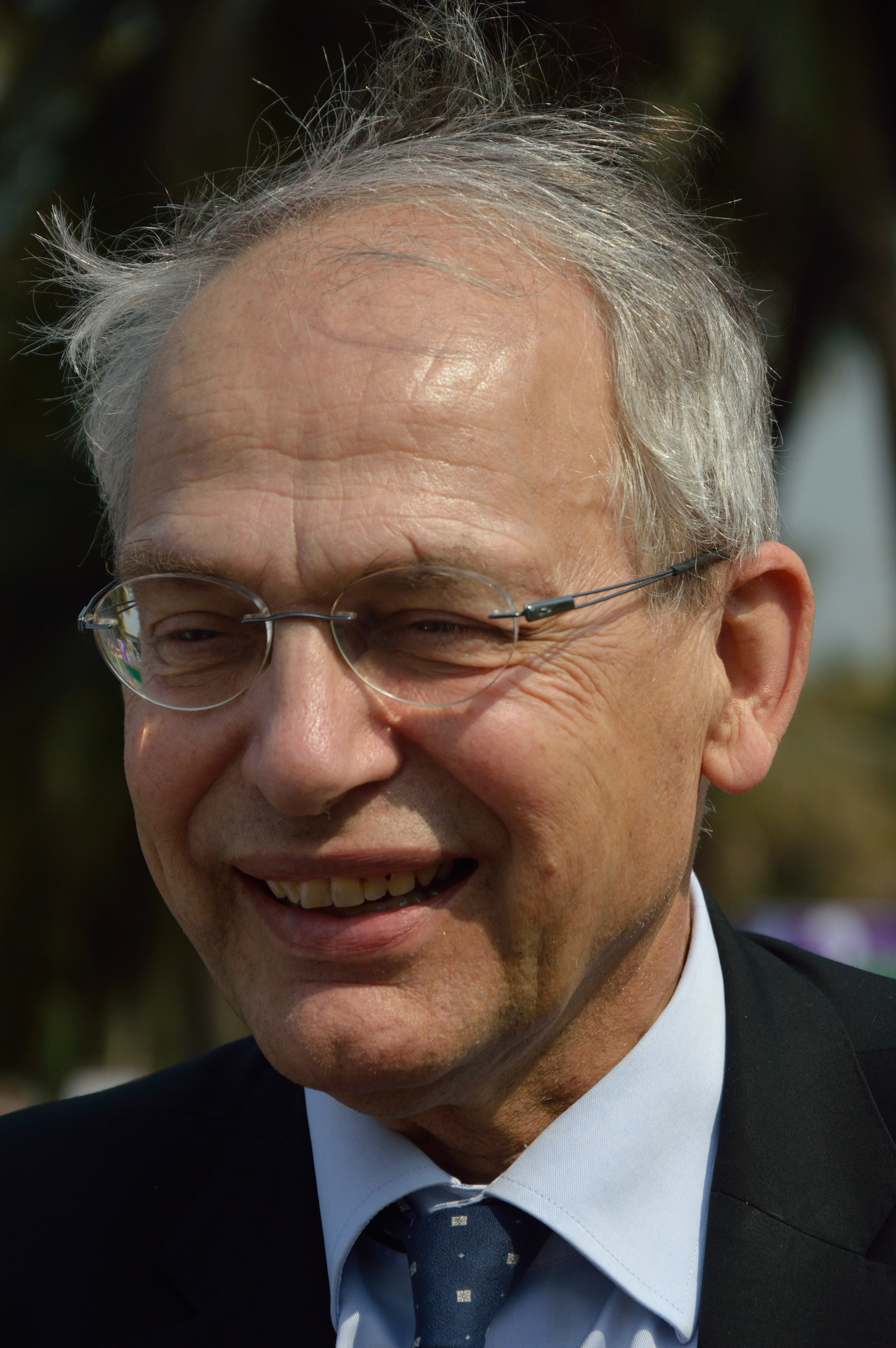
Hans-Martin Hinz in Kolkata

Hans-Martin Hinz (born July 31, 1947 at Berlin) is a German museum professional. From 2010 to 2016 he was President of the International Council of Museums (ICOM).

== Career ==
=== Early years ===
Hans-Martin Hinz completed a commercial apprenticeship and worked then in the tourism branch from 1963 to 1967. He acted as manager of a youth association in Berlin from 1968 to 1970 and earned his university entrance qualifications through the so-called second education route from 1970 to 1972. Hinz studied History, Geography, Pedagogics and Philosophy at the Free University of Berlin from 1972 to 1978, followed by receiving his doctorate in Geography with the aid of a study and doctoral scholarship (for gifted students) from the Cusanuswerk, Bonn. As a high-school teacher, he taught History, Social Studies, Political World Studies and Geography in the years from 1982 to 1984.

Hinz began his career in the cultural field as a research associate at the Senate Administration for Cultural Affairs, Berlin from 1985 to 1991, where he played a part above all in the founding of the "Deutsches Historisches Museum" (DHM) in the year 1987. He was also involved in the evaluation of museums and memorial sites in East and West Berlin after the opening of the Berlin Wall in 1989.

The DHM became the core of his professional activity, where he contributed significantly as department director and senior member of the management in the years from 1991 to 2000 and from 2002 to 2012 for the build-up of the new national museum. He was responsible for the politically important committee work at this time and for the external representation of the museum, working in such committees and advisory boards as the German-French expert commission for the repatriation of cultural assets that had been displaced in the war as well as the Federal Commission for Memorial Museums. He was also responsible for the museum’s national and international scholarly events and for the preparation of content and organisation for the founding of further museums and memorials in Berlin as well as the preparation of architectural competitions. His area of activities also included press and public relations work as well as marketing for the museum. He represented the museum in national and international museum associations. He curated several international exhibitions, where he implemented the key concept of the DHM, namely to represent German history in its international context and in a multi-perspectival way.

Hinz was called to the field of cultural politics and became Secretary of state for Culture in the Berlin Senate Administration for Science, Research and Culture and thus director of the office and chairperson of the umbrella organisations of various cultural institutions from 2000 to 2001.

=== The International Council of Museums (ICOM) and Hinz ===
Since 1995, Prof. Dr Hans-Martin Hinz has occupied several positions within ICOM. In 1995, he became board member of the International Committee of Archaeology and History (ICMAH) and of ICOM Germany. He was also the representative member of Germany in the Central European ICOM (CEICOM) between 1998 and 2004.

From 1998 to 2004, he was President of ICOM Germany, and Vice-President of the International Association of Museums of History, an affiliated organisation of ICOM since 2005. Between 2002 and 2005, he was President of ICOM Europe.

Prof. Dr Hans-Martin Hinz became a member of the ICOM Executive Council in 2004. In the same time, he was Co-President of the Working Group on Cultural Tourism, and member of the Ethics Committee. In 2010, he was elected President of ICOM during the organisation’s 25th General Assembly, held in Shanghai, China, replacing the outgoing President of ICOM, Ms. Alissandra Cummins.

In taking this position in 2010, the new President highlighted the role of ICOM as "a global player, representing common ethical and professional values all over the world". He stated that "the work of committees has created a worldwide forum for international, transcontinental and intercultural dialogue. It is the core of ICOM’s work and has to be reinforced and strengthened […]. In presenting ourselves to a wider public, we must continue to increase the awareness of our issues and highlight the significance of museums as sites of social encounter".

In 2013, Prof. Dr Hans-Martin Hinz was elected for a second three-year mandate during ICOM’s 28th General Assembly in Rio de Janeiro, Brazil.

For the years following his election, ICOM’s President aimed "to strengthen support for museums and museum professionals in areas that are under-represented in ICOM, like Latin America or Africa". He pointed out that "The majority of ICOM members are in Europe and it’s very important that we also address the needs of museum professionals in developing countries. ICOM needs to give priority to developing its presence and services in those areas". Since 2017, he has been programme director of the ICOM International Training Center for Museum Studies, Peking and was jury member for the European Museum of the Year Award, EMYA (2017-2018).

=== Later years ===
In Germany, Hinz was chairperson of the scientific advisory board of the Stiftung Stadtmuseum Berlin from 2004 to 2008, chairperson of the Association of Historical Research Institutions (AHF) in Munich from 2003 to 2012 and Executive Board member of the Society for Geography in Berlin from 2007 to 2019. He was a member of the German Cultural Council from 1999 to 2004 as well as on the board of the House of History of Baden-Württemberg from 2009 to 2012. He also heads several exhibition advisory boards.

Hinz was jury member for the European Museum of the Year Award, EMYA, from 2017 to 2018. He served as judge for the non-monetary architectural competition for the permanent exhibition of the Austrian House of History in Vienna (2017) and was judge of the international competition of national award winners THE BEST IN HERITAGE, Dubrovnik (2018). He chaired the jury for the Belarusian Museum Forum (2019) and was consultant for an EU-cultural project from 2013 to 2016. He was Project-Ambassador of an exhibition in Venlo, The Netherlands, from 2020 to 2022, and keynote speaker on several national and international conferences.

He is currently chairperson of the scientific advisory board of the ″Sudentendeutsches Museum″ in Munich as well as member of board of directors at the ″Curt-Engelhorn-Foundation″, Mannheim, and the ″Foundation for Comparative European Overseas History″, Bamberg. He is as well member of the experts-group of the KMK for the ″European Heritage Label″. He functions as well as editorial board member of several professional publications.

Hinz has contributed more than 220 national and international publications, especially on the topic of museums, and has acted as editor of exhibition catalogues and symposia documentations as well as articles on history and geography didactics and on the work of museum associations.

Hans-Martin Hinz lives in Berlin and is married to Hella Hinz.

=== Distinction ===
On 4 September 2014, Prof. Dr Hans-Martin Hinz was honoured by the President of the Federal Republic of Germany Joachim Gauck with the “Order of Merit of the Federal Republic of Germany”.

In the year 2013, the Free State of Bavaria appointed Hinz as honorary professor. He taught mainly Museology in the faculty of Modern and Contemporary History at the University of Bayreuth.
