= Arts of Mankind =

Series of art history survey books

The Arts of Mankind (in French L'Univers des formes), an ambitious series of art history survey books founded in 1958 for the French publisher Gallimard by André Malraux, who edited many of the volumes in collaboration with art historian Georges Salles. Over 40 volumes have appeared to date; roughly half have been translated into English, as follows:

- Sumer: The Dawn of Art, by André Parrot
- The Arts of Assyria, by André Parrot
- The Birth of Greek Art, by Pierre Demargne
- Carolingian Art, by Jean Hubert, Jean Porcher and WF Volbach
- African Art, by André Parrot
- The Studios and Styles of the Italian Renaissance: Italy 1460–1500, by André Chastel
- Europe of the Invasions, by Jean Hubert
- Archaic Greek Art 620–480 B.C., by Jean Charbonneaux, Roland Martin, and Francois Villard
- Classical Greek Art 480–330 B.C., by Jean Charbonneaux, Roland Martin, and Francois Villard
- Hellenistic Art 330–50 B.C, by Jean Charbonneaux
- The Arts of the South Pacific, by Jean Guiart
- The View Painters of Europe, by Giuliano Briganti
- Rome: the Center of power, by Ranuccio Bianchi Bandinelli
- Rome: the Late Empire, Roman art AD 200–400, by Ranuccio Bianchi Bandinelli
- Early Christian Art: from the Rise of Christianity to the Death of Theodosius, by André Grabar
- Persian art, the Parthian and Sassanian Dynasties, 249 B.C. – 651 A.D., by Charles K. Wilkinson
- Nineveh and Babylon, by André Parrot
- The Flowering of the Italian Renaissance, by André Chastel
- The Golden Age of Justinian, from the death of Theodosius to the rise of Islam, by André Grabar
- The Art of Ancient Iran: from its origins to the time of Alexander the Great, by Roman Ghirshman
