= Museum Service of France =

The Museum Service of France (French: Service des Musées de France) is a central government service run by France's Ministry of Culture. It applies French government policy on museums. It was formed in 2009 by merging the direction générale des Patrimoines et de l'Architecture and the direction des Musées de France (DMF). It is based at 6 rue des Pyramides in central Paris.

== Structure ==
It consists of:

- the inspection générale des musées ;
- collections department
- cultural diffusion, PR and education department
- professional and HR department
- architecture, museology and teams department
- financial, legal and general department
- communications mission
- security mission
- chargé de mission for Europe and overseas.

The service des musées de France consists of :

- deputy director of collections :
  - office for cataloguing and the circulation of cultural goods ;
  - office for acquisitions, restoration, preventive conservation and research ;
  - office for the digital dissemination of collections ;
- deputy director of museum policy :
  - office for investment policy ;
  - office for innovation and technical advice ;
  - office for the direction of national museums ;
  - office for territorial networks ;
  - office for professional networks

== Directors of Musées de France ==
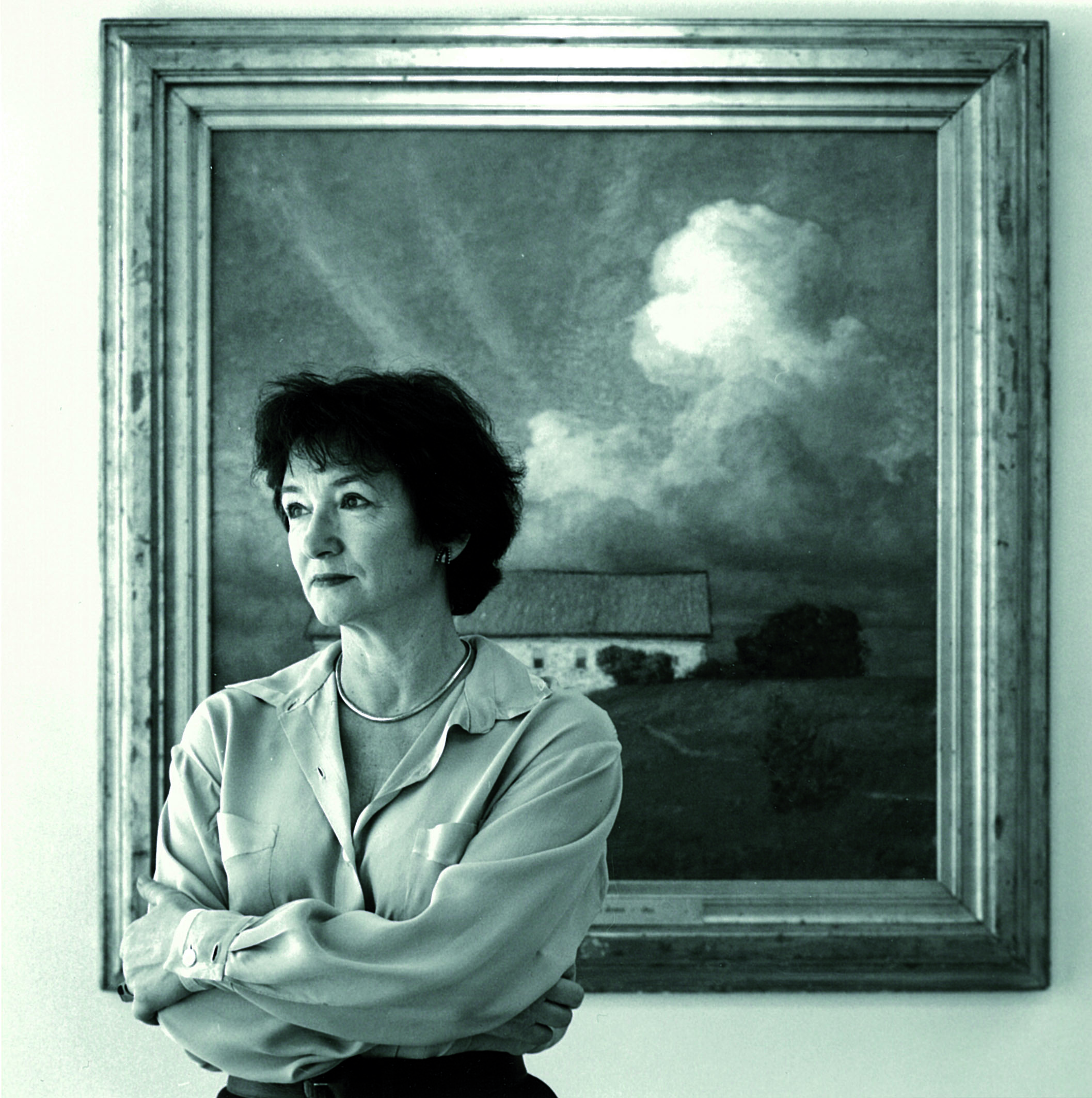
Françoise Cachin, director of Musées de France in 1996.

Its directors were:

- 1944 : Georges Salles (1889–1966)
- 1957 : Edmond Sidet (1912–2002)
- 1960 : Henri Seyrig (1895–1973)
- 1962 : Jean Chatelain (1916–1996)
- 1975 : Emmanuel Jacquin de Margerie (1924–1991)
- 1977 : Hubert Landais (1921–2006)
- 1987 : Olivier Chevrillon (1929–2013)
- 1990 : Jacques Sallois (1941–)
- 1994 : Françoise Cachin (1936–2011)
- 2001 : Francine Mariani-Ducray (1954–)
- 2008-2018 : Marie-Christine Labourdette (1961–)
- 2019 : Anne-Solène Rolland (1982–)
- 2022-present : Christelle Creff (1970–).

== Bibliography ==
- Beaulieu, Bernard; Dardy, Michèle (2002). "Direction des musées de France". Histoire administrative du ministère de la Culture, 1959-2002 - Les services de l'administration centrale. Travaux et documents (in French). Paris: Comité d'histoire du ministère de la culture et des institutions culturelles / La Documentation française. p. 95–103. ISBN 2-11-005282-1.
