= Philip Hendy =

British curator

Sir Philip Anstiss Hendy (27 September 1900 – 6 September 1980) was a British art curator who worked both in Britain and overseas, notably the United States.

In 1923, he began his career in art administration as an Assistant Keeper and lecturer at the Wallace Collection in London, despite his having no formal training in art history. His entries for the Wallace Collection's new catalogue and articles for The Burlington Magazine so impressed the administration of the Isabella Stewart Gardner Museum in Boston, Massachusetts that the trustees of the museum agreed to fund Hendy's three-year stay in Italy, during which he compiled the Gardner catalogue.

From the Gardner Museum Hendy went on to curate the Boston Museum of Fine Arts in 1930, where he spent his budget of $10,000 on works by modern European masters including Georges Braque, Gino Severini and Walter Sickert. In 1933, he resigned from the Museum of Fine Arts after a quarrel with the trustees who disapproved of his purchase of Matisse's 1903 nude Carmelina. Returning to Britain, he was appointed director of the Leeds City Art Gallery in 1934.

The threat posed to Leeds during the Second World War caused the gallery's works of art to be evacuated to a more rural setting in Temple Newsam House. The task of relocation, and the subsequent rehanging of the paintings in their new 18th-century surroundings, was undertaken by Hendy, whose work there caught the attention of the Director of the National Gallery, Kenneth Clark. Clark, who had similarly overseen the removal of the National Gallery pictures to safety in a North Wales quarry during the war years, appointed Hendy as his successor in 1946.

Hendy's directorship of the National Gallery was marred by criticisms from the press in 1947, after a controversial exhibition of cleaned pictures when it was claimed that many paintings had been ruined by the Gallery's chief restorer Helmut Ruhemann, and in 1961, when the theft of Goya's portrait of the Duke of Wellington called the quality of security at the Gallery into question.

Knighted in 1950, Hendy retired from the National Gallery in 1967 and from 1968 until 1971 he was a supervisor at the Israel Museum in Jerusalem.

Philip Hendy was Slade Professor of Fine Art at the University of Oxford in 1937 and 1942. He was President of the International Council of Museums (ICOM) from 1959 to 1965. He was a member of the committee of the Italian Art and Archives Rescue Fund from 1966 until his retirement from the National Gallery in 1967.

== Bibliography ==
- Loan Exhibition of One Hundred Colonial Portraits, Museum of Fine Arts, Boston, 1930
- Catalogue of the exhibited paintings and drawings [of the] Isabella Stewart Gardner Museum, 1931
- The National Gallery London, 1955
- Masaccio: Frescoes in Florence, 1956
- Art Treasures of the National Gallery, London, 1960
- Piero della Francesca and the Early Renaissance, 1968
- Art Treasures in the British Isles: Monuments, Masterpieces, Commissions, and Collections, 1969

Cultural offices
Preceded by Georges Salles	President of the International Council of Museums; 1959–1965	Succeeded by Arthur van Schendel
