= Anne-Catherine Robert-Hauglustaine =

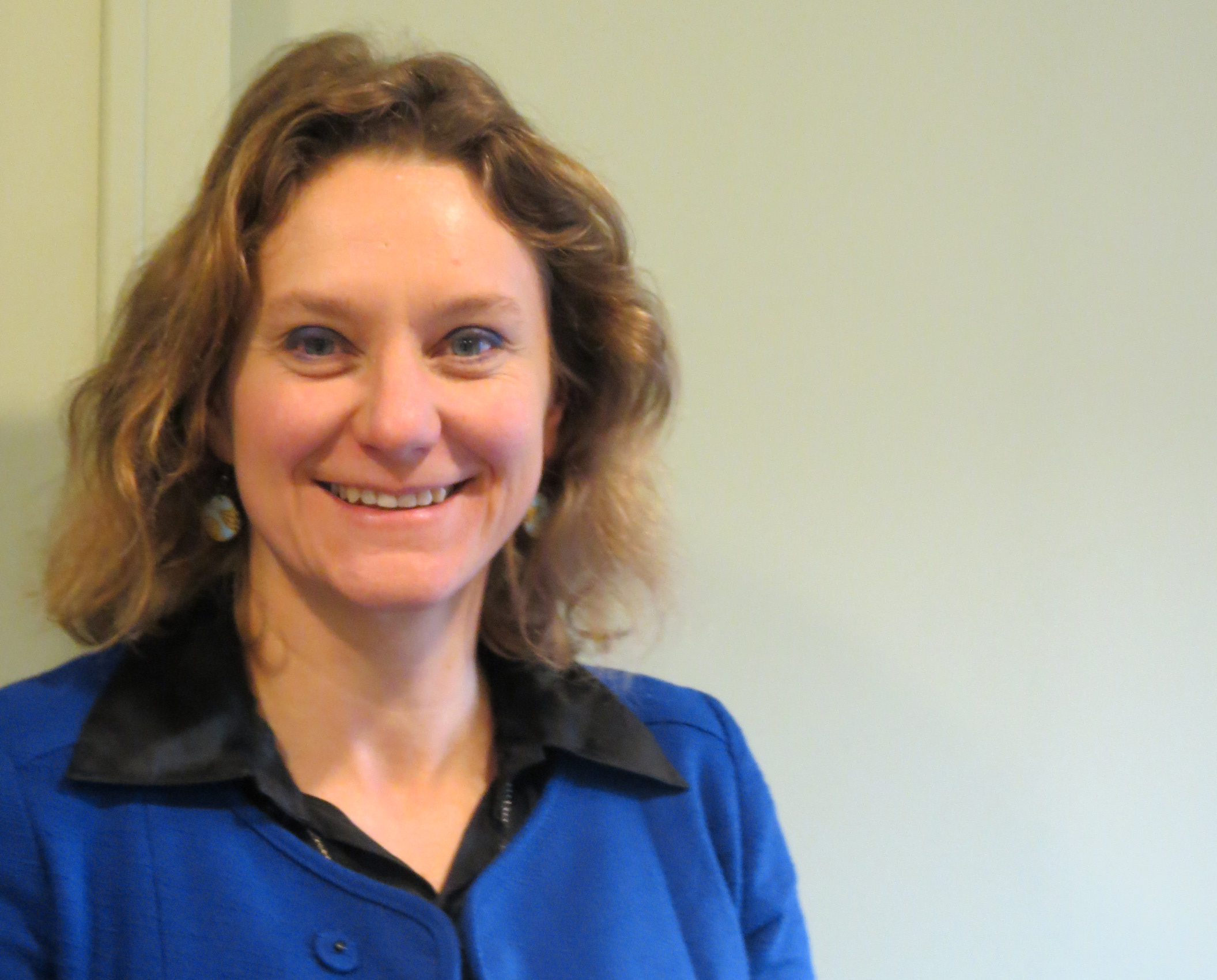
Anne-Catherine Robert-Hauglustaine, Director General of ICOM.

Anne-Catherine Robert is a Belgian museum professional and lecturer at Université Paris 1 Panthéon-Sorbonne who also served as Director General of the International Council of Museums (ICOM), from May 2014 through November 2016.

== Career ==
In 1997, Anne-Catherine Robert received a Ph.D. in History of Science and Technology from the Ecole des hautes etudes en sciences sociales (EHESS) in France. After completing her thesis, she began post-doctoral training at the University of Colorado Boulder, United States.

In November 1999, A.-C. Robert became Curator of Transport Collections at the Musée des arts et métiers in Paris, France, where the Museum Director, Dr. Dominique Ferriot, entrusted her with the presentation of the collections of the Saint-Martin-des-Champs priory. When the museum opened in November 2000, Anne-Catherine Robert became Director of Exhibitions and Publications. She has curated many exhibitions, including Parcours de Centraliens, inventeurs et entrepreneurs (Paris, Musée des arts et métiers, 3 November 2004 – 6 March 2005), La Lumière, au siècle des Lumières et aujourd’hui (Nancy, France, Galeries Poirel, 16 September – 16 December 2005), and Benjamin Franklin, homme de sciences et homme du monde (Paris, Musée des arts et métiers, 4 December 2007 – 30 March 2008). Between 2001 and 2008, she served as Editor in Chief of the museum’s journal. She was also Head of Sponsoring and Partnerships, and was part of the Musée des arts et métiers management team.

From January 2008 to May 2014, Anne-Catherine Robert was Associate Director of the Jardin des sciences de l’Université de Strasbourg. In this role, she led the future project of the Strasbourg University Science Museum, which includes improved collection displays, and the construction of a new planetarium, a temporary exhibition venue, and a science center. She also supported the Université de Strasbourg’s application for “Plan Campus”, which resulted in an allocation of €375m from the French Government.

In 2013, Robert- contributed to the ATOUTS project, which aims to promote interest in science among young people. She also coordinated the organizing committee of the “My thesis in 180 seconds” competition in Alsace, France, which was organised by the Université de Strasbourg, in collaboration with the Centre national de la recherche scientifique (CNRS) and the Conférence des Présidents d'Université (CPU).

She was also a member of the management team of several European projects such as Places, a project that aims to develop a network of 200 cities of scientific culture in Europe; 2-WAYS, a project of science parliaments for European youth; and EUCU.NET, a study project on children’s universities, in 2008.

Anne-Catherine Robert was also appointed as an expert in scientific and technical culture matters by the French Regional Councils of Rhône-Alpes and Alsace.

She is part of the scientific committee of the journal Culture et Musées, which publishes the results of research in the fields of publics, institutions and mediations related to Culture.

== Professional affiliations ==
Anne-Catherine Robert is part of the scientific committee of the “Journées Hubert Curien de la culture scientifique et technique”, a symposium held by the Université de Lorraine, in parallel with Science & You. In 2009, she was elected to serve on the board of the European Science Events Association. She was appointed Vice-President of the organisation from 2012 to 2014.

== The International Council of Museums ==
From 2007 to 2010, Anne-Catherine Robert represented the Musée des Arts et Métiers within ICOM France, the French Committee of ICOM. Between 2010 and 2013, she became President of the ICOM International Committee on Exhibitions and Exchanges (ICEE), and in August 2013, she was appointed ICOM Treasurer during the organisation’s 28th General Assembly, held in Rio de Janeiro, Brazil.

Robert's appointment as ICOM Director General was approved on 12 December 2013, during the 127th session of the ICOM Executive Council in Paris, France. After a transitional period, she relinquished her role as ICOM Treasurer to replace Ms. Hanna Pennock, the Acting General Director of ICOM at the time. In taking this position, the new Director General highlighted how important it is for ICOM to reassert itself “as a reference institution for museums all over the world. A new memorandum will be signed with UNESCO and new programmes will be put in place over the next months in order to reinforce the role of ICOM and its international experts. ICOM’s rapid reaction to disasters and other dangers that affect museums, including illicit trafficking, is another major asset that we should highlight. Active collaboration with other organisations that work in the cultural and heritage sector is essential for the development of ICOM. The 32,000 members of our organisation must be able to take advantage of ICOM’s programmes, of the potential of this exceptional international network and of the content developed by ICOM’s various committees.”.

“Concerning programmes like the Blue Shield, we have to continue the important work that has already been done in the interest of our members. ICOM must develop its support for its members” she concluded.

== Teaching ==
Between 1997 and 1998, Anne-Catherine Robert was Professor at the University of Colorado Boulder and taught the History of Sciences and Technology at the University of Denver’s Graduate School for International Studies. From 2000 to 2003, she was Associate Lecturer for a course on the History of European Engineers in the US (18th and 19th centuries) at the Université de Technologie de Troyes, France. In 2004, she taught History of Physics at Paris-Sud University in Orsay, France.

Since September 2002, Robert has taught at Université Paris 1 Panthéon-Sorbonne in Paris, France. On 1 July 2014, she was appointed Associated Professor at the Training and Research Unit of History at Université Paris 1 Panthéon-Sorbonne.

== Prizes and distinctions ==
In 2002, Anne-Catherine Robert received the Prix Montgolfier for the exhibition Visages de l’industrie, held in the Musée des arts et métiers in 2001, which subsequently traveled throughout France in 2002. In 2005, the book 1929–2004. Parcours de Centraliens, which she co-authored with Jean-François Belhoste, received the Silver Top-Com distinction in the book category. The following year she received the same distinction in the journal category as Editor in Chief of La Revue du Musée des arts et métiers.

Through her work on the exhibition Benjamin Franklin, homme de science, homme du monde, Robert received a fellowship from the American Philosophical Society in 2006.

== Bibliography ==
- Imagining the Balkans. Identities and Memory in the long 19th century (dir.), Exhibition catalogue, UNESCO/ICOM/ICEE, Slovenia, 2013.
- Benjamin Franklin, homme de science, homme du monde (dir.), Paris Musées, 2007, 223p.
- co-authored with Jean-François Belhoste, 1929-2004, Parcours de Centraliens, Paris, 2005, 128p.
- co-authored with Catherine Malaval, Paroles d'experts, 1909–1999, la Soudure Autogène Française, Créapress éditions, Paris, 1999, 128p.
