= André Grabar =

Russian-French art historian (1896–1990)

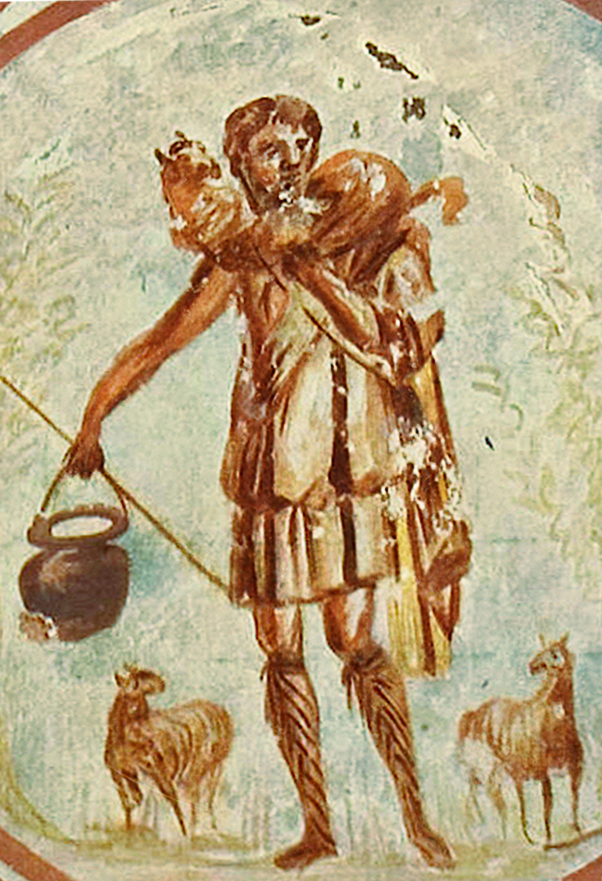
3rd century tomb painting of Christ as the Good Shepherd with the cock (Matthew 26:75, Mark 14:72, Luke 22:61) on His right, studied by Grabar

André Nicolaevitch Grabar (Ukrainian: Андрій Миколайович Грабар; July 26, 1896, Kyiv – October 5, 1990) was a historian of art of Ukrainian origine, studed Romanesque art and the art of the Eastern Roman Empire and the Bulgarian Empire. Born in Kyiv and educated in Kyiv, Saint Petersburg and Odessa, he spent his career in Bulgaria (1919–1922), France (1922–1958) and the United States (1958–1990). Grabar was one of the 20th-century founders of the study of the art and icons of the Eastern Roman Empire, adopting a synthetic approach embracing history, theology and interactions with the Islamic world.

His son Oleg Grabar also became an art historian, with a special interest in Islamic art and architecture.

== Life ==
André Nicolaevitch Grabar was born on July 26, 1896, in Kiev, the Russian Empire. His father was Nicolas (Nikolay S.) Grabar (1852-1924), a lawyer and State Counsellor at the Court of Cassation of St Petersburg. His mother was Baroness Elisabeth de Prittwitz (1866-1924), an artist of German origin.

He was educated in Kiev and at first thought of becoming an artist, joining the studio of a Kiev painter on leaving school. Deciding that he did not have sufficient talent he turned to the study of art history, although he remained an amateur painter. He began his university studies in Kiev, moving to Petrograd in 1915. While there he began to think about the connection between religious life and art, which would become his life's work. Discussing the connection between the Orthodox Christian faith and conservative aesthetics of the creators of Christian icons, Grabar explained, "Their role can be compared to that of musical performers in our day, who do not feel that their importance is diminished by the fact that they limit their talent to the interpretation of other people's work, since each interpretation contains original nuances." He left St. Petersburg in November 1917, a few days after the Bolsheviks seized power in the October Revolution, and completed his studies in Odessa in 1919.

Grabar realized it would not be possible for him to pursue his career in what was becoming the Soviet Union and he left for Sofia, Bulgaria in January 1920. He spent three years surveying the medieval monuments of the country for the National Museum, often in "harsh conditions". He took many trips through the countryside, often by donkey or on foot.

He moved to Strasbourg, France in 1922, first teaching the Russian language. He married Julie Ivanova (whom he had met in Bulgaria) in 1923; she was a medical doctor. He earned a PhD at the University of Strasbourg in 1928, and taught art history there until 1937. He wrote most of his books in the French language, but many of his more than 30 titles were translated into English and other languages.

From 1937 to 1958 he became the center of a school of young art historians, as a Director of Studies in Christian Archaeology at the Ecole Pratique des Hautes Etudes (1937–1946) and as a professor at the Collège de France (1946–1958).

In 1958 Grabar moved to the United States, becoming a central figure at the Dumbarton Oaks Institute of Harvard University. He was a research professor at Dumbarton Oaks from 1950 to 1964. In 1961 he gave the A. W. Mellon lectures in the Fine Arts at the National Gallery of Art in Washington, DC, published as Christian Iconography: A Study of Its Origins (1968). He became a member of the American Academy of Arts and Sciences.

He died in Paris on October 5, 1990.

His son Oleg Grabar (1929–2011) was also a historian of art, specializing in Islamic art. He also had another son named Nicolas.

Andre Grabar's papers are part of the Dumbarton Oaks collection.

== Selected works ==
- L'Eglise de Boiana (1924)
- La peinture religieuse en Bulgarie (1928)
- Recherche sur les Influences Orientales dans l'Art Balkanique (1928)
- La Sainte Face de Laon (1936)
- Martyrium (1943, 1946)
- La Peinture byzantine (1953)
- Byzantine Painting: Historical and Critical Study (1953. Geneva: Skira)
- L'Iconoclasme (1957)
- Early Medieval Painting from the Fourth to the Eleventh Century: Mosaics and Mural Painting (1957. New York: Skira)
- Ampoules de Terre Sainte (Monza, Bobbio) (1958. Paris, C. Klincksieck) (The standard monograph, with 61 photographs and 70 pages of commentary.) (See Leroy review, below.)
- Romanesque Painting from the Eleventh to the Thirteenth Century (1958. New York: Skira)
- The Treasures of Venice. Michelangelo Murano and André Grabar (1963), Editions d'Art Albert Skira, Geneva, 218 pp.
- Byzantine and Early Medieval Painting (1965. New York: Viking Press)
- The Beginnings of Christian Art, 200–395 (=Arts of Mankind; 9) (1967. London: Thames & Hudson)
- Christian Iconography: a Study of its Origins, A.W. Mellon Lectures in the Fine Arts, 1961. (1968. Princeton, NJ: Princeton U.P.)
- Leroy, Jules, Review of André Grabar Les Ampoules de Terre Sainte, Syria. Archéologie, Art et histoire, Vol 36, 1959 (in French)

== See also ==
- Christianity in the 3rd century#Early iconography
- Cross-in-square
- Monza ampullae
