= Museum of Engines and Mechanisms =

This is the english page of Museum of Engines of the University of Palermo

Coordinates: 38.1048°N 13.3476°E

- Museo storico dei motori e dei meccanismi
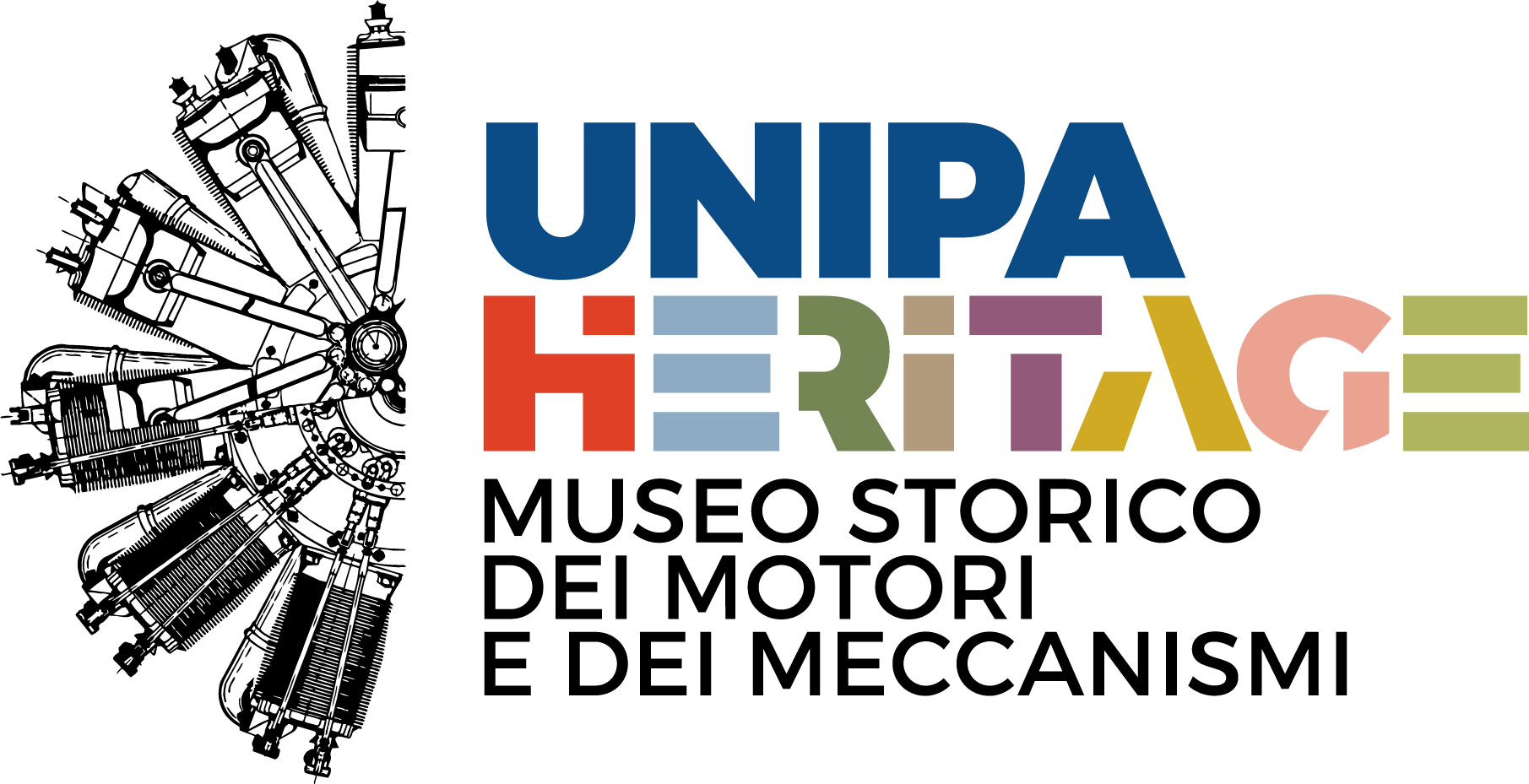

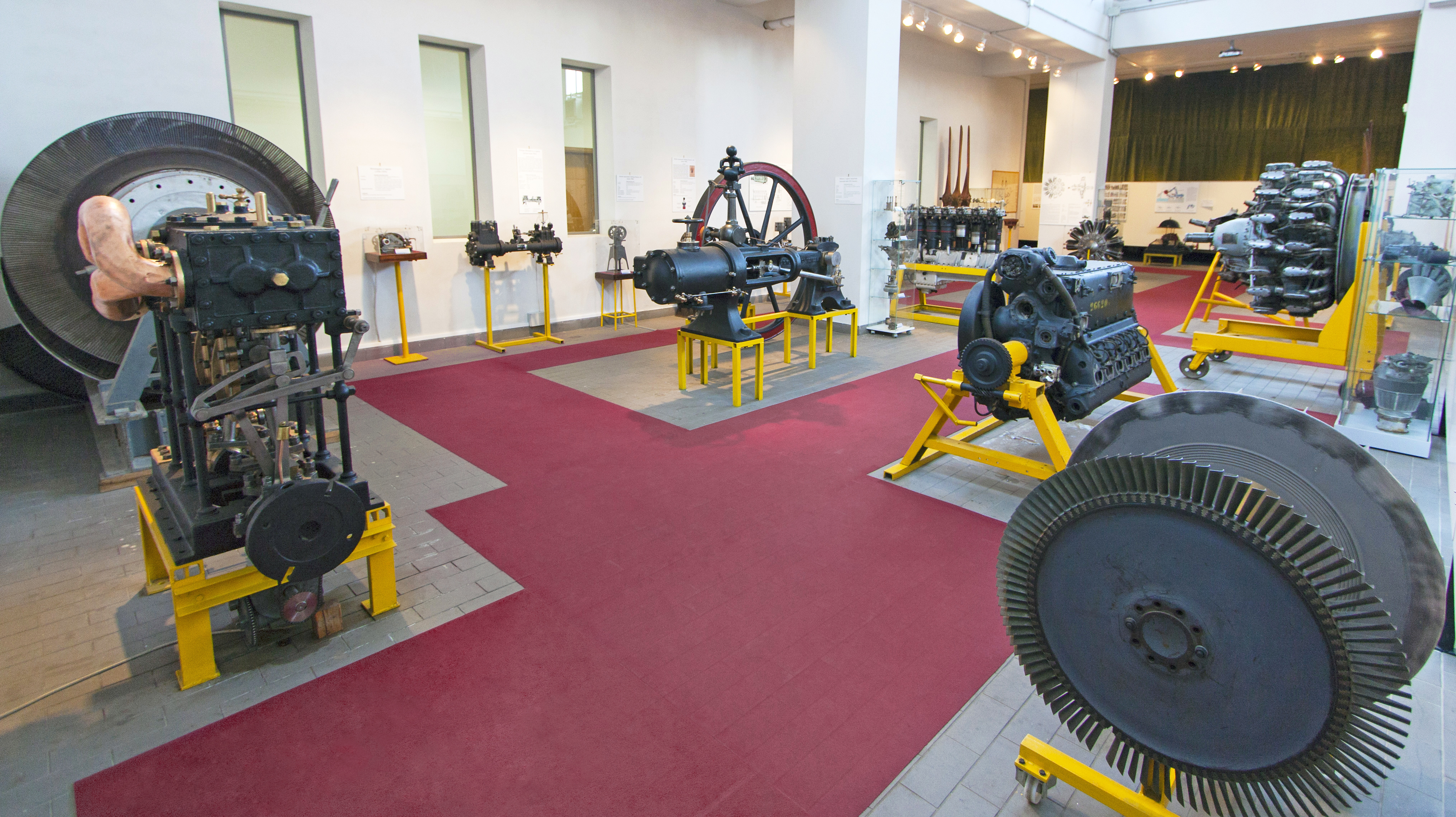
- One of the exhibit areas of the Museum
- Established: February 25, 2011
- Location: Italy, Palermo
- Type: Science and technology museum
- Collections: Engines and technical-scientific instrumentation
- Founders: Dr. Giuseppe Genchi, with the contribution of the technician Beniamino Drago and Prof. Riccardo Monastero
- Owner: University of Palermo
- Website: www.museomotori.unipa.it

The Museum of Engines and Mechanisms is an Italian academic museum located in Palermo, Italy, and is part of the Museum System of the University of Palermo.

Inaugurated on February 25, 2011, it houses a vast collection of engines and industrial, scientific, and educational equipment used in various research and teaching fields since the second half of the 19th century.

The museum is dedicated to the research, restoration, and dissemination of its heritage, in accordance with the recommendations of ICOM (International Council of Museums). It organizes exhibitions, seminars, workshops, and educational activities and collaborates with other museums, institutions, and associations within the cultural initiatives promoted by the University of Palermo.

On May 31, 2017, the museum was recognized by the American Society of Mechanical Engineers (ASME) with the "Mechanical Engineering Heritage Collection" distinction for its historical, technical, and collection significance.

== History of collection ==
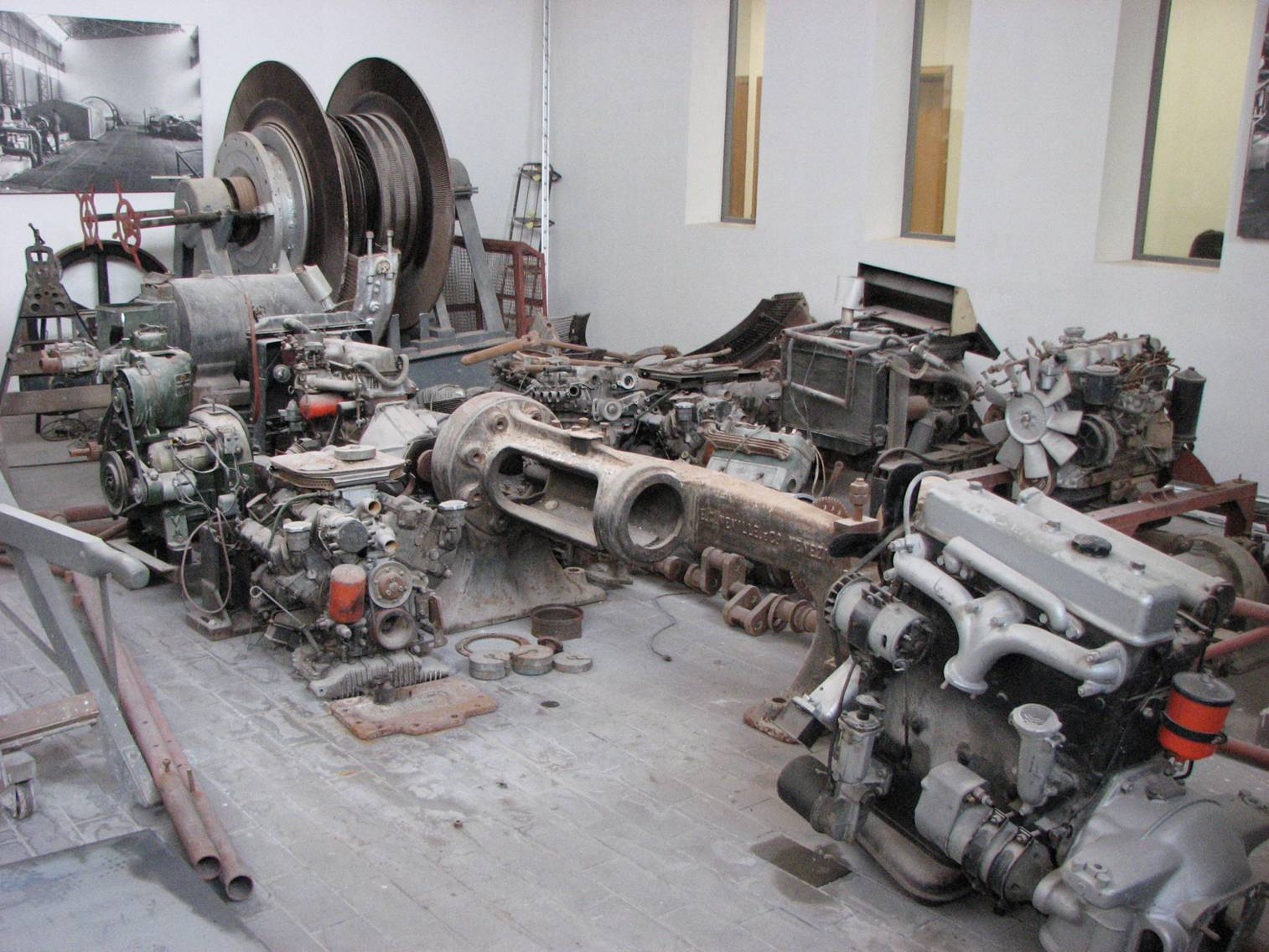
Items in storage prior to restoration, 2008

The museum houses a varied collection of engines and industrial, scientific, and educational equipment, acquired and used in various fields of research and teaching since the second half of the 19th century, following the foundation of the Royal School of Applied Engineering and Architecture of the University of Palermo in 1866.

The collection illustrates the evolution of fluid machines and related studies, covering a range of practical applications, from steam engines to jet engines and modern hybrid systems.

== Stationary engines ==
At the Royal School of Applied Engineering and Architecture in Palermo, early studies on steam engines date back to the mid-19th century, as evidenced by some of the oldest stationary machines and scientific instruments preserved in the museum. The section dedicated to stationary engines also includes hydraulic machines such as Francis, Kaplan, and Pelton turbines, reflecting their importance in the evolution of fluid machine technology over time.

== Automotive engines ==
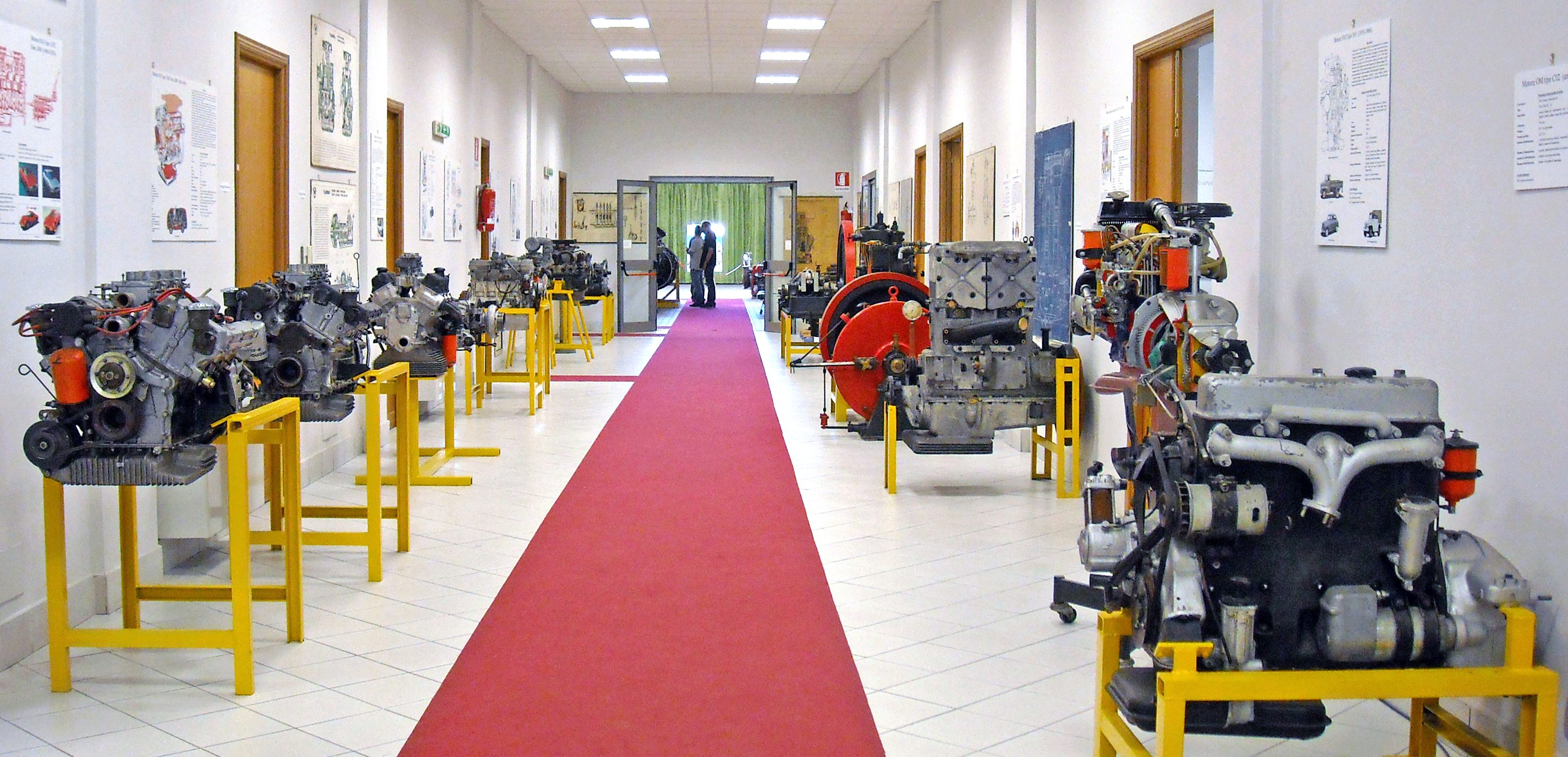
The automotive engines exhibition area

The museum houses a collection of various automotive engines designed for diverse applications. Most of these engines were acquired for research and teaching activities and have gradually been replaced by more modern models currently in use in the University of Palermo's engine laboratory.

== Aircraft engines ==
The museum houses a collection of historically significant aircraft engines. Some of these engines date back to the early days of aviation, including rotary radial-cylinder engines. Some of the oldest specimens come from Germany and were part of a batch of technical equipment transferred to Italy for research purposes after World War I. Among these engines is the French rotary engine "Le Rhône" 9Jby and a rare counter-rotating Siemens-Halske Sh.IIIa engine, representing an advanced step in the evolution of radial-cylinder rotary engines.

== Historic aircraft FIAT G.59 4B ==
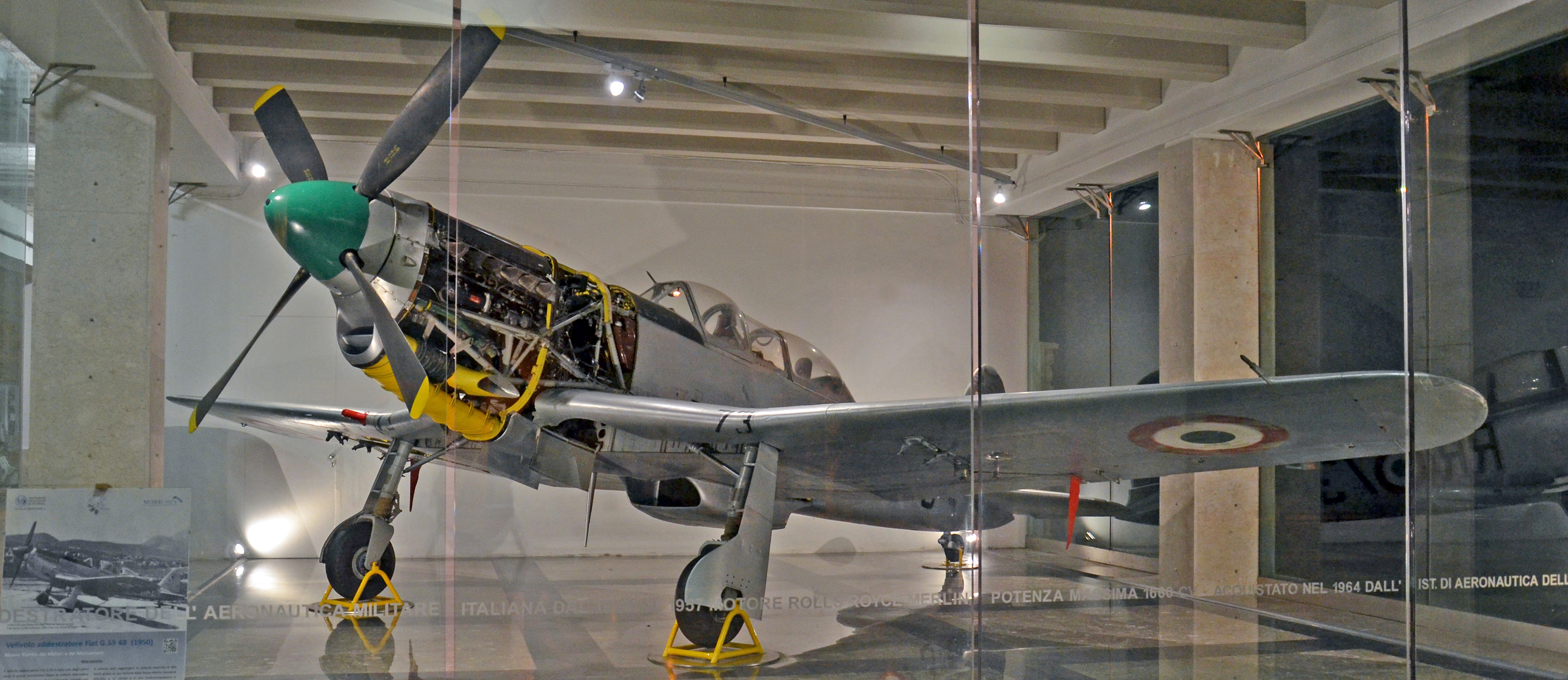
The historic Fiat G.59 4B aircraft displayed in a specially designed case

The museum's collection includes two aircraft: the Lockheed F-104S ASA-M, displayed on the University of Palermo campus, and one of only five surviving FIAT G.59s, which is displayed in a dedicated area of the museum. The FIAT G.59, designed by Italian aeronautical engineer Giuseppe Gabrielli, was one of the last high-performance aircraft equipped with a piston engine and is considered a symbol of the revival of the post-war Italian aerospace industry. It was developed from the FIAT G.55 Centauro, a World War II Italian fighter aircraft.

The FIAT G.59 was produced by FIAT in the early 1950s, with over 180 units made, primarily for the Italian Air Force as an advanced training aircraft. Powered by a Rolls-Royce Merlin V-12 engine of 1,660 hp (model 500-20), the aircraft reached a maximum speed of 609 km/h at 6,400 meters and a maximum ceiling of 12,100 meters.

== Didactic mechanisms ==
Additionally, the museum holds a collection of historical scientific instruments used in engine studies, including measuring devices and various types of engine test benches.

== ASME Landmark ==
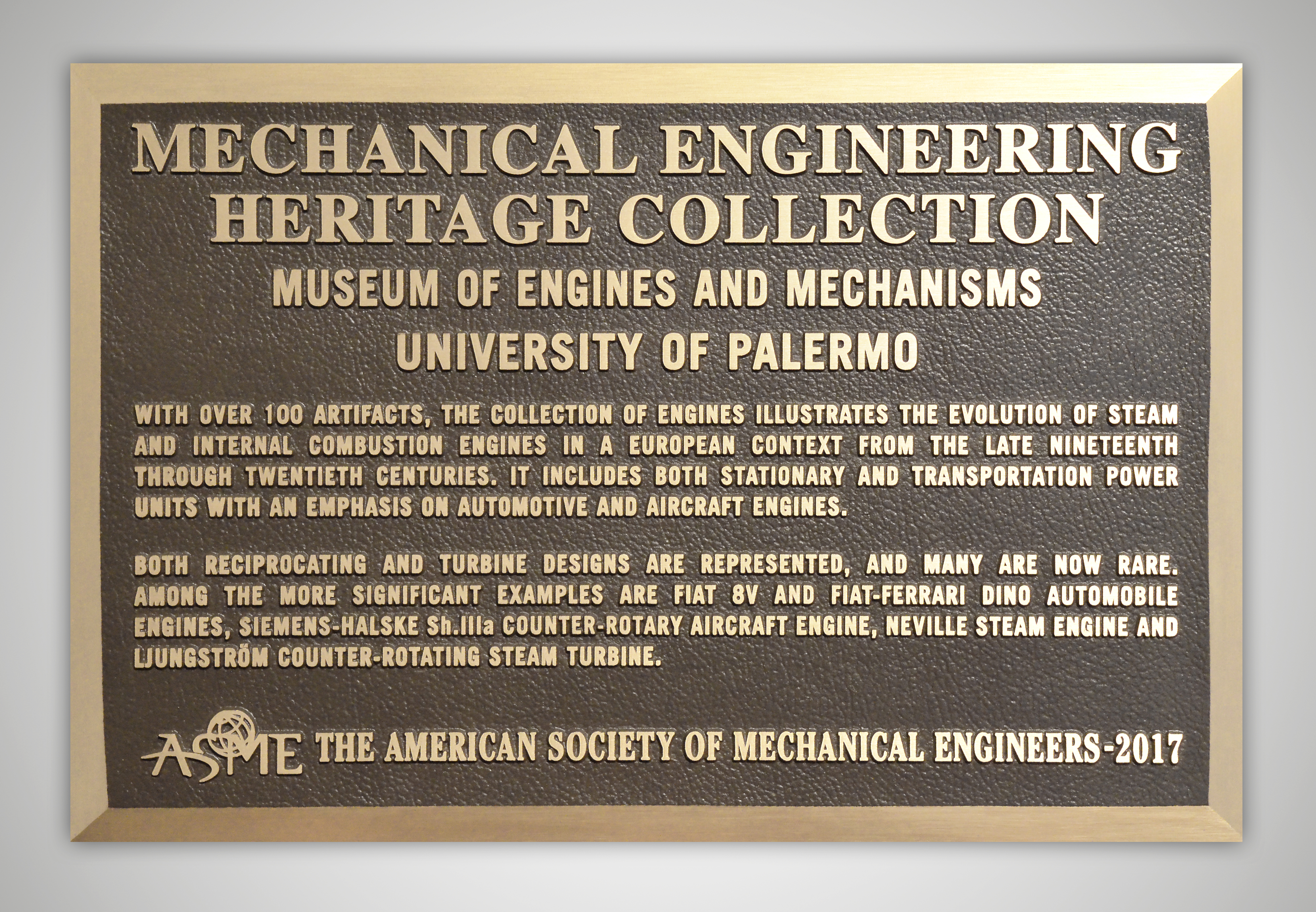
The ASME Landmark plague of the Museum of Engines.

On May 31, 2017, in recognition of its historical, technical, and collection significance, the museum became the first Italian collection to receive the "Mechanical Engineering Heritage Collection" distinction, awarded by the American Society of Mechanical Engineers (ASME).

This recognition is part of the History and Heritage Landmarks program, launched by ASME in 1971.
