= Château de Châteauneuf-sur-Loire =

French château in Loire valley

- Château de Châteauneuf-sur-Loire (French)
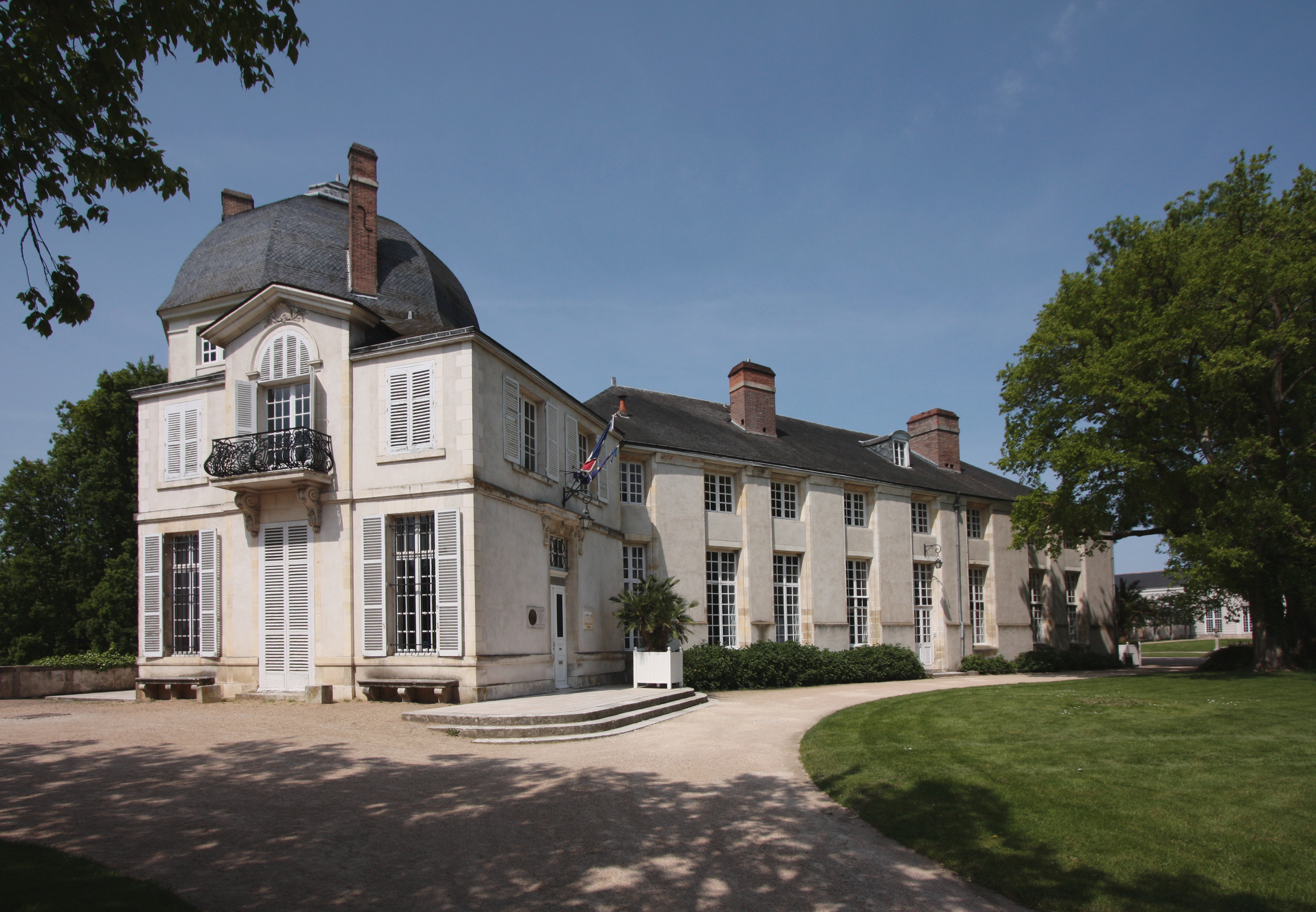
- Gatehouse and square towers from the 16th century

- Location within France Location within Centre-Val de Loire
- 47°51′51″N 2°13′00″E
- Location: Châteauneuf-sur-Loire, Loiret, France

History
- Founded: 17th century

Monument historique
- Type: Registered
- Designated: 1927-06-24, 1942-07-11

The Château de Châteauneuf-sur-Loire is a French castle, built in the 17th and 18th centuries, located in Châteauneuf-sur-Loire in the department of Loiret in the Centre-Val de Loire region.

The Loire Maritime Museum (French: Musée de la Marine de Loire) is located in the old stables of the castle.

== Geography ==
Originally, the castle was built in the former province of Orléanais of the Kingdom of France.

The building is located in the natural region of the Loire Valley, at the corner of the Douves and Aristide-Briand squares, in the town center of the commune, near the north bank of the Loire.

== History ==
The construction of the castle began in the 17th century. Certain parts and structures of the seigneurial residence are made using a yellow calcareous stone from the quarries of the town of Apremont-sur-Allier. The blocks of stone were then transported by waterway via the course of the Allier, then that of the Loire using flat-bottomed boats.

It was bought between 1792 and 1794 by the Orléans architect Benoît Lebrun who had a large part of the building destroyed. It retained only the rotunda, a gallery, the orangery, the outbuildings and the entrance pavilions. He died there on September 29, 1819.

The commune of Châteauneuf-sur-Loire bought the castle in 1926 and set up schools and the town hall there.

== Park ==
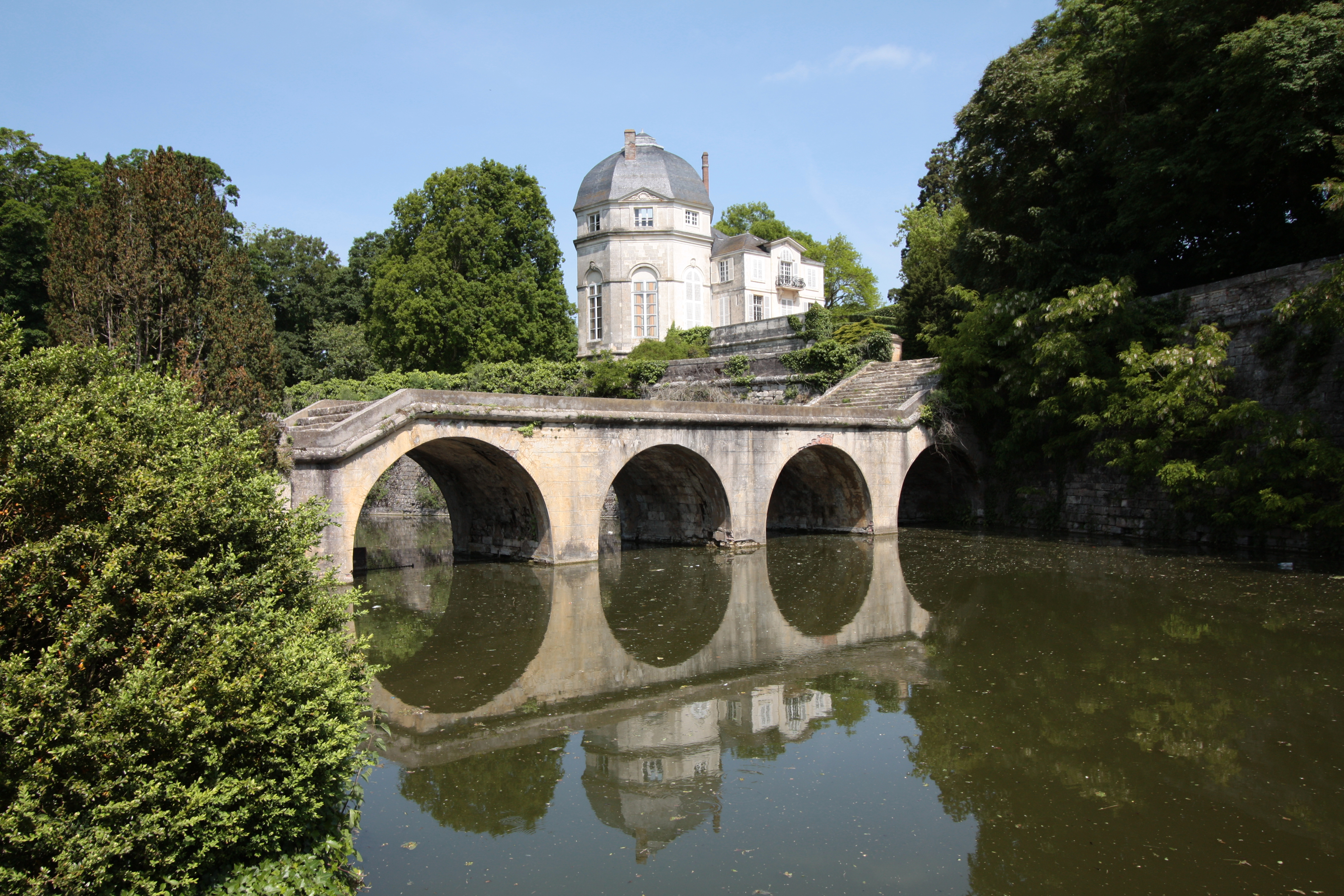
Remaining building of the castle with perron and bridge leading down to the park

The organization of the park, dating from the 17th century, first followed the influence of André Le Nôtre, gardener to the King of France in the 17th century. In 1821, the space was remodeled into an English-style park under the impetus of René Charles Huillard d'Hérou.

The park extends over twenty hectares and includes a river that connects the castle moat to the banks of the Loire.

In 1934, the General Council of Loiret became the owner of the park and managed its development.

Notable flora include the alley of arborescent rhododendrons and azaleas, giant magnolias and tulip trees. The park is home to around 30 remarkable trees, including a Japanese pagoda tree and a Virginia tulip tree registered since June 2009 in the directory of remarkable trees in France.

The reconstruction of the Temple of Love originally built in the park in the 18th century was carried out by students from the Lycée Gaudier-Brzeska in Saint-Jean-de-Braye and inaugurated on February 14, 2009.

In 2010-2011, the General Council of Loiret developed 7 hectares of the park in order to clean up the park's wetlands and connect the promenade to the Loire.
