= Jean Hubert (archaeologist) =

French art historian

- Born: 12 June 1902; Ardentes (Indre), France
- Died: 1 July 1994 (aged 92); Paris, France
- Occupation: Art historian

Jean Hubert (12 June 1902 – 1 July 1994) was a 20th-century French art historian, specializing in religious architecture.

The son and grandsons of chartists, Jean Hubert himself became a student at the École Nationale des Chartes where he supported in 1925 a thesis entituled L'abbaye Notre–Dame de Déols (917–1627) which earned him the degree of archivist paleographer.

He became director of the Departmental Archives of Seine-et-Marne in 1926 and held this position until 1955. He then succeeded Marcel Aubert in the chair of medieval archeology at the École des Chartes (1955–1973).

Jean Hubert was elected a member of the Académie des inscriptions et belles-lettres in 1963. He was also a member of the Société des Antiquaires de France.

== Main publications ==
His bibliography includes 308 items including

- 1967: L'Europe des invasions, with Jean Porcher and Wolfgang Fritz Volbach, Éditions Gallimard, series L'Univers des formes.
- 1968: L'Empire carolingien, with Jean Porcher and Wolfgang Fritz Volbach, Gallimard, series L'Univers des formes, 1968.
- 1985: L'Abbatiale Notre Dame de Déols
