= Georges Salles =

- Born: 24 September 1889; Sèvres, France
- Died: 20 October 1966 (aged 77); Bad Wiessee, Germany
- Occupations: Art historian; museum curator

Georges Salles (24 September 1889 – 20 October 1966) was a 20th-century French art historian and curator.

== Biography ==
A specialist of the East, George Salles led excavations in Iran, Afghanistan, and China. He was then curator at the Asian Arts Department of the Louvre Museum, and in 1941 director of the Guimet Museum. Speaking of the first General Conference of the ICOM, held in Paris in 1948, its president Georges Salles reported that "It has enabled a better understanding of the skills needed in our time by the curator of a museum if he/she is to fulfill h/h duties in a satisfactory manner." Between 1945 and 1957 he was director of the Museums of France. With Jean Cassou, he laid the foundations for a new design of the museum of modern art, to make art available to the greatest number. It is with his support that were made the ceiling by Georges Braque at the Louvre, the fresco of Pablo Picasso and the wall of Joan Miró at the UNESCO, all famous painters of whom he was a friend. Himself a collector, he bought works of young artists such as Mark Tobey. He published a Histoire des Arts de l’Orient, then Au Louvre, scènes de la vie du musée, and Le Regard in 1939. With André Malraux, he headed the series L’Univers des formes.

In 1953, Salles joined the cultural council of the Cultural Circle of Royaumont.

Some editions of Francis Poulenc's Sextet (Poulenc) (1932-1939) include a dedication to Georges Salles.

== Points of view ==
A few weeks later [in 1951], in Paris, I went to see Georges Salles, director of French Museums, a charming gentleman with whom I had formed a warm but casual friendship, having been introduced by Picasso. I was touched by the fact that in his office at the Louvre hung but a single work of art: a small etching of a girl's head by Cezanne, executed in 1873 under the tutelage of Dr. Gachet at Auvers-sur-Oise. I related my visit to Cezanne's studio and asked whether the French Museums might not eventually intervene to save for posterity this unique locale where so intense an evocation of Cezanne's spirit still survived. He replied that the prospect was highly appealing to him personally, but that he would have little hope of persuading superior authorities to subsidize it. Still, he promised to make inquiries at Aix-en-Provence and advise me of the situation there as concerned possible preservation of the studio. Some months passed before he invited me to tea in his beautiful apartment in the Louvre and told me that the studio was for sale for a sum then approximately between 25 and 30 thousand American dollars. At the time this was an appreciable amount but for what was at stake, it seemed to me almost trifling—a bargain in cultural value. Wouldn't it be possible, I suggested, to raise such an amount by appealing to French philanthropists and owners of works by Cezanne? Monsieur Salles suavely smiled in an expression of ironic skepticism. His compatriots, he said with a sigh, were rarely inclined to part with money for charitable purposes that would bring them but slight public prestige. He suggested that I try to raise money for preservation of the studio in America, where funds for such purposes were much more generously forthcoming. Meanwhile, he would keep an eye on happenings in Aix-en-Provence and try to prevent the studio's sale until, if possible, the purchase funds could be raised in America. For my part, I promised to do all I could to achieve that goal, though the promise must have seemed pretentious, to say the least, coming from a foreigner aged only 29

— James Lord, Art in America

By inscribing the polis in the kosmos, we could also exemplify the preceding with this sentence from Georges Salles: 'An art differs from the one that precedes it and realizes itself because it sets forth a reality of a nature different from a simple plastic modification: it reflects another man... The moment one must seize is the one in which a plastic plenitude responds to the birth of a social type.

— Jean-Luc Nancy, The Muses, Stanford University Press, 1996, p. 85. Salles' sentence was previously cited by Jean-Louis Déotte in Le Musée, origine de l'esthétique, L'Harmattan, Paris, 1993, p. 17

== Bibliography ==
- Histoire des Arts de l’Orient
- Au Louvre, scènes de la vie du musée
- Introduction de l'ouvrage Arts de la Chine ancienne (1937)
- Le Regard (1939)
- La Tapisserie française du Moyen Âge à nos jours (Catalogue, 1946)
- Julio Gonzales. Dessins et aquarelles. Couverture lithographique de Mourlot. (Éditions Berggruen, 1957)
- Numerous and various contributions in l'Illustration, le Figaro, L'Œil (including No. 47 of 15 November 1958), etc.

Cultural offices
Preceded by Chauncey Hamlin	President of the International Council of Museums; 1953–1959	Succeeded by Philip Hendy
