= Arthur van Schendel =

Dutch writer

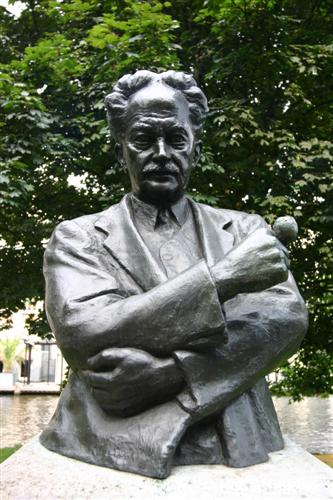
Arthur van Schendel

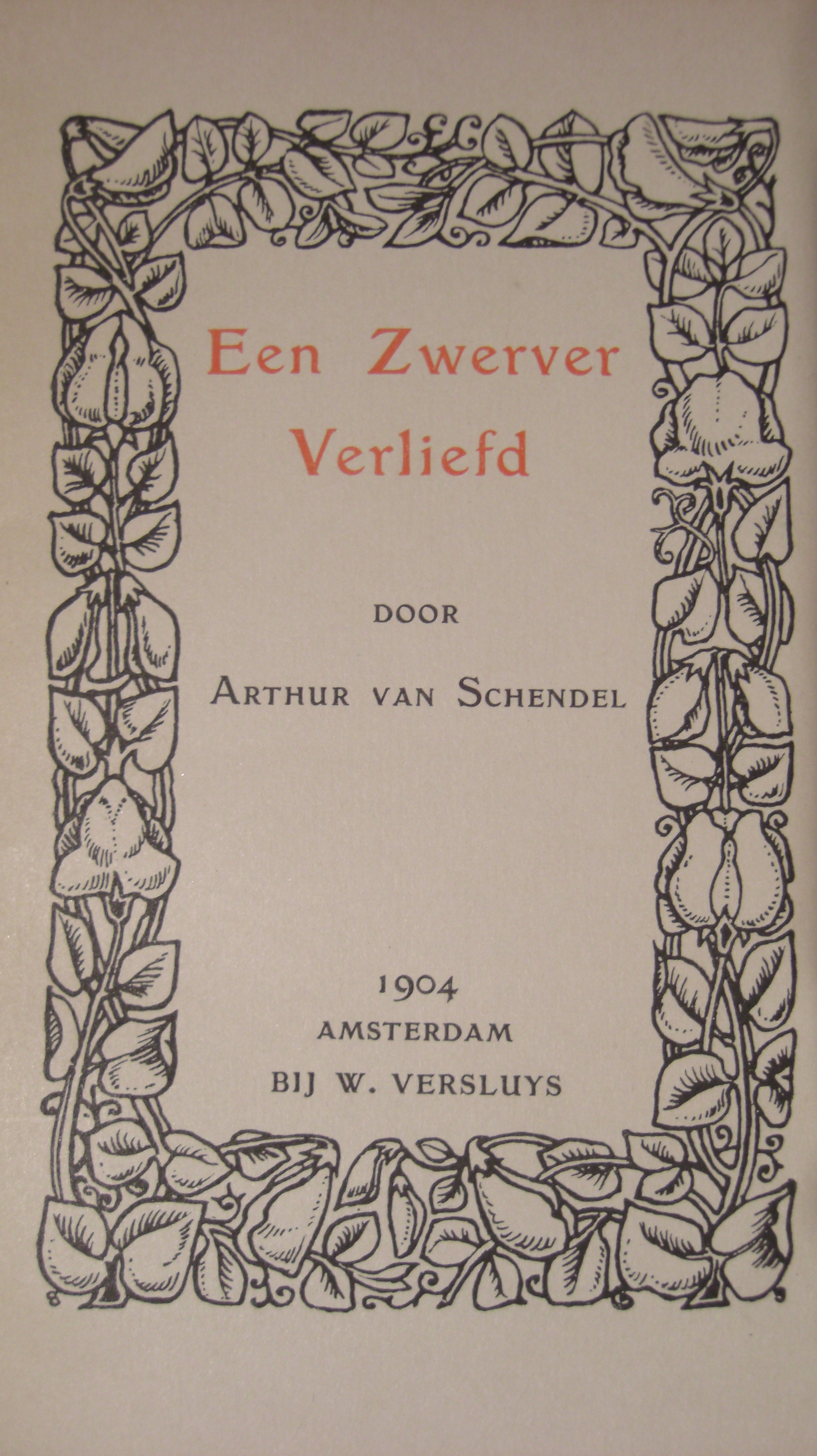
Title page of Een zwerver verliefd

Arthur van Schendel (15 March 1874 in Batavia, Dutch East Indies – 11 September 1946 in Amsterdam) was a Dutch writer of novels and short stories. One of his best known works is Het fregatschip Johanna Maria. His son Arthur F.E. van Schendel (1910–1979) was General Director of the Rijksmuseum Amsterdam from 1959–1975.

== Prizes ==
- 1931 – C.W. van der Hoogtprijs for Het fregatschip Johanna Maria
- 1933 – Tollensprijs for his entire oeuvre
- 1947 – P.C. Hooftprijs for Het oude huis

== Bibliography ==
- 1896 – Drogon
- 1904 – Een zwerver verliefd (A Wanderer in Love)
- 1907 – Een zwerver verdwaald (A Lost Wanderer)
- 1908 – De schoone jacht (The beautiful hunt)
- 1910 – Shakespeare
- 1913 – De berg van droomen (The mountain of dreams)
- 1916 – De mensch van Nazareth (The human of Nazareth)
- 1919 – Pandorra
- 1920 – Tristan en Isolde
- 1921 – Der liefde bloesems (About the love of blossoms)
- 1922 – Rose Angélique, de droomers van de liefde (Rose Angélique, the dreamers of love)
- 1923 – Angiolio en de lente (Angiolio and spring)
- 1923 – Blanke gestalten (White shapes)
- 1924 – Oude Italiaansche steden (Old Italian cities)
- 1925 – Verdichtsel van zomerdagen (Poetry of summer days)
- 1926 – Verlaine
- 1927 – Maneschijn (Moonlight)
- 1927 – Merona, een edelman (Merona, a nobleman)
- 1928 – Fratilamur
- 1929 – Florentijnsche verhalen (Florentinian stories)
- 1930 – Het fregatschip Johanna Maria (roman) (The frigate Johanna Maria)
- 1931 – Een eiland in de Zuidzee (An island in the South Sea)
- 1932 – Jan Compagnie (John Company)
- 1933 – De waterman (The waterman)
- 1934 – Herinneringen van een dommen jongen (Memories of a silly boy)
- 1935 – Een Hollandsch drama (A Dutch drama)
- 1936 – De rijke man (The rich man)
- 1937 – De grauwe vogels (The ashen birds)
- 1938 – De wereld een dansfeest (The world a ball)
- 1938 – Nachtgedaanten (Nightshapes)
- 1939 – Anders en eender (Different and equal)
- 1939 – De zeven tuinen (roman) (The seven gardens)
- 1940 – Mijnheer Oberon en Mevrouw (Mister Oberon and Miss)
- 1941 – De menschenhater (roman) (The men hater)
- 1942 – Een spel der natuur (A game of nature)
- 1942 – De wedergeboorte van Bedelman (collection) (The rebirth of Bedelman)
- 1946 – De Nederlanden (poem) (The Netherlands)
- 1946 – Het oude huis (roman) (The old house)
- 1948 – Voorbijgaande schaduwen (Passing shadows)
- 1976 – Verzameld werk (1976–1978, 1983) (Collected work)
