= International Council of Museums =

Organization of museums and museum professionals founded in 1946

- Abbreviation: ICOM
- Formation: 1946; 80 years ago
- Type: Non-governmental organization
- Purpose: Conservation, continuation and communication to society of the world's natural and cultural heritage
- Location: Paris, France
- Coordinates: 48°50′44″N 2°18′23″E
- Website: icom.museum

The International Council of Museums (ICOM) is a non-governmental organisation dedicated to museums, maintaining formal relations with UNESCO and having a consultative status with the United Nations Economic and Social Council. Founded in 1946, ICOM also partners with entities such as the World Intellectual Property Organization, Interpol, and the World Customs Organization in order to carry out its international public service missions, which include fighting illicit traffic in cultural goods and promoting risk management and emergency preparedness to protect world cultural heritage in the event of natural or man-made disasters. ICOM members receive a card providing free or reduced-rate entry to many museums worldwide.

== History ==
ICOM traces it roots back to the defunct International Museums Office (OIM (Office international des musées)), created in 1926 by the League of Nations. An agency of the League's International Commission on Intellectual Cooperation, like many of the League's initiatives the OIM was dissolved following WWII, and its activities later assumed by ICOM.

== ICOM Code of Ethics for Museums ==
ICOM adopted its ICOM Code of Ethics for Museums in 1986, a reference tool that sets standards of excellence to which all members of the organisation must adhere. The ICOM Code of Ethics for Museums, translated into 39 languages and revised in 2004, establishes values and principles shared by ICOM and the international museum community. These standards of self-regulation by museums include basic principles for museum governance, the acquisition and disposal of collections, and rules for professional conduct.

A decision was reached in 2019 following the 25th General Conference of ICOM that the Code should be reviewed and revised if necessary. The review process is ongoing and is coordinated by the ICOM Standing Committee for Ethics (ETHCOM), a dedicated ICOM body which handles ethical issues relating to museums.

== Red Lists ==
Since 2000, ICOM has published its Red Lists to combat the illicit traffic in cultural goods which causes significant damage to heritage, particularly in regions of the world where cultural property is most susceptible to theft and looting. Supporting the fight against illicit traffic in cultural goods is among ICOM's highest priorities, and the Red Lists raise awareness on smuggling and illicit trade in cultural objects. The ICOM Red Lists are tools designed to help police and customs officials, heritage professionals, and art and antiquities dealers to identify the types of objects that are most susceptible to illicit trafficking.

As of 2025, ICOM has published Red Lists for many different countries and regions:

- Afghanistan
- Africa
- Brazil
- Cambodia
- Central America and Mexico
- China
- Colombia
- Dominican Republic
- Egypt
- Greece
- Haiti
- Iraq (and 2015 update)
- Latin America
- Libya
- Mali and West Africa
- Peru
- Southeast Europe
- Syria
- Ukraine
- Yemen

Red Lists are not lists of stolen objects, but are awareness-raising tools to identify categories of cultural objects subject to theft and traffic. They help individuals, organisations and authorities, such as police or customs officials, identify objects at risk and prevent them from being illegally sold or exported. The cultural goods depicted on the lists are inventoried objects within the collections of recognised institutions. They serve to illustrate the categories of cultural goods most vulnerable to illicit traffic.

ICOM publishes the Red Lists with the scientific collaboration of national and international experts and the support of dedicated sponsors, to cover the most vulnerable areas of the world in terms of illicit trafficking of cultural objects. The lists are published in different languages according to the context of each list. Among other successes, these tools have contributed to the identification, recovery and restitution of thousands of cultural objects from Iraq, Afghanistan and Mali.

== Museums emergency programme ==
ICOM is committed to providing cultural institutions with the necessary support and risk prevention tools when faced with conflict situations or natural disasters. Through its Disaster Relief for Museums Task Force (DRTF), its Museums Emergency Programme (MEP) and its active role in the Blue Shield, ICOM assists museums worldwide by mobilising its resources quickly and efficiently to provide support in both the prevention and the aftermath of disaster situations.

The Getty Conservation Institute and ICCROM (International Centre for the Study of the Preservation and Restoration of Cultural Property) took part in this programme and helped develop training tools for MEP. ICOM's action programme offers a long-term global response that strengthens the Blue Shield dynamism.

== International Museum Day ==
Every year since 1977, ICOM has organised International Museum Day, a worldwide event held around 18 May. From America and Oceania to Europe, Asia and Africa, International Museum Day aims to increase public awareness of the role of museums in developing society.

== Committees ==
ICOM operates 35 international committees on a range of museum specialties, who conduct advanced research in their respective fields for the benefit of the museum community.

- AFRICOM – International Council of African Museums
- AVICOM – Audio-visual & New Technologies and Social Media
- CAMOC – Museums of Cities
- CECA – Education & Cultural Action
- CIDOC – Documentation
- CIMCIM – Museums and Collections of Instruments and Music
- CIMUSET – Science & Technology
- COMCOL – Collecting
- COSTUME – International Committee for Museums and Collections of Costume
- DEMHIST – Historic House Museums
- GLASS
- ICAMT- Architecture & Museum Techniques
- ICDAD – Decorative Arts and Design
- ICEE – Exhibition Exchange
- ICFA – Fine Arts
- ICLM – Literary Museums
- ICMAH – Archaeology & History
- ICME – Ethnography
- ICMEMO – Memorial Museums
- ICMS – Museum Security
- ICR – Regional Museums
- ICOFOM – Museology
- ICOMAM – Arms & Military History
- ICOM-CC – Conservation
- ICOMON – Money & Banking Museums
- ICTOP – Training of Personnel
- INTERCOM – Management
- NATHIST – Natural History
- ICOM MPR (International Committee for Marketing and Public Relation): this committee was founded in 1977 by Jan Jelínek, and provides training for museum professionals in marketing and communications, through annual conferences and a regular online newsletter. The most recent conference was held in Armenia in 2015, with the theme of "Emerging Trends". Previous conferences have been held in Taiwan, Rio de Janeiro, Palermo, Brno, Shanghai, Moscow and Yasnaya Polyana, and Paraty and Rio de Janeiro. The MPR board consists of marketing and communication museum professionals from several countries. Each member is elected for a 3-year term at ICOM General Conferences.
- UMAC – University Museums

ICOM also comprises 120 national committees that ensure that the interests of the organisation are managed in their respective countries. The national committees represent their members within ICOM and they contribute to the implementation of the organisation's programmes.

== General Conference ==
The ICOM General Conference is held every three years and gathers museum professionals from several countries. The first meeting was held in Paris in 1948. In recent years, General Conferences have been held in Seoul in 2004 (the first meeting in Asia), in Vienna in 2007, and in Shanghai in 2010. This 22nd General Conference in Shanghai followed the World Expo where the ICOM's Pavilion was inaugurated and named "Museums, Heart of the City". The General Conference was held in Rio de Janeiro in 2013, in Milan in 2016, in Kyoto in 2019, in Prague in 2022, in Dubai in 2025. Rotterdam is to welcome the 28th ICOM General Conference dedicated to Building Bridges. Connecting Worlds, Cultures, and Generations in 2028.

== Governance ==
The current ICOM President is Antonio Rodríguez. He succeeded Emma Nardi, Alberto Garlandini. The current Director General is Medea Ekner, who succeeded Peter Keller. Previous Directors General were Anne-Catherine Robert-Hauglustaine (2014–2016) and Hanna Pennock (2013–2014).

=== Presidents ===
No.	Period	Name	Country
1	1946–1953	Chauncey Hamlin	United States
2	1953–1959	Georges Salles	France
3	1959–1965	Philip Hendy	United Kingdom
4	1965–1971	Arthur van Schendel	Netherlands
5	1971–1977	Jan Jelínek	Czechoslovakia
6	1977–1983	Hubert Landais	France
7	1983–1989	Geoffrey Lewis	United Kingdom
8	1989–1992	Alpha Oumar Konaré	Mali
9	1992–1998	Saroj Ghose	India
10	1998–2004	Jacques Perot	France
11	2004–2010	Alissandra Cummins	Barbados
12	2010–2016	Hans-Martin Hinz	Germany
13	2016–2020	Suay Aksoy	Turkey
14	2020–2022	Alberto Garlandini	Italy
15	2022–2025	Emma Nardi	Italy
16	2025–	Antonio Rodríguez	United States

== CIDOC conceptual reference model ==
CIDOC, ICOM's International Committee for Documentation, provides the museum community with standards and advice on museum documentation.

The CIDOC Conceptual Reference Model (CRM), formalised as the official international standard ISO 21127, is used to map cultural heritage information to a common and extensible semantic framework. This "semantic glue" can be used to connect between different sources of cultural heritage information published by museums, libraries and archives.

The committee was founded by Ivan Illich in 1961 in Cuernavaca, Mexico.

== Online museums ==
ICOM was the first international organisation to participate in the Virtual Library museums pages (VLmp) online museums directory in the 1990s. It was also instrumental in the creation of the ".museum" top-level domain (TLD) for museums online through the Museum Domain Management Association (MuseDoma).

== Affiliated Organisations ==
Affiliated Organisations of the International Council of Museums (ICOM) are crucial entities that operate in alignment with ICOM's mission, contributing to the diversity and richness of the global museum network. These organisations, recognized and supported by ICOM, often focus on specific themes, disciplines, or regions within the museum sector. Together with ICOM, these Affiliated Organisations collectively strengthen the global museum community, ensuring a comprehensive and interconnected approach to the diverse facets of museum work.

== See also ==
- Museum of Engines and Mechanisms
