= Châteauneuf-sur-Loire =

- Commune
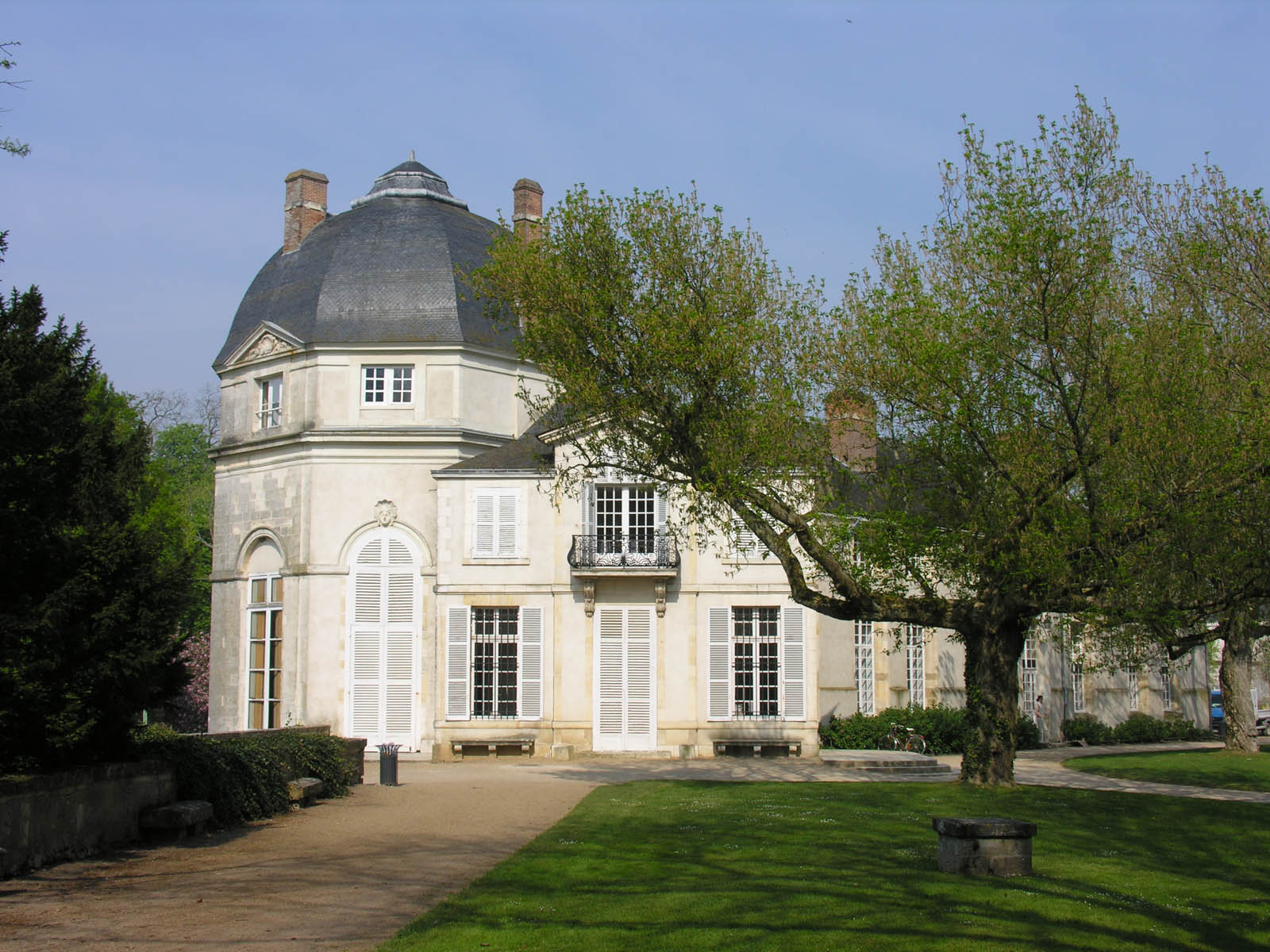
- The château, which contains the town hall

- Coat of arms
- Location of Châteauneuf-sur-Loire
- Location within France Location within Centre-Val de Loire
- Coordinates: 47°51′58″N 2°13′23″E
- Country: France
- Region: Centre-Val de Loire
- Department: Loiret
- Arrondissement: Orléans
- Canton: Châteauneuf-sur-Loire

Government
  - Mayor (2020–2026): Florence Galzin
- Area^{1}: 40.01 km^{2} (15.45 sq mi)
- Highest elevation: 131 m (430 ft)
- Lowest elevation: 100 m (330 ft)
- Population (2023): 8,546
  - Density: 213.6/km^{2} (553.2/sq mi)
- Demonym: Castelneuviens
- Time zone: UTC+01:00 (CET)
  - Summer (DST): UTC+02:00 (CEST)
- INSEE/Postal code: 45082 /45110
- Website: www.chateauneuf-sur-loire.com
- ^{1} French Land Register data, which excludes lakes, ponds, glaciers > 1 km^{2} (0.386 sq mi or 247 acres) and river estuaries.

Châteauneuf-sur-Loire (French pronunciation: [ʃɑtonœf syʁ lwaʁ]) is a commune in the Loiret department in north-central France.

== Population ==
Historical population
| Year | Pop. | ±% p.a. |
|---|---|---|
| 1968 | 4,850 | — |
| 1975 | 5,528 | +1.89% |
| 1982 | 5,998 | +1.17% |
| 1990 | 6,558 | +1.12% |
| 1999 | 7,032 | +0.78% |
| 2007 | 7,801 | +1.31% |
| 2012 | 7,926 | +0.32% |
| 2017 | 8,126 | +0.50% |
| 2023 | 8,546 | +0.84% |
Source: INSEE

== Twin towns ==
- Amarante, Portugal
- Bad Laasphe, Germany

== See also ==
- Communes of the Loiret department
