= National Touring Exhibitions =

UK art programme

National Touring Exhibitions is a programme managed and funded by Arts Council England that aims to provide access to high-quality contemporary and historical travelling exhibitions throughout the UK. The programme organises two to three major art exhibitions a year and has a further dozen that require minimal technical support. It is also responsible for the British Art Show.

It is a direct descendant of the original Council for the Encouragement of Music and the Arts (CEMA) programme.
