= Arthur F.E. van Schendel =

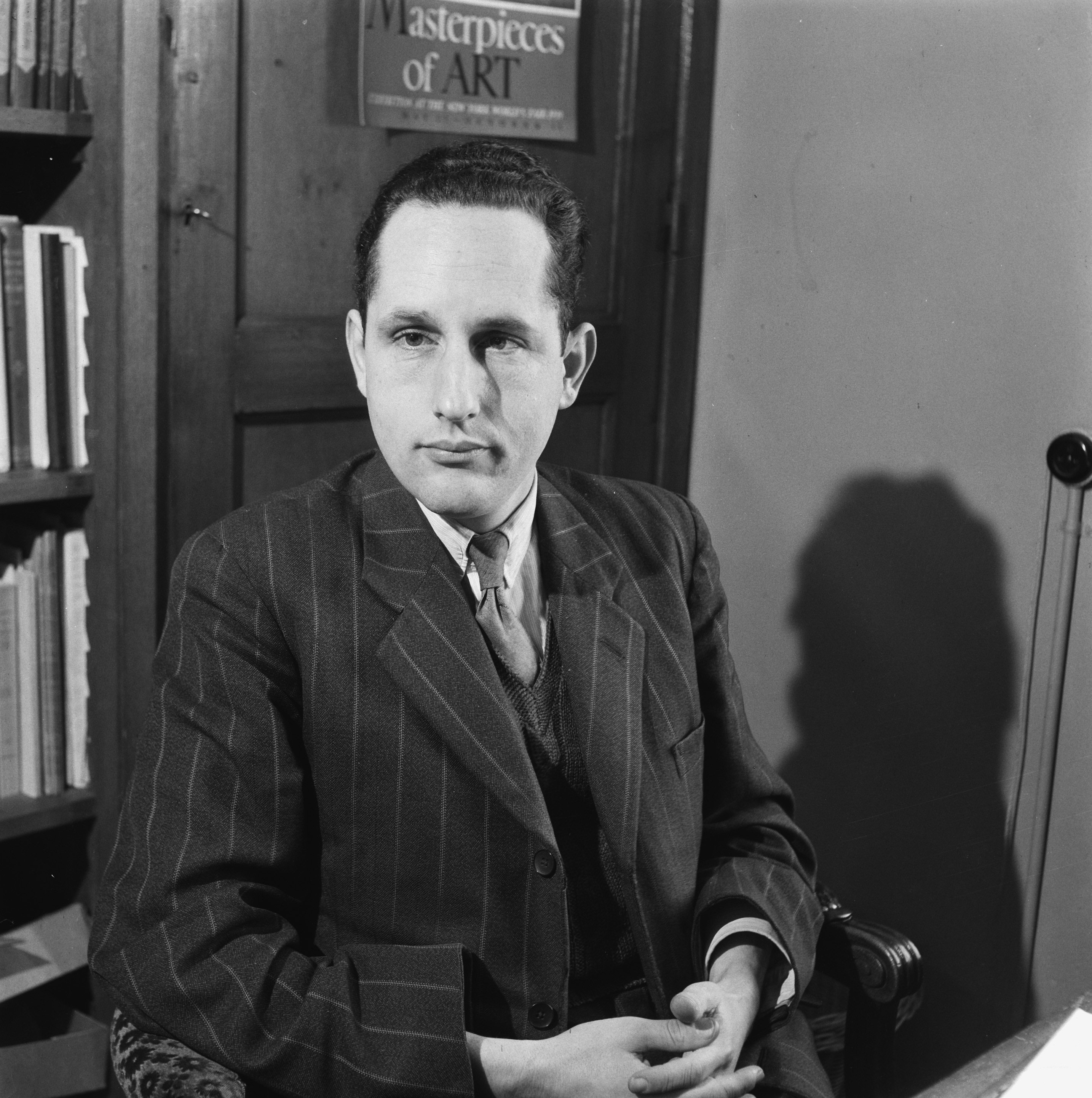
Arthur van Schendel (1945)

Arthur François Emile van Schendel (18 May 1910, in Ede – 6 February 1979, in Amsterdam) was a Dutch art historian and museum director. From 1959 to 1975 he was General Director of the Rijksmuseum Amsterdam. He also served two terms as President of the International Council of Museums (ICOM) from 1965 to 1971. His father Arthur van Schendel was a Dutch writer of novels and short stories.

== Publications ==
- Le dessin en Lombardie jusqu'à la fin du XVe siècle [fr], Brussel, 1938 & Amsterdam, Breitner, 1939.
- De restauraties van Rembrandt's Nachtwacht [nl], in: Old Holland, 1947.
- De schimmen van De Staalmeesters [nl], in: Old Holland, 1956.

== Bibliography ==
- Vries, de, A.B., Arthur van Schendel (1910–1979), in: The Burlington Magazine, 1979.
- Thiel, van P.J.J., All the Paintings of the Rijksmuseum in Amsterdam: a completely illustrated catalogue, Department of Paintings of the Rijksmuseum, Maarssen, G. Schwartz, 1976.

Cultural offices
Preceded by Philip Hendy	President of the International Council of Museums; 1965–1971	Succeeded by Jan Jelínek
