= Jean Charbonneaux =

French archaeologist (1895–1969)

- Born: 15 January 1895; Genlis (Côte-d'Or), France
- Died: 21 February 1969 (aged 74); Paris, France
- Occupation: Archaeologist

Jean Marie Augustin Charbonneaux (15 January 1895 – 21 February 1969) was a French archaeologist.

He was a member of the French School at Athens from 1921 to 1925 and of the Académie des inscriptions et belles-lettres from 1962. He was successively curator, chief curator, Inspector General of the Museums of France, and professor of Greek and Roman archeology at the École du Louvre from 1930 to 1965.

== Publications (selection) ==
- 1925: with K. Gottlob: La Tholos, 2: Relevés et restaurations. In: Fouilles de Delphes, 2. Topographie et architecture. E. de Boccard, Paris.
- 1929: L'art égéen. G. van Oest, Paris and Brussels
- 1936: Les terres cuites grecques. L. Reynaud, Paris.
- 1939: La sculpture grecque archaïque. Éditions de Cluny, Paris;
- 1912–1945: La sculpture grecque classique. La Guilde du livre, Lausanne;
- 1948: L'art au siècle d'Auguste. Guilde du Livre, Lausanne.
- 1949: Les sculptures de Rodin. F. Hazan, Paris.
- 1958: Les bronzes grecs. Presses Universitaires de France, Paris.
- 1968: with Roland Martin and François Villard: Grèce archaïque (620–480 avant J.-C.). Gallimard, (Univers des formes. volume 14).
- 1969: with Roland Martin and François Villard: Grèce classique (480–330 avant J.-C.). Gallimard, (Univers des formes, volume 16).
- 1970: with Roland Martin and François Villard: Grèce hellénistique (330–50 avant J.-C.). Gallimard, Paris 1970 (Univers des formes, volume 18.
- 1970: with Pierre Pradel: Architecture et sculpture des origines à nos jours. 4 volumes. Fernand Nathan, Paris.

== Bibliography ==
- P. Devambez: Jean Charbonneaux (1895–1969). In: Revue Archeologique. 1969, (p. 119–120).
- G. Cart in: La Revue du Louvre et des Musees de France. Band 19, Heft 2, 1969, (p. 76–78).
- Pierre Demargne: Notice sur la vie et les travaux de M. Jean Charbonneaux, membre de l'Académie. In: Comptes-rendus des séances de l'Académie des inscriptions et belles-lettres, volume 114, 1970, (p. 116–126) (online).
