= Henri Joseph Hogard =

French surveyor (1776-1837)

Henri Joseph Hogard (14 May 1776 - 3 September 1837) was a French forest surveyor, geometer, and draughtsman.

== Life ==
He was born in Charmes, Vosges to François Henri Hogard, a bailiff at the bailiwick, and Catherine Marcot. He married Béatrix Anne Charlotte Colin (1780–1837), whose nephew was Charles Pensée. Hogard taught Pensée drawing, maths and geometry. In 1792 he volunteered for the army and he was also embodied again when he reached the conscription age. He was then made secretary-draughtsman then engineer-geographer to Dominique René Vandamme.

Returning to his family he became a geometer and forest surveyor in Épinal, where he became a member of the municipal council and of the "La Parfaite Union" masonic lodge (becoming its venerable from 1819 to 1827). He and his son Henri-Charles wrote a Manuel supplémentaire d'arpentage in 1836 and in 1822 invented the 'limbomètre', a device that graphically solves all problems depending on right-angled triangles, made by Esteveny in Paris. Christophe Doublat, owner of the park at the château d’Épinal, summoned Henri Joseph Hogard to develop his estate and create a 'jardin à l'anglaise'.

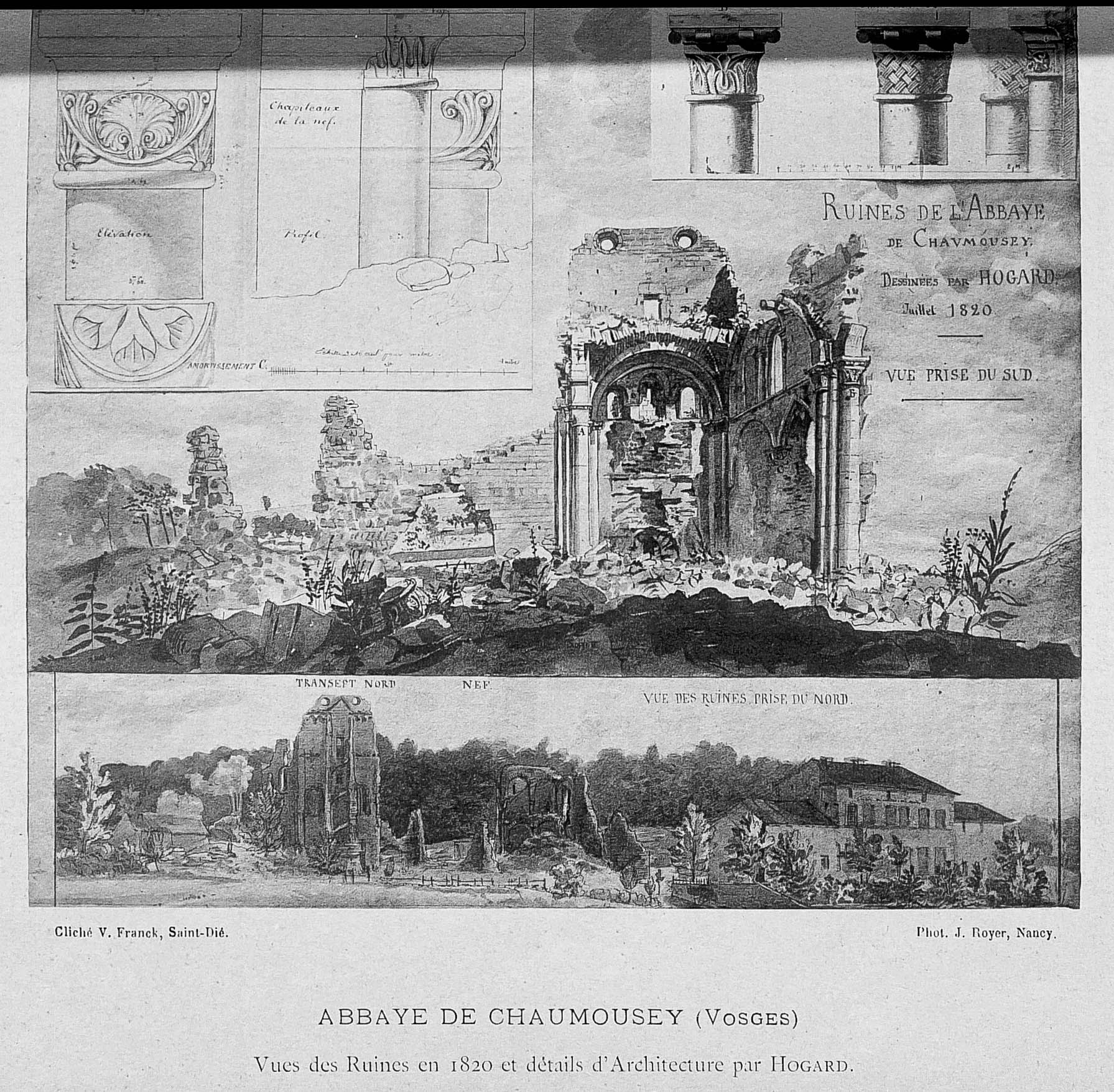
Ruins of the abbaye de Chaumousey in 1820.

In 1820, he became a member of Vosges's departmental Commission des antiquités, which in 1825 became the Société d'émulation du département des Vosges. Thanks to his talents as a draughtsman, Henri Joseph Hogard produced plans and drawings of many ancient monuments in the department, some of which have since vanished. He also created drawings and plans of the ruins of the abbey at Chaumousey. This work drew praise from the Minister of the Interior.

The following year he visited the church at Champ-le-Duc, making detailed sketches of it. He later drew a Gallo-Roman tomb exhumed at Damas-aux-Bois by his colleague Parisot. On 8 October 1823 the Commission des antiquités ordered him to negotiate with Colombier, mayor of Autrey and owner of a wire drawer installed in the church of the former abbey near the village, with the aim of recovering the 16th century stained glass windows of that monument and placing them in the museum at Épinal. Hogard died in Épinal and a street there is named after him.

== Works ==
- Département des Vosges. Carte d'une portion de l'Arrondissement de Mirecourt sur laquelle se trouvent des Vestiges d'une route Romaine AB-KL, selon qu'il est détaillé dans le rapport fait le 27 juin 1821 à la Commission de la recherche des Antiquités du Département des Vosges par le soussigné géomètre à Epinal et membre de cette Commission. Echelle dans le rapport de 1 à 50. 000, Signée Hogard. Pr. copie conforme, le secrétaire de la Commission, Parisot. Épinal, 1821. Online version
- Plans of four of M. le Baron Falatieu's factories, situated in the towns of Bains and Fontenoy-le-Château, 1829. Documents attached to the owner's request for the maintenance of his factories. Archives Nationales F/14/4499
- Two sepia-wash drawings (1828) and two plans of the château d’Épinal (1834), in Album of drawings of the park of the château d’Épinal, now held at the bibliothèque multimédia intercommunale d’Épinal. Online version
- Manuel supplémentaire d'arpentage... par MM. Hogard,... et Henri Hogard,..., Paris, Roret, 1836

== Bibliography ==
- (in French) Georges Poull, « Henri-Joseph Hogard », in Albert Ronsin (dir.), Les Vosgiens célèbres. Dictionnaire biographique illustré, Éditions Gérard Louis, Vagney, 1990, p. 189 ISBN 2-907016-09-1
