= Charles Pensée =

French painter and illustrator (1799–1871)

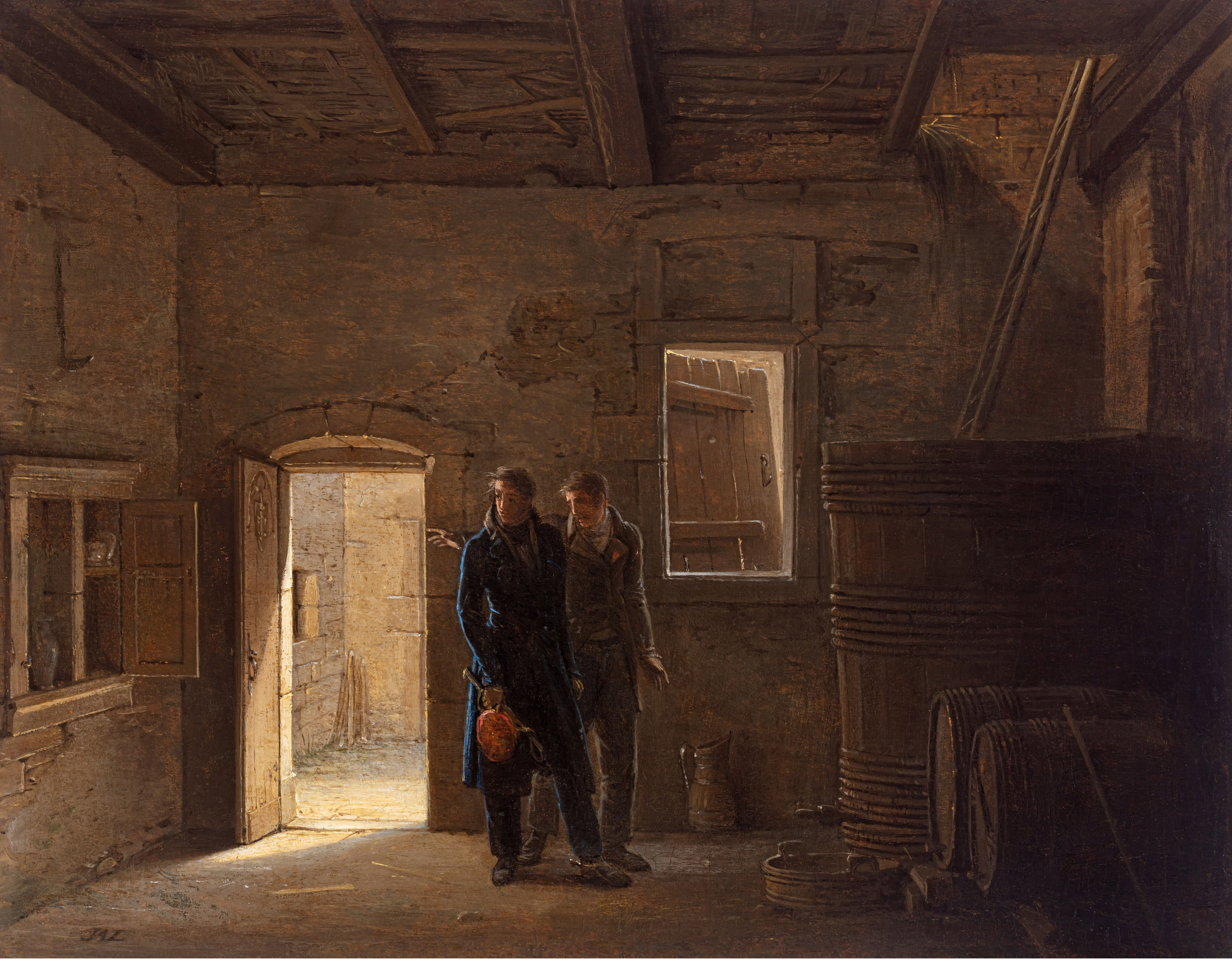
Joan of Arc's birthplace before its restoration by Jean-Antoine Laurent, showing Jollois and Pensée, 1819.

Charles François Joseph Pensée (11 August 1799 - 11 July 1871) was a French painter and illustrator. A street in Épinal is named after him.

== Life ==
He was born in Épinal to Jean-François Pensée, deputy head of the administration of the department of Vosges, and Marie-Magdelaine Collin and had two sisters, Thérèse-Amélie and Sophie. Their father died while serving as a huissier when Charles was aged fourteen and he was raised by his mother. He abandoned his studies and initially worked for his uncle Henri Joseph Hogard, a geometrical surveyor, who gave him his first training in drawing, then for Monsieur Goury, the Corps des ponts et chaussées' chief engineer for Vosges department. ·

When Goury resigned, Pensée started collaborated with the French chief engineer Jean-Baptiste Prosper Jollois and took part in the collecting Jollois carried out for the Antiquités remarquables du département des Vosges He contributed several illustrations of the Grand archaeological site.

When Jollois changed jobs in 1822 Pensée followed him to Orléans. Wishing to work as a drawing tutor there, he went to Paris to train in Monsieur Hubert's studio, notably in watercolour. On returning to Orléans he taught drawing in public establishments and as a private tutor. At the lycée, during the 1864–1865 school year, one of his pupils was Paul Gauguin, as shown by Swiss chalet beside the Loire, a drawing sold at auction on 16 June 2019 at the château d'Artigny. Pensée died at Orléans and his funeral occurred there on 13 July 1871. He is buried in the grand cimetière d'Orléans.

== Works ==
Several of his drawings show the banks of the river Loire and Lorraine. He particularly portrayed architectural views. The musée de la Marine de Loire in Châteauneuf-sur-Loire (Loiret) has many prints by him, as does the musée Crozatier. The bibliothèque multimédia intercommunale d'Épinal has a collection of his drawings showing the park at the château d'Épinal, owned by Monsieur Doublat.

Charles Pensée notably portrayed monuments or landscapes in:

- Bou (Loiret) : church in Bou, showing effects of the Loire's 1866 flood ;
- Blessing of the dragon's grotto at La Chapelle-Saint-Mesmin (Loiret) by Félix Dupanloup, bishop of Orléans, in 1858 ;
- Châteaudun (Eure-et-Loir) : musée des Beaux-Arts et d'Histoire Naturelle, Château de Châteaudun, Dunois wing, charcoal, 58,8 x 44,8 cm;
- Châteauneuf-sur-Loire (Loiret) ;
- Cusset (Allier) : church of Saint-Saturnin ;
- La Ferté-Saint-Aubin (Loiret) : château de la Grisonnière et de Chartraine ;
- The old pont d'Olivet, c. 1842, oil on canvas, 49 x 64,5 cm, musée des Beaux-Arts d'Orléans;
- Grand (Vosges), Grand archaeological site ;
- Jargeau (Loiret) : effects of the 1856 Loire flood ;
- Le Malesherbois (Loiret) : château de Rouville, Malesherbes ;
- Mennetou-sur-Cher ;
- Méréville (Seine-et-Oise) ;
- Rère (Loir-et-Cher) ;
- Sandillon (Loiret) : Allou, La Porte estate ;
- Sully-la-Chapelle (Loiret) : château de Claireau ;
- Vichy (Allier) ;
- Vienne-en-Val (Loiret) : Les Prateaux estate ;
- Villeneuve-l'Étang (Seine-et-Oise) ;
- Stonemasons at Saint-Euverte church, 1826, watercolour on pencil on vellum, 32,8 x 24,9 cm, musée des Beaux-Arts d’Orléans;
- View of place du grand marché, 1830, watercolour, highlighted in white gouache and vegetable gum on black crayon, on vellum, 43,8 x 56,4 cm, musée des Beaux-Arts d’Orléans;
- View of the old hôtel-Dieu, 1842, watercolour, with white gouache highlights on pencil, on vellum, 40,8 x 56,3 cm, musée des Beaux-Arts d’Orléans.
Works by Charles Pensée

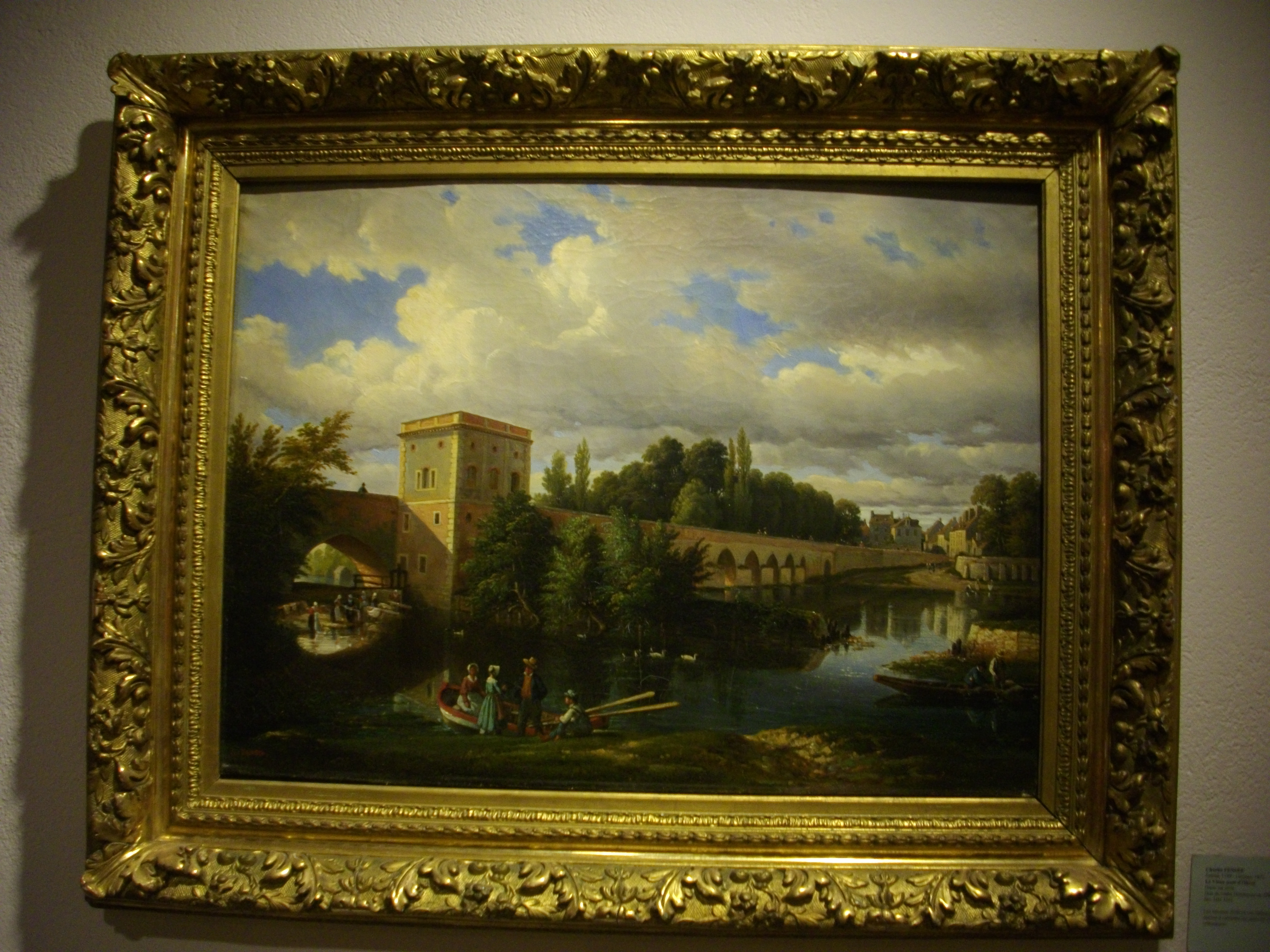
The old pont d'Olivet, Orléans, musée historique et archéologique de l'Orléanais.

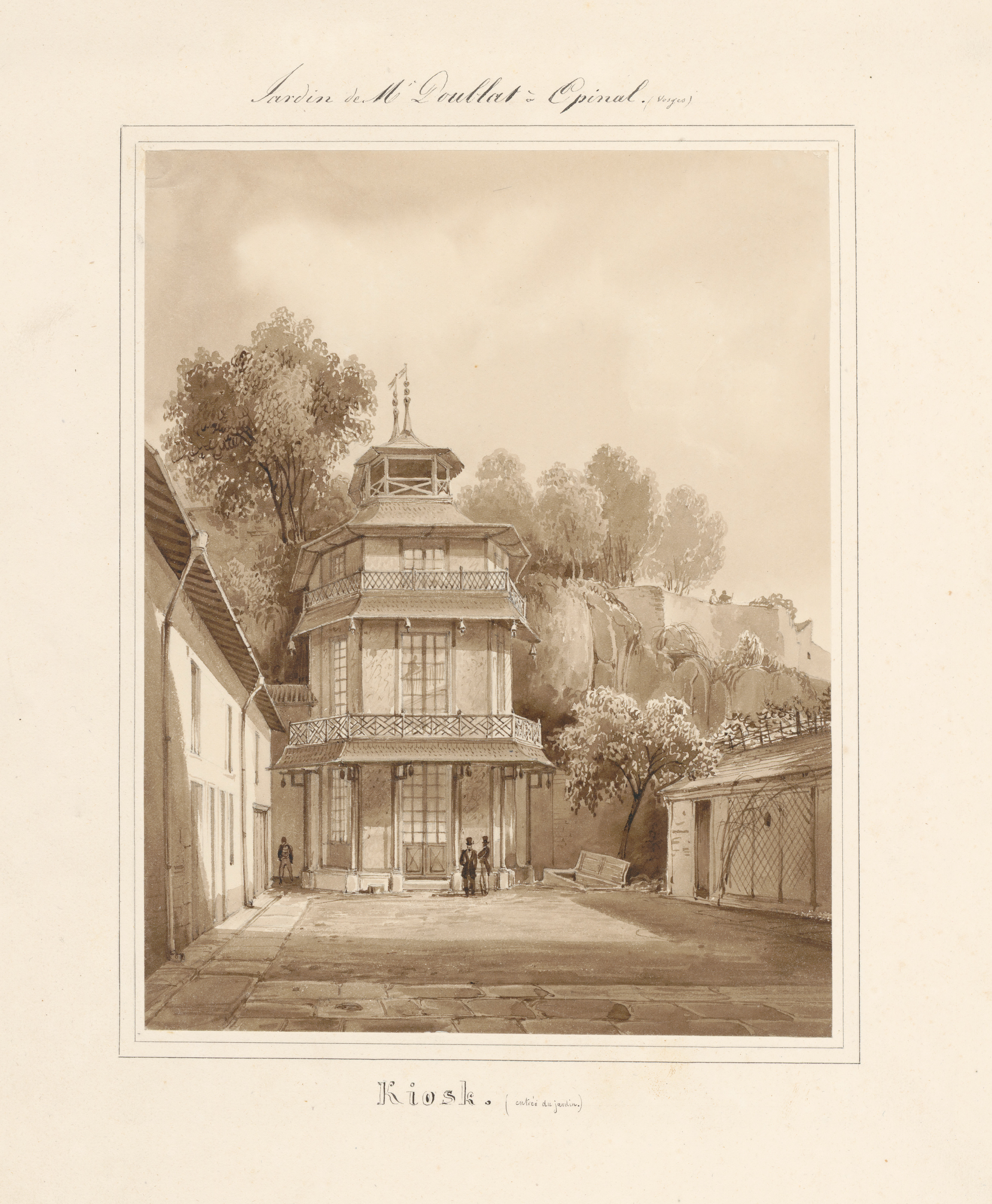
M. Doublat's garden in Épinal. Kiosk, wash of a scene at the château d'Épinal, bibliothèque multimédia intercommunale d'Épinal.

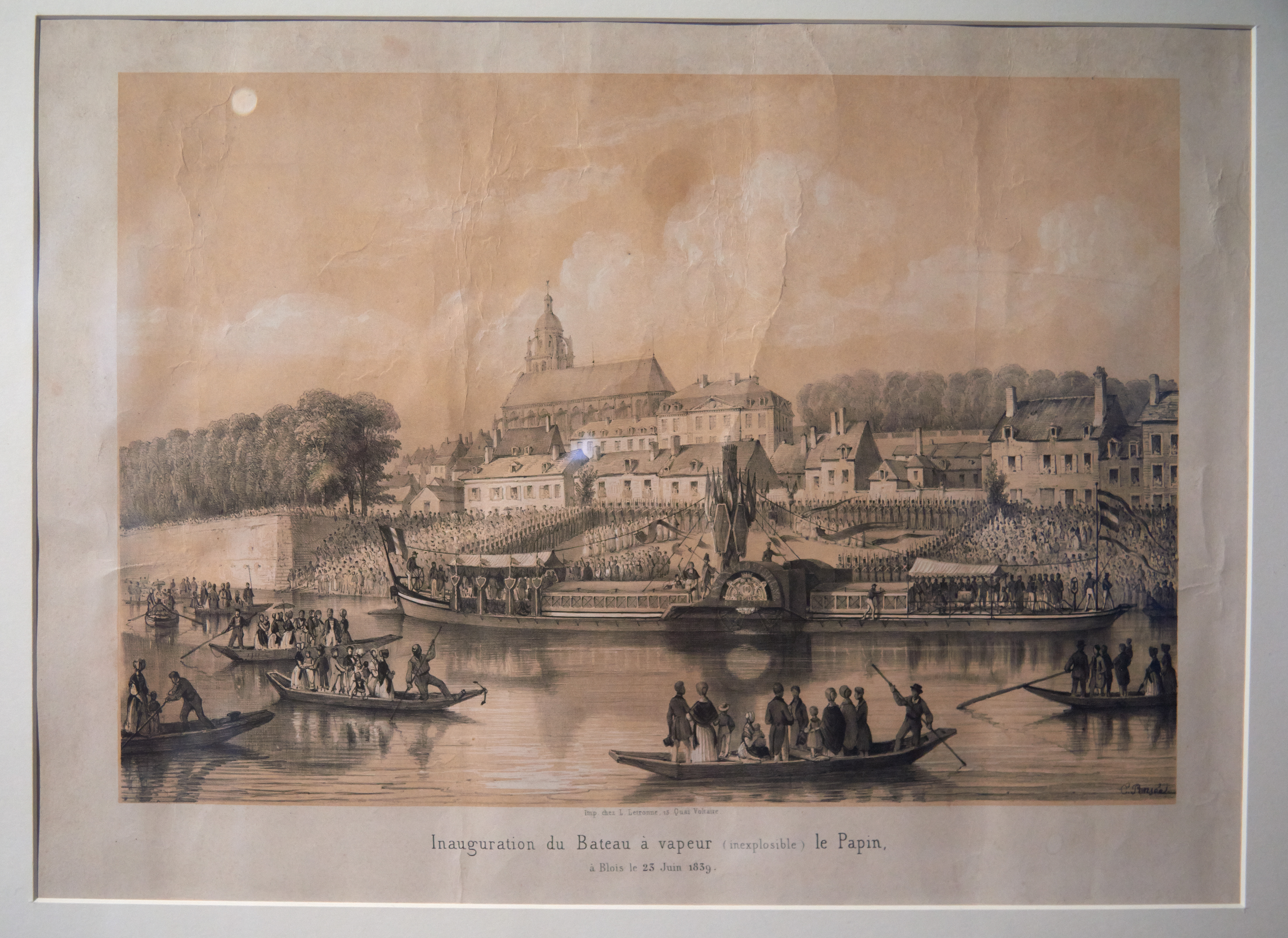
Inauguration of the “Le Papin” steam packet, Châteauneuf-sur-Loire, musée de la Marine de Loire.

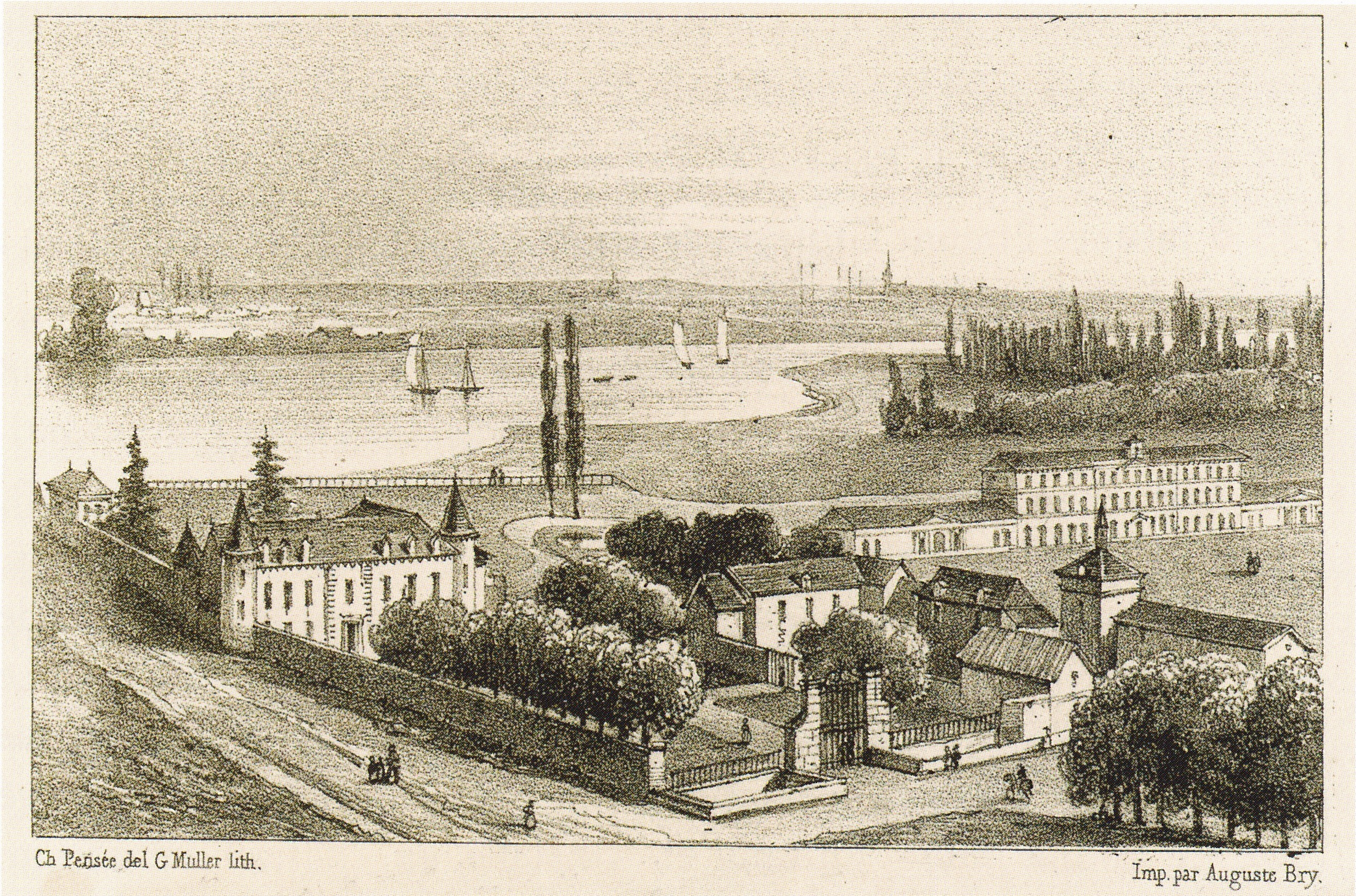
View of château des Hauts of La Chapelle-Saint-Mesmin, lithograph by Romagnesi after Charles Pensée.

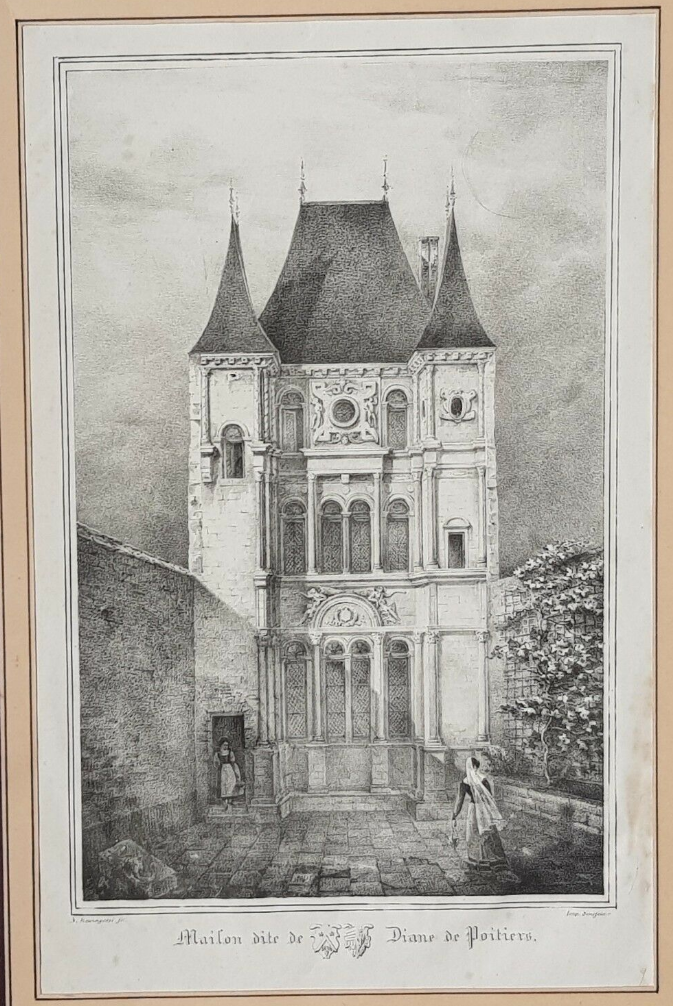
House, said to be that of Diane de Poitiers, lithograph after Charles Pensée

== Bibliography (in French) ==
- Deschamps, Jacques (1990). "Charles Pensée (1799–1871)". Mémoires de la Société d'agriculture, sciences, belles-lettres et arts d'Orléans, v. 55: 115–119.
- Collectif (1872). Catalogue des dessins et aquarelles de Moscow dont l'exposition aura lieu en l'une des salles de la mairie d'Orléans (in French). Paris: Imprimerie Adolphe Lainé..
- Dominique Blum-Passetemps et Jacques Grasser, Charles Pensée, témoin d'Épinal, Bernard Giovanangeli Éditeur, 1992 ISBN 2909034011.
