= Notre-Dame-de-Recouvrance Church (Orléans) =

Coordinates: 47.8987°N 1.9010°E

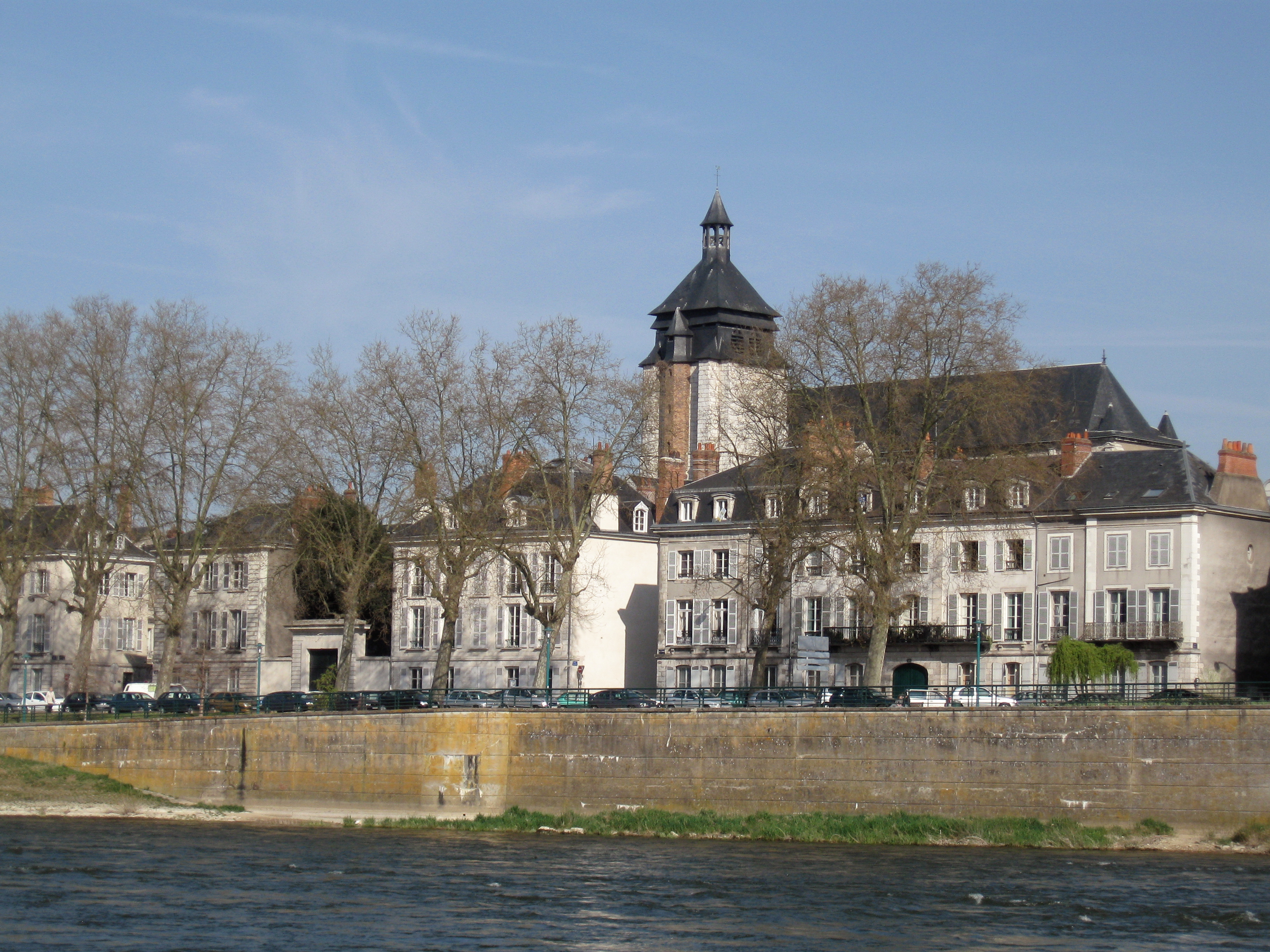
From Quai Barentin.

Notre-Dame-de-Recouvrance Church is a 15th-16th century Roman Catholic church between rue Notre-Dame-de-Recouvrance and Rue de l'Ecu-d'or in the centre of Orléans, near the right bank of the River Loire level with quai Cypierre (route départementale 2152), between pont George-V and pont Maréchal-Joffre.

It was built in the old suburb of 'Avenum' up against the Late Roman fortified enclosure. (Note: p. 365) It was modified and rebuilt several times, particularly after the French Wars of Religion. The 16th century window behind the high altar was made a monument historique in 1904, the church itself in 1918 and its former clergy house in 1928. Since 2008 it has housed the city's traditionalist parish, observing the Tridentine Rite and run by the canons of the Institut du Christ Roi Souverain Prêtre.

== Name ==
"Recovrance" (recovery) may refer to mariners on the Loire "recouvrés" (recovered or found again) after their expeditions, the city being recovered from its 1428-1429 siege by Joan of Arc, or the recovery or rediscovery of Christ in the Temple, which was the church's patronal festival (the second Sunday of January). The mariners' wives often prayed to the Virgin Mary in a small chapel dedicated to Notre-Dame-du-Bon-Secours on the site of the current church, on a half-collapsed tower of the late Roman wall, so that their husbands might return safe and sound.

== Geography ==
It is the city's only church to be so tightly surrounded by buildings and stands amidst a wide variety of buildings, including several 16th-18th century houses which escaped bombing. Rue de l'Ecu-d'Or and the end of rue des Turcies were affected by bombing in 1940 and so the Reconstruction-era buildings are to the south, east and north-east of the church. It is on the edge of the natural region of Val de Loire.

== History ==
=== 11th to 17th centuries ===
The present church is on the site of a primitive chapel dedicated to Notre-Dame de Recouvrance or Notre-Dame de Bon-Secours, which Lottin states dated back to 11th century - it was originally located on a tower of the Late Roman rampart, then built against it. The rampart ran roughly through the middle of the present church. The extension of the enclosure to the current promenades rendered the old wall obsolete: it, along with its ditches, was sold to various quarrymen and other buyers; two of them relinquished their land in 1513 to allow the construction of the present church.

The present building was designed by Jean Mynier, master builder to the Duchy of Orleans, between 1513 and 1519. It was dedicated on 14 April 1519, (Note: p. 370) following a solemn general procession by all the city's parishes from the Orléans Cathedral to the newly completed church. It was notably renovated several times in the 17th and 19th centuries. It had its own parish from 1515 onwards, but shared a curé with Saint-Laurent, the latter being assisted by three vicars, of which two were at Saint-Laurent, which served an essentially rural territory, and one was resident in the parish of Notre-Dame and serving a more and more urban and industrial district.

From 1509 onwards five churches in the city (Saint-Pierre du Martroi, then Saint-Paul, Notre-Dame de Recouvrance, Saint-Laurent and finally Saint-Donatien) were all restored on the same principal - the buttresses and stone vaulting were not rebuilt but replaced by a wooden 'hull' adorned with brickwork and wooden ribs imitating ogival vaults. In 1562, during the French Wars of Religion, the church was badly damaged, destroying several elements such as the central and side vaults, the buttresses and the top of the bell tower, all due to the Huguenots setting fire to the timber. At the start of the 17th century religious services recommenced at Notre-Dame de Recouvrance.

=== 1700-1849 ===
Two bells were baptised on 29 March 1738, whilst Charles Clément was curé of Notre-Dame de Recouvrance and of Saint-Laurent. Important carpentry work was carried out in 1742–1743. From the second half of the 18th century onwards, the parish had serious tensions. Jean-Baptiste Rousselet, curé from 1747 to 1767, was exiled for eight years by the Parliament of Orléans from 1752 to 1760 for refusing to give the sacraments to a Jansenist woman in his parish, who lived on what is now rue Stanislas-Julien. The bishop of Orléans was also exiled for the same reason. In 1760 he returned to his parish, but faced major hostility from his parishioners, who had been won over by Jansenism then by new ideas. Several lawsuits pitted Rousselet against his churchwardens (those who pledged their income to cover the parish's expenses and administered the parish and the church building).

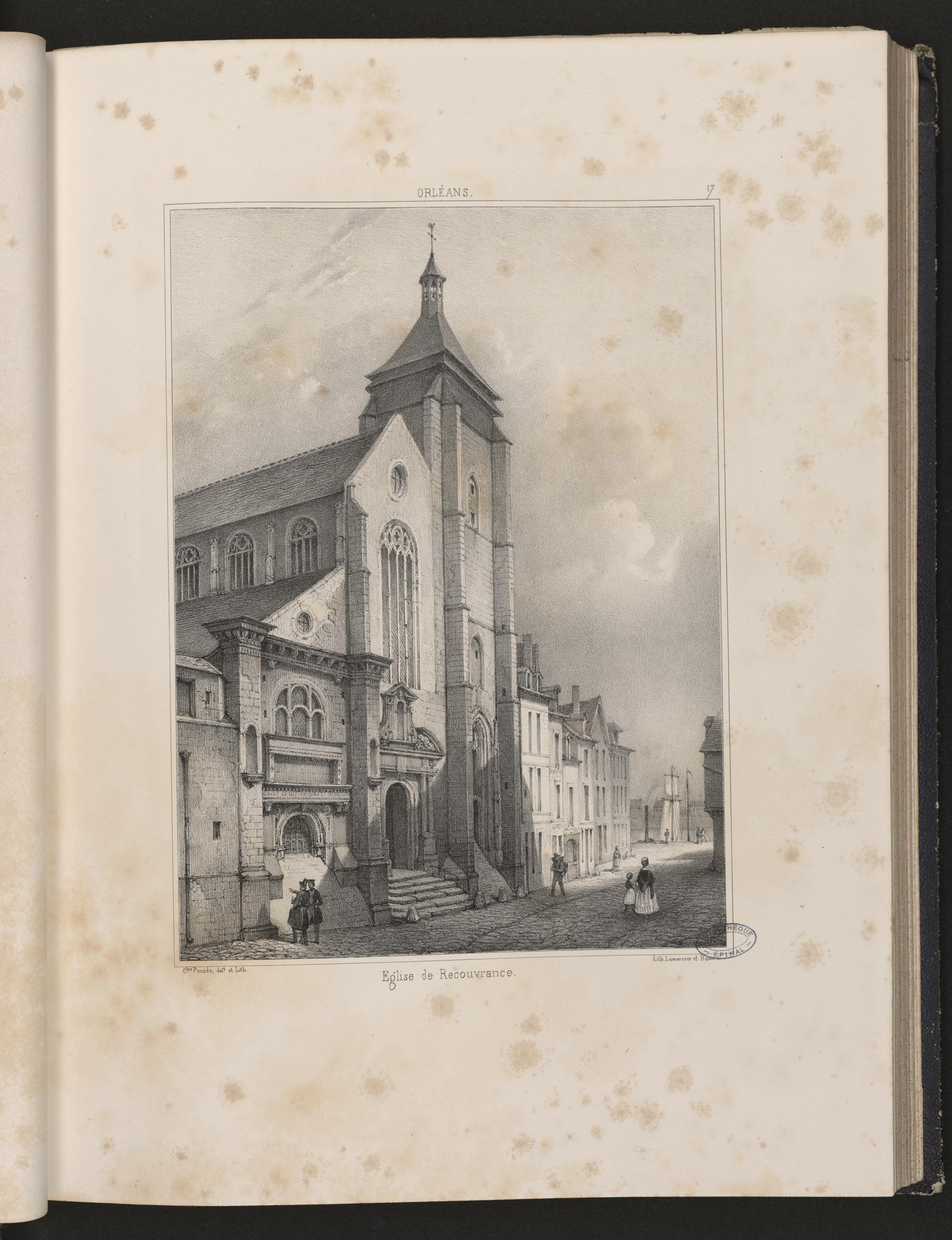
The church in 1849 - drawing by Charles Pensée

The whole building was pillaged during the French Revolution, with both bells falling. The parish was suppressed and merged into that of Saint-Laurent, but the church building survived thanks to the mariners who made it a chapel of ease in 1791 (as well as Saint-Donatien and saint-Aignan), as well as due to its position close to the city port which allowed its transformation into a flour warehouse in 1793. The parishioners bought the building back in 1800 and two years later services there resumed. Its first post-revolutionary curé was Jean-Baptiste Plaisant, who bought the 1520 hôtel particulier at 12 rue Notre-Dame de Recouvrance to serve as his clergy house, giving the building to the parish in 1817.

At the beginning of the 19th century, the church was furnished with neoclassical altars and several paintings; in 1823, it had its own schools, founded and built with money from two industrialists, Messrs. Feyzan and Raguenet of Saint-Albin. In 1824, a mission cross, since lost, was erected within the parish boundaries. The chancel was repaved using the old 17th-century paving from the Sainte-Croix Cathedral in Orléans. Four tiles are engraved with epitaphs of people buried in the cathedral's chancel, primarily clergymen. In 1829, the branch church of Notre-Dame de Recouvrance became a fully independent parish again, along with Saint-Marceau.

=== 1850-1899 ===
In 1857, Louis-Eugène Clesse was made the parish's curé, entrusted with a mission to restore the church to its former glory. He installed three altars, paintings in the choir, cells in the side chapels by Hippolyte Lazerges (1851–1859) and new furnishings. He paid almost 130,000 francs himself out of the 220,000 francs for these works and others on the church's two schools and clergy house. The bishop transferred him to the parish of Saint-Paterne in 1865 to rebuild its church and so Clesse left his successor M. Lambert to complete his building works. The same year a catechists' chapel was built on land to the south of the church on rue de l'Ecu d'Or which Clesse had given for that purpose.

The schools of Notre-Dame-de-Recouvrance Church and Saint-Paul merged in 1866, moving into a large building at the corner of rue des Charretiers and rue des Chats Ferrés, which assisted the city authorities, who lacked money to build such a much-needed school. The church building was reconsecrated on 4 April 1869 and a choir organ by the Loreau family was inaugurated with great pomp on 31 May the following year. The church was relatively unscathed by the Franco-Prussian War in 1870, though like the cathedral and other churches in the city it served as a prison from December 1870 to March 1871. Three bells were cast at the Bollée foundry in 1877 and a fourth in 1878. It still houses the seventh largest bell in the city, a 1,019 kilo bourdon.

=== 20th century ===
In 1900 the nave roof was repaired and several trusses (especially at the west end) replaced by four carpenters, including the journeyman Amyot. The 1905 French law on the Separation of the Churches and the State confiscated all church buildings and assigned them to town halls or (where they were available) charity offices - the former clergy house was given to the city via the charity office, which sold it to the Diocese of Orléans for a symbolic sum of 1 franc in 1995. The 1905 law also led to the seizure of the church's girls' school at 12 rue du Four-à-Chaux (now rue Stanislas-Julien), run by Ruillé sisters - it became an annex to a private college then home to federation of secular organisations.

== Architecture and furnishings ==
=== Structure ===
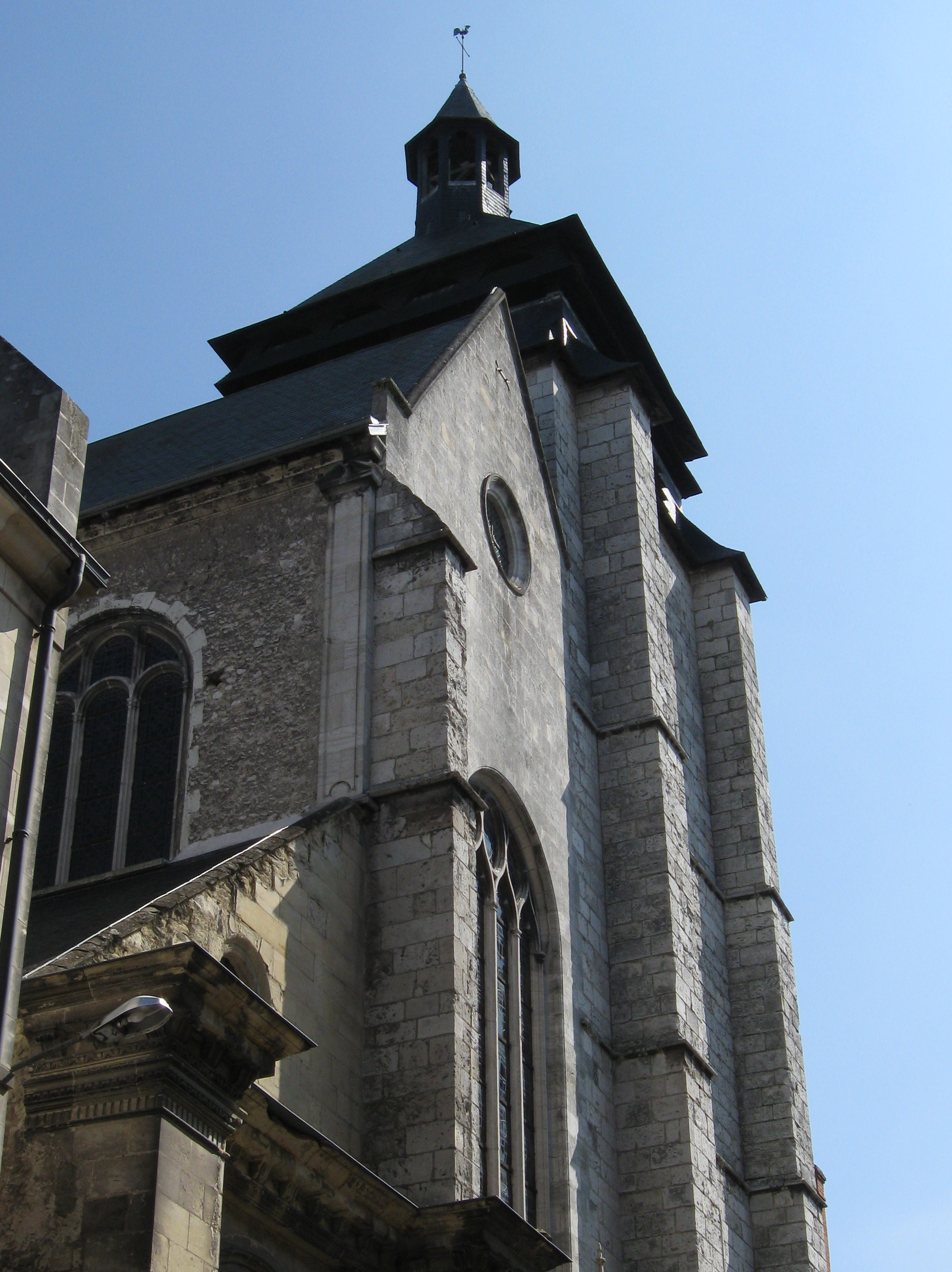
Bell tower.

=== Organ ===
It was made by the famous organmaker Aristide Cavaillé-Coll. It was originally installed as the choir organ at Saint-Thomas-d'Aquin, Paris in 1852. It was then bought by Notre-Dame-de-Recouvrance parish in 1863 and restored and lightly modified by Robert Boisseau in 1962.

The organ has fourteen stops distributed across two manuals and a pedalboard. The great organ manual has 54 notes, while the swell organ has only 37. The pedalboard has 30 notes. The organ and church were both neglected for thirty years and the latter now requires extensive restoration.

=== Furnishings ===
These include a painting of The Christ Child, Saviour of the World dating to 1650-1700 and made a monument historique as a 'titre d'objet' on 29 August 2001. A badly damaged painting of Christ Among the Doctors hangs over the confessional. The church's First World War memorial in local Jouanneau marble was inaugurated on 16 January 1921 following three days of prayers and ceremonies in honour of Joan of Arc.

A 16th-century window shows the Annunciation, Nativity, Adoration of the Magi, the Christ Child at the Breast and the Flight into Egypt. It was also made a monument historique as a titre d'objet on 3 May 1904.

== People buried at the church ==
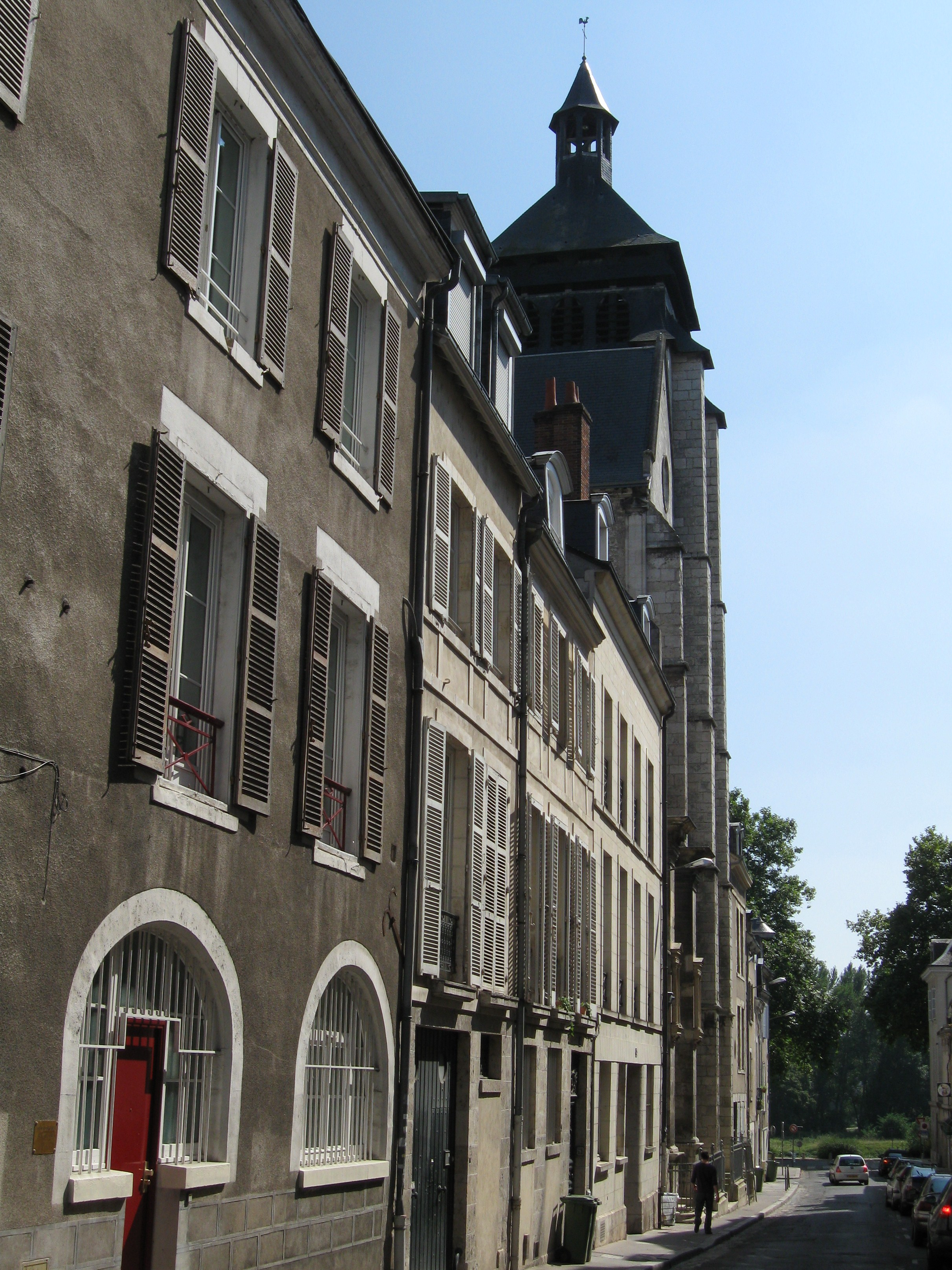
Rue Notre-Dame-de-Recouvrance

Several members of the missionary Saint Isaac Jogues's family are buried at the church. There are also four epitaphs in the choir, one from the 17th century and the others from the 18th century. However, even if there are not tombs under these tiles, these epitaphs very probably came from the old paving of Orléans Cathedral. Since Jogues was beatified then canonised Notre-Dame de Recouvrance became the parish hosting his devotees, although he was baptised in Saint-Hilaire Church, destroyed during the Revolution (though two arcades were discovered in 1910 during the relocation of the house originally sited at 251 Rue de Bourgogne.

== Bibliography (in French) ==
- Eugène Jarry, "La construction de Notre-Dame de Recouvrance", Bulletin de la société archéologique et historique de l'Orléanais, vol. XVIII, no 213, 1917, p. 134-136
- Robert Boitel, "Dessins d'architecture de trois églises d'Orléans : Sainte-Croix, Saint-Aignan, Notre-Dame de Recouvrance", Bulletin de la société archéologique et historique de l'Orléanais, vol. XIV, no 111, 1996, p. 3-16

== External links (in French) ==
- History of the church of Notre-Dame-de-Recouvrance
- The church on the ville d'Orléans site
