= Épinal–Erfurt glossary =

Glossary of Old English

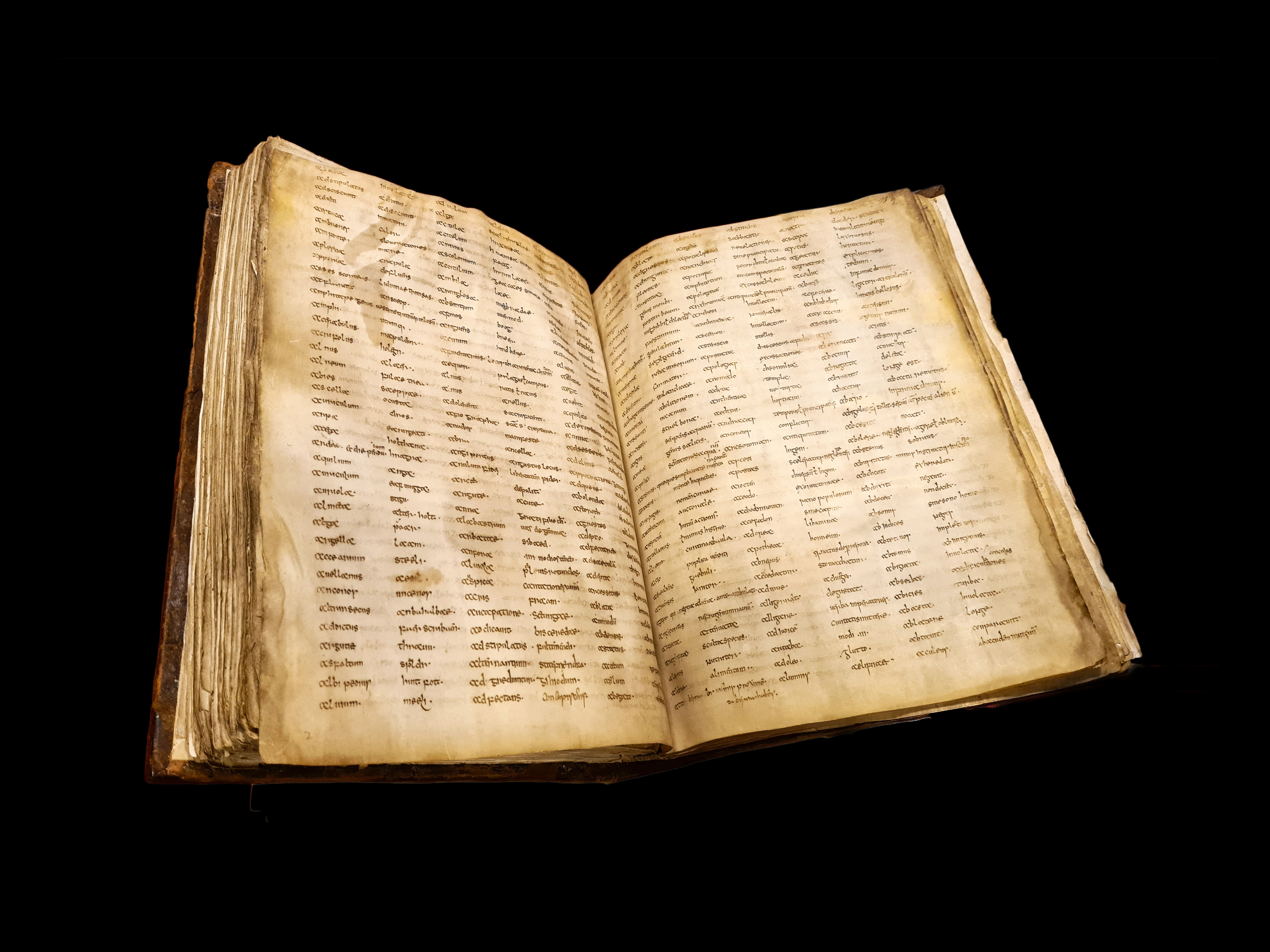
The glossary in the Bibliothèque multimédia intercommunale d'Epinal.

The Épinal–Erfurt glossary is a glossary of Old English. It survives in two manuscripts (from Épinal and Erfurt). It has been described as "the earliest body of written English", and is thought to have been compiled at Malmesbury for Aldhelm (c. 639–709).

== Manuscripts ==
Two main manuscripts of the Glossary exist today:

- Glossaire d'Épinal, Épinal, France, Bibliothèque municipale, MS72 (2), fols. 94–107, around the turn of the seventh to eighth centuries, England (perhaps specifically Southumbria).
- Erfurt, Germany, Wissenschaftliche Bibliothek, MS Amplonianus, MS 2^{o}42, fols. 1–14v, from the first quarter of the ninth century. (This contains other glossaries too; the one shared with the Épinal manuscript is known as "Erfurt I".)

However, parts of the glossary are also found in other manuscripts, most importantly the Second Corpus Glossary, which contains amidst other glosses a complete text of the Épinal–Erfurt glossary, descended independently from a common exemplar.

== Facsimiles ==
- The Épinal Glossary, Latin and Old English, ed. by Henry Sweet, Early English Text Society, o.s. 79b (London: Trübner, 1883).
- Bischoff, Bernhard, Mildred Budny, Geoffrey Harlow, M. B. Parkes and J. D. Pheifer (eds), The Épinal, Erfurt, Werden, and Corpus Glossaries: Épinal Bibliothèque Municipale 72 (2), Erfurt Wissenschaftliche Bibliothek Amplonianus 2o 42, Düsseldorf Universitätsbibliothek Fragm. K 19: Z 9/1, Munich Bayerische Staatsbibliothek Cgm. 187 III (e.4), Cambridge Corpus Christi College 144, Early English Manuscripts in Facsimile, 22 (Copenhagen, 1988).
- Online facsimile of the Épinal MS.

== Editions ==
- The Oldest English Texts, ed. by Henry Sweet, Early English Text Society, o. s. 83 (London: Oxford University Press, 1885), pp. 35–107.
- “The Épinal Glossary, Edited with Critical Commentary of the Vocabulary”, ed. by A. K. Brown, 3 vols (unpublished Ph.D. dissertation, Stanford University, 1969).
- Old English Glosses in the Epinal-Erfurt Glossary, ed. by J. D. Pheifer (Oxford: Clarendon Press, 1974), ISBN 0198111649.
- The Épinal-Erfurt Glossary Project: A Critical Edition of the Épinal-Erfurt Glossary, ed. by Michael W. Herren, David W. Porter, Hans Sauer (Toronto: The Dictionary of Old English, 2019-).

== Commentaries ==
- Lindsay, W. M. (n.d.) [1921]. The Corpus, Épinal, Erfurt and Leyden Glossaries. London: Oxford University Press.
