= Neuvy-en-Sullias Hoard =

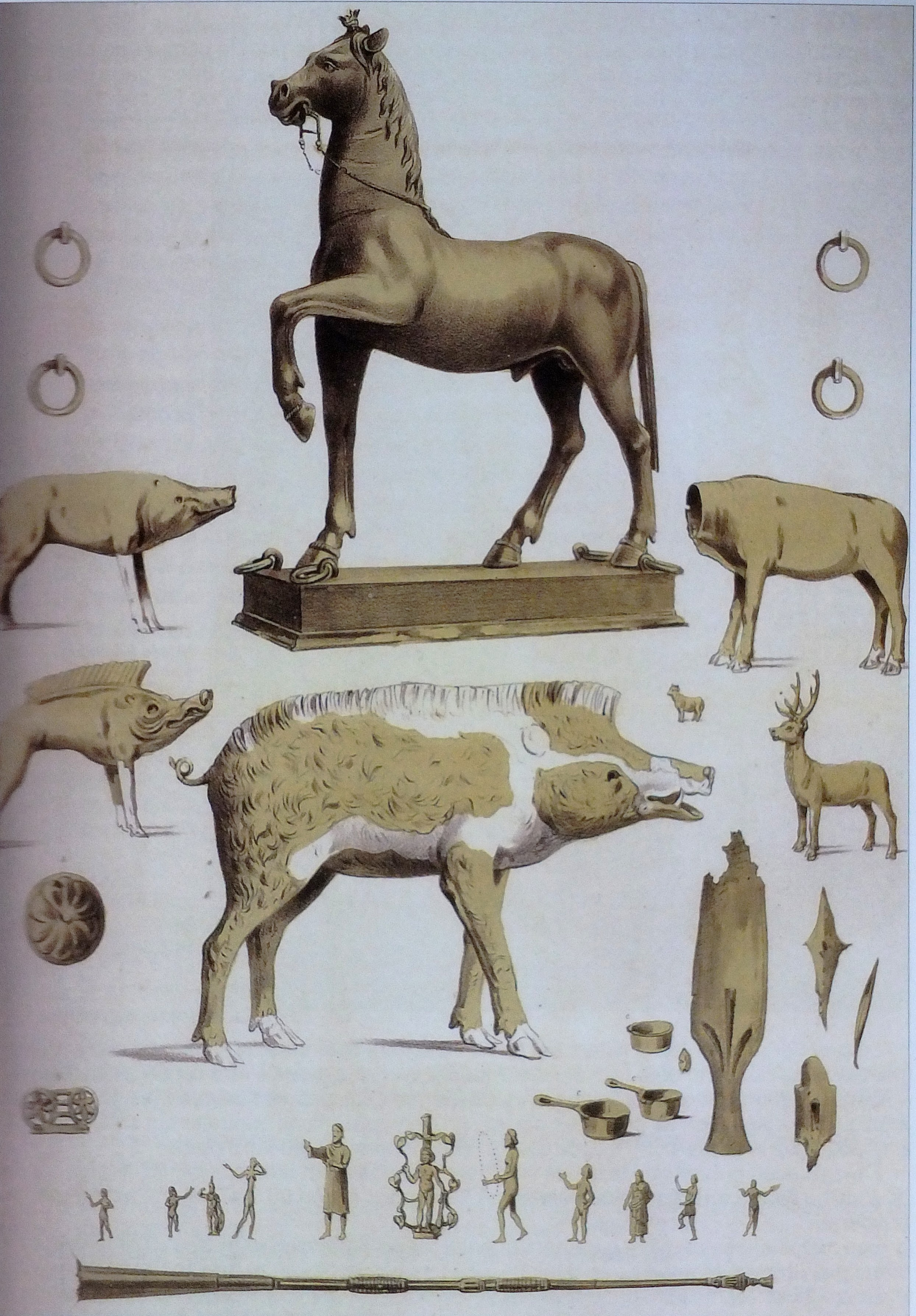
Print of the hoard from 1866.

The Neuvy-en-Sullias Hoard is a Gallic and Gallo-Roman group of bronze objects, including sculptures of animals and two groups of statuettes. It was discovered in 1861 in a sand mine in Neuvy-en-Sullias and is now mostly held in the Musée historique et archéologique de l'Orléanais in Orleans.

Its date is estimated to be between the 1st century BC and 1st century AD, except for the boars, which pre-date the Romans' arrival in Gaul. The hoard was buried around the 2nd or 3rd century AD. Mantellier more precisely dates the horse statue to 150-200 AD, based on its distinctive style and the shape of the letters in the accompanying inscription.

== Discovery ==
On 27 May 1861 workers at a sand mine in the small town of Neuvy-en-Sullias made a chance discovery of a hoard of bronze objects in a brick, stone and tile cache without masonry. The circumstances of the discovery, the lack of surveillance on the site and the complications in dividing up the finds (thanks to issues with the number of finders and the definition of who should have the right to ownership of the objects) all explain the uncertainty on the exact findsite. Local sources mention silver coins and harness items also being in the hoard, but both of these have since disappeared. The city council of Orléans acquired the remaining items in 1864 - most of them are now in that city's archaeological museum but others were reportedly sold separately, some of which have later been rediscovered.

== Individual items ==
It is made up of around thirty bronze objects (all cast bronze except for the boars), which split into three groups:

- animal sculptures
  - a large horse with its left front hoof raised, well made, 1.05m tall, 54 kg without its plinth ;
  - a life-size boar, made of bronze panels, hammered onto a wooden core with decorative details added in repoussé similar to the Soulac-sur-Mer boar standard but in a more naturalistic style, 1.25 m long; its restoration is incomplete and the remaining pieces suggest there was also a second boar statue of almost the same size ;
  - four smaller animal statuettes - two boars, a deer and a cow (25 to 50 cm long) ;
  - classical-style figurine of a bull, possibly imported ;
- ten very stylised so-called "Gallic" statuettes of clothed figures, elongated nudes and full-figured nudes.
- figurines (one each) of Aesculapius, Hercules and Mars, possibly imported

There is also a 1.52 m long trumpet weighing 854 grams.

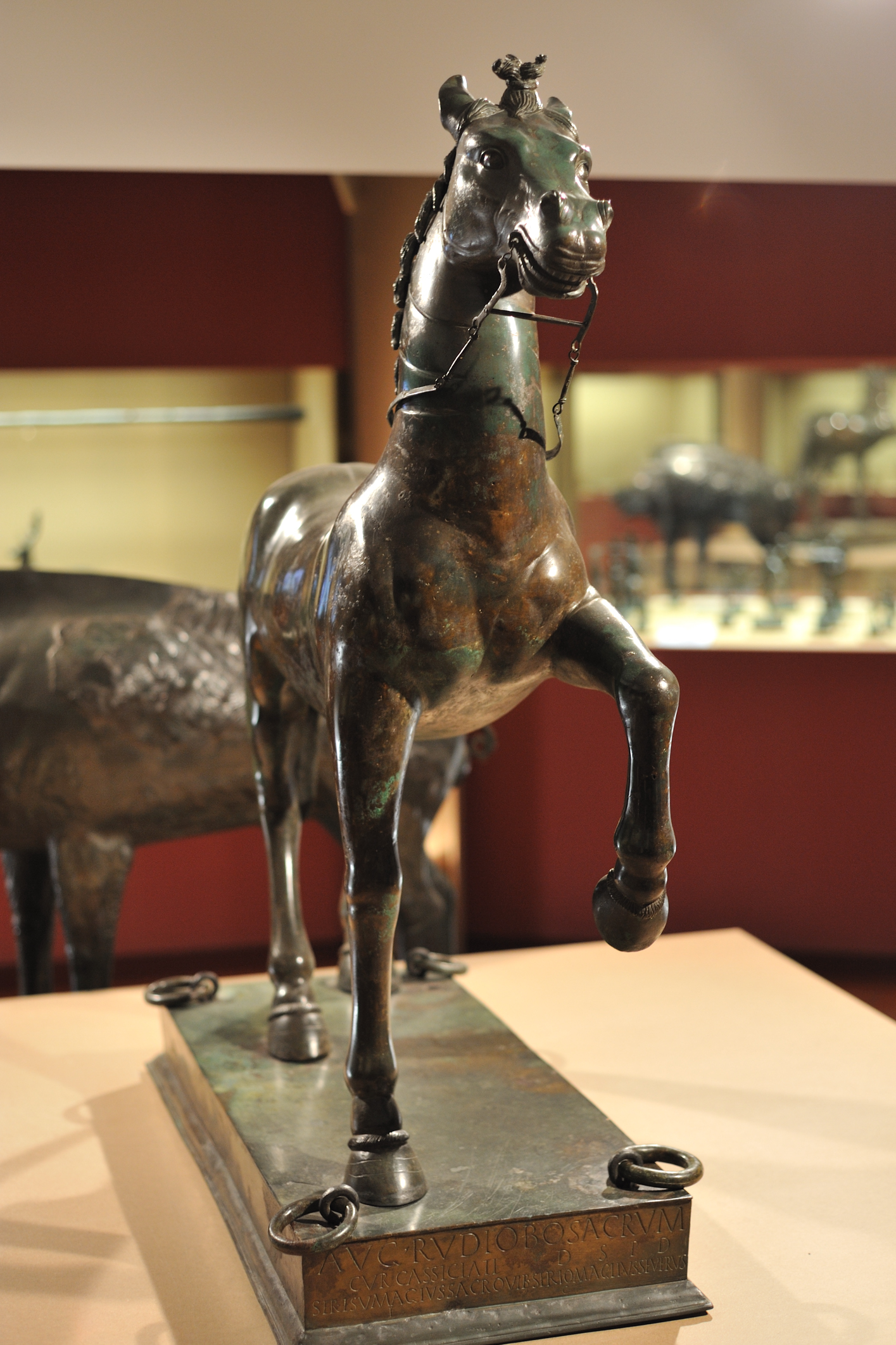
Large horse

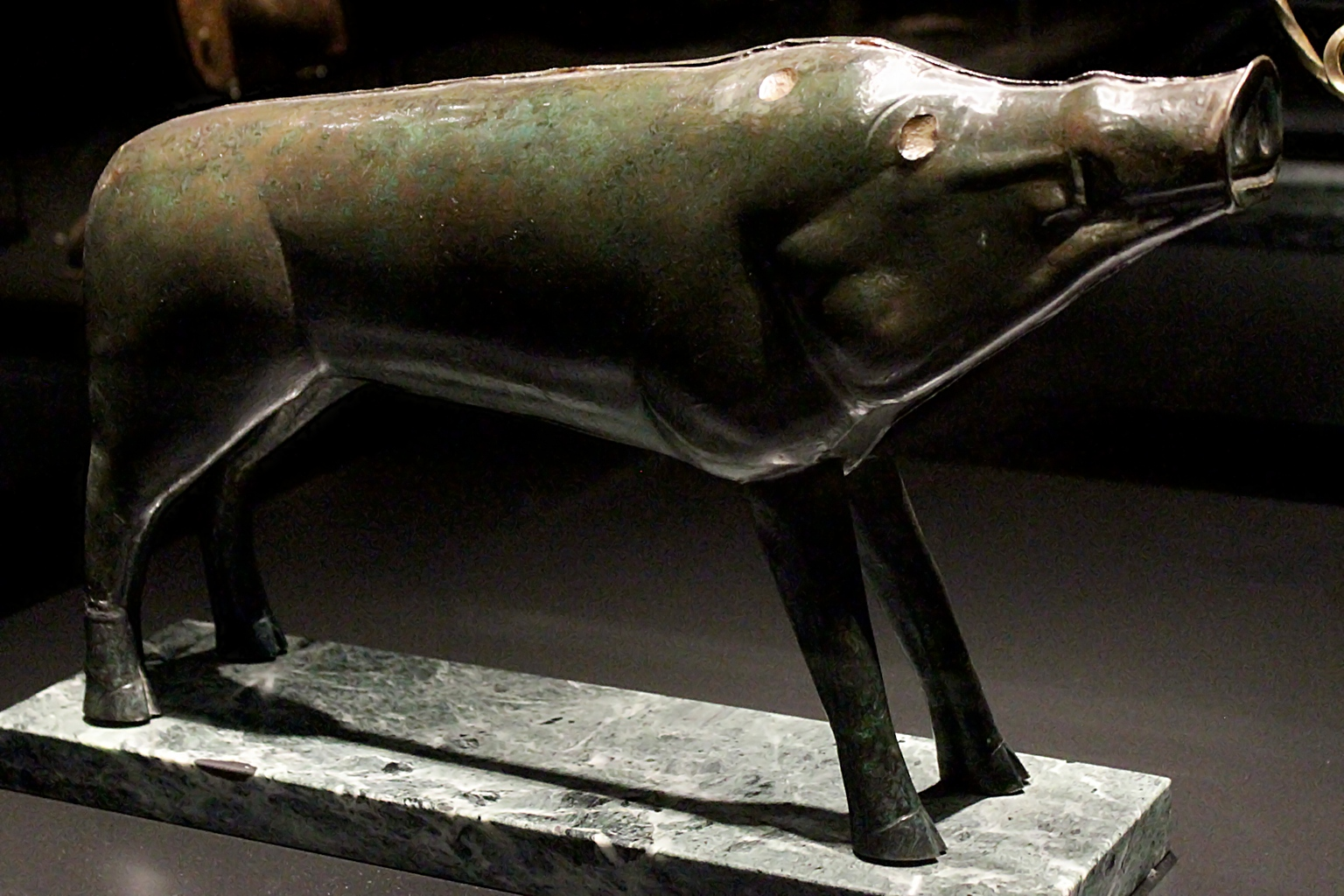
The boar from the hoard on display at the musée de Bibracte

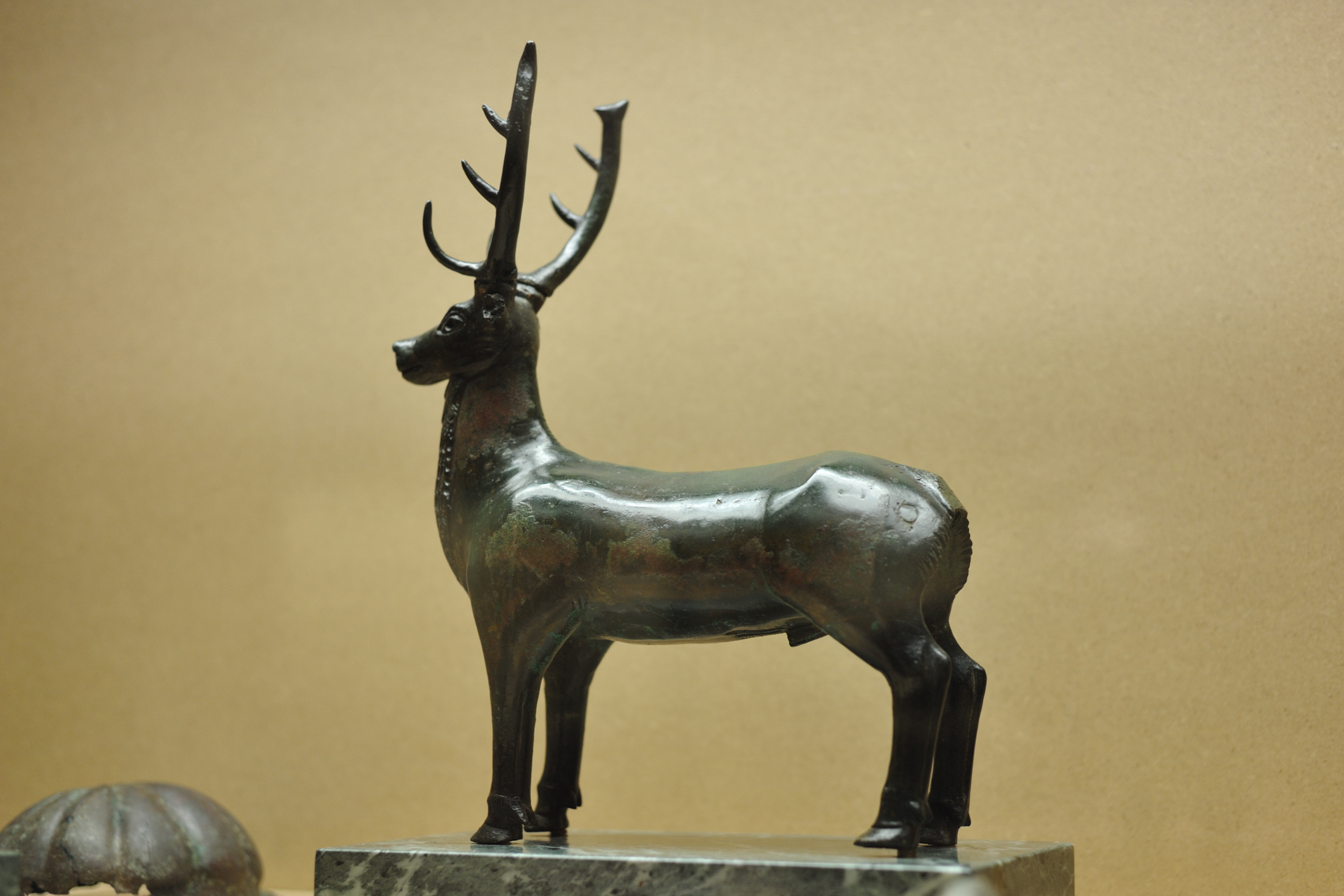
Stag

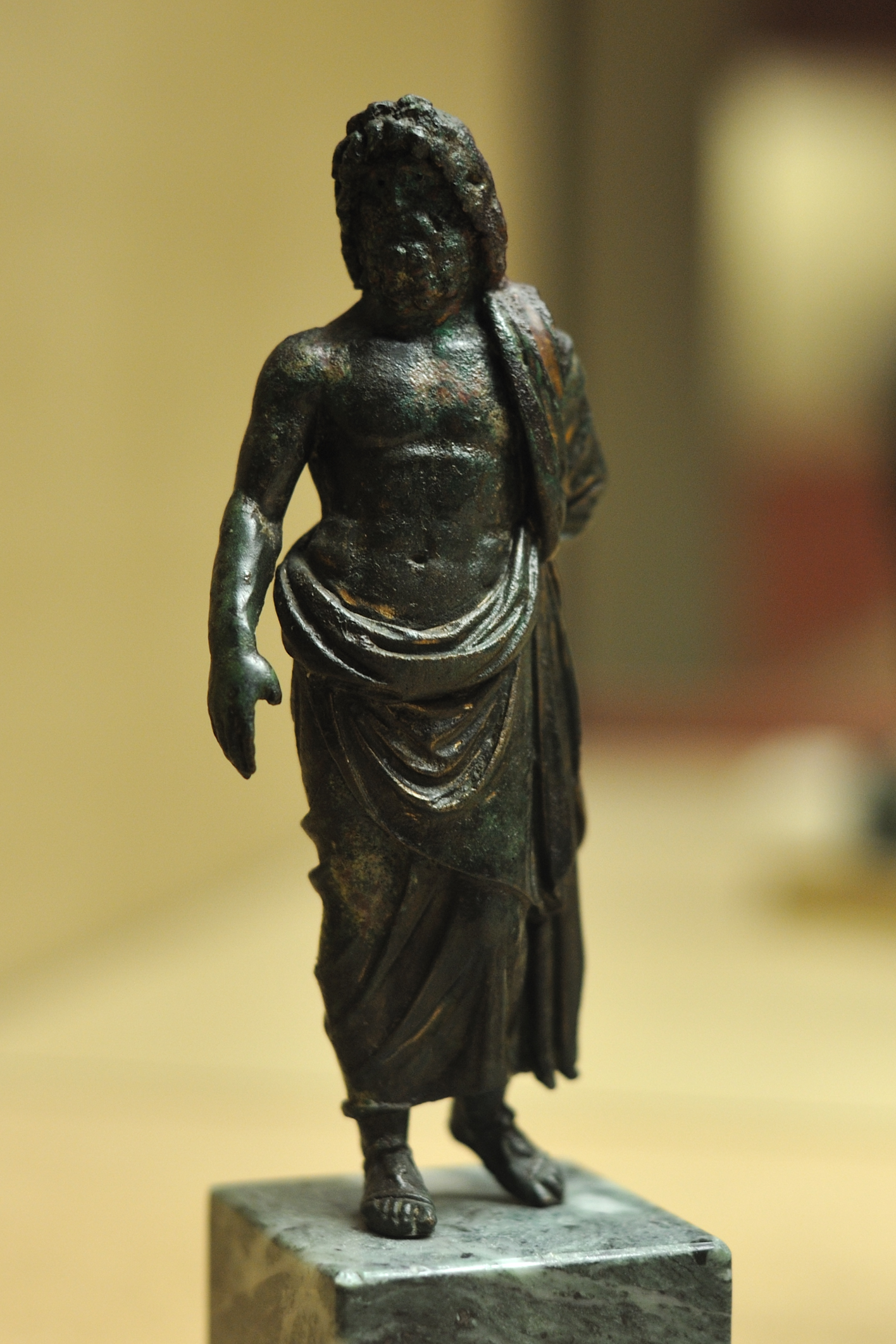
Aesculapius, from the series of mythological statuettes

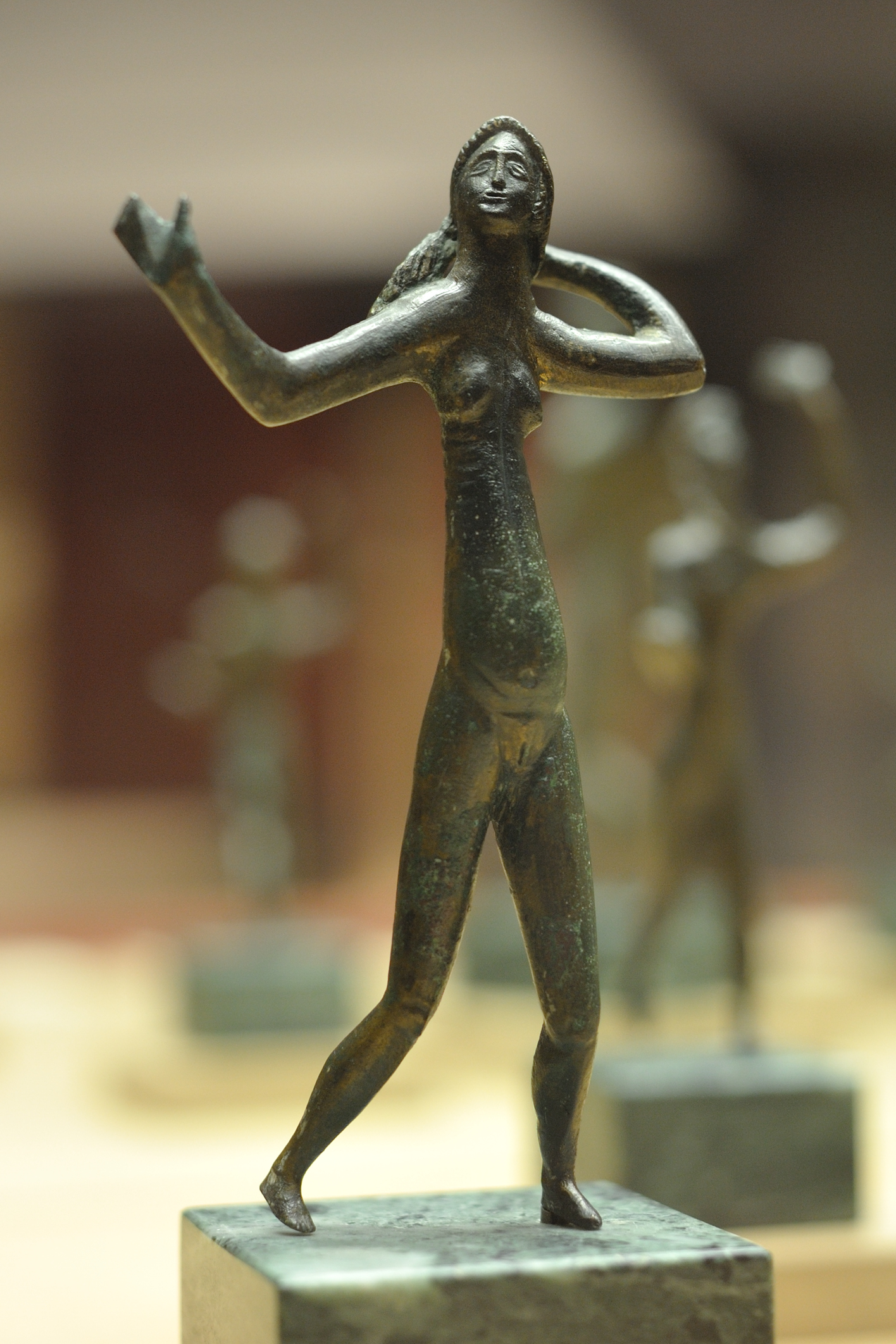
The 'grande danseuse' (large dancing lady)

=== Horse ===
The horse is the masterpiece of the group, with a bridle in spun bronze and the rest cast using the lost wax technique. Several details show that it was cast from a pre-existing model, after fashioning a wax model, and that (before casting) the wax model's main was changed from its original version to a more Romanised style. This proves that statue models circulated in antiquity. Its rather compact or even stocky build shows a new development in horse-breeding - after the Romans arrived the average height of horses in Gaul rose by around 30 cm and they became more robust.

It was designed to be placed high up, perhaps suspended from the four rings on its plinth - its anatomical details seem wrong at eye level but would appear perfect in high perspective, something which also applies to the deer statue. The dedication is fixed on the front of the plinth, showing that this was meant to be the side facing the viewer. The modelling of the head is extremely refined but that of the tail is much cruder, seemingly the only detail where the maker did not lavish any attention.

=== 'La Grande Danseuse' ===
The most famous work in the hoard is the 'grande danseuse' (large dancing woman), 13.5 cm tall. It shows a long-limbed nude woman in a gracious dancer's pose reminiscent of Giacometti or Amedeo Modigliani. It first gained fame through the Pérennité de l'art gaulois exhibition in Paris in 1955. It was admired by the French writer and politician André Malraux, who chose it to illustrate his art-essay collection Les Voix du silence and it was also been reproduced and sold in the Louvre plaster casts series.

== Historical studies ==
Like all isolated discoveries by chance, there is no associated evidence to make any guess at the hoard's origins, function or date. There are several theories - a bronze-smelter's cache ready to be reused, robbers' loot, or a temple treasury hidden for safety during dangerous times.

The first complete study of the hoard was by Philippe Mantellier in 1864 Another occurred between 2003 and 2006, giving rise to a seminar in Orléans in June 2007 and two exhibitions, one at the musée des beaux-arts d'Orléans (13 March-26 August 2007) and in Bavay (15 January-15 June 2008). This modern research has clarified previously obscure points.

The care taken in creating a shelter for the items rules out the possibility that they were hastily or temporarily deposited as robbers would have. The hoard also does not contain any non-religious items as one would expect from a bronze-smelter's cache. This strongly suggests that they form a religious collection amassed by one or more Gallic temples or fana, with the statuettes perhaps instead coming from a private lararium or family altar.

One previous theory was that the hoard was buried to protect it from invaders in the 4th century, but most of the pieces are distinctly Gallic in character - boars were typically Gallic and were used in art and war standards before the Romans' arrival. The presumed period in which the hoard was buried was marked by a turn towards a more Romanised mentality. Additionally, religious objects were frequently buried near Gallic sanctuaries. When the cult furnishings were replaced, old offerings were still seen as sacred and so - rather than being melted down - were buried to make room for new ones. This may therefore be the reason for the hoard being buried.

== Dedication ==
The plaque accompanying the horse statue helps identify the god to whom the temple was dedicated, but it can be read two ways, each giving a different god. It was long thought that it was Rudiobus, not attested anywhere else - supporters of that theory argue he was the same as Rudianos, though that god is never referred to as Rudianos or by any other name. The other candidate is Esus, analogous to Jupiter.

The currently-accepted interpretation of the inscription is :

AVG(usto) RVDIOBO SACRVM / CVR(ia) CASSICIATE D(e) S(ua) P(ecunia) D(edit) / SER(vius) ESVMAGIVS SACROVIB SER(vius) IOMAGLIVS SEVERVS / F(aciendum) C(uraverunt). »

which translates as:

"To the August Rudiobus / the curia of the (Vicus) Cassiciacus made this offering, paying for it with his own money. / Servius Esumagius Sacrovir, Servius Iomaglius Severus / had this work carried out."

However, it has also been interpreted as :

« AVG(ustis) RVDIOBO SACRVM / CVR(ator) CASSICIATE D(e) S(ua) P(ecunia) D(edit) / SER(viens) ESV MAG(n)VS SACROVIB(is) SER(viens) I(ovi) O(ptimo) MAGI(n)VS SEVERVS / F(aciendum) C(uraverunt) »

which translates as :

"To the august supreme gods / the administrator of the place of worship made this offering at his own cost. / Sagrovibis, the Great Servant of Esus, and Severus, the Great Servant of Most Beneficent Jupiter / undertook its execution."

According to this second interpretation, which unlike the first takes the Gallic context into account, the sanctuary was dedicated to Esus, a powerful Gallic god, with the addition of the Roman god Jupiter but without assimilating the two gods together, which corresponds well to the Gallic mentality. The Gauls were adept at a cultural sleight of hand by which they could carry on venerating all their own gods whilst pretending otherwise. For example, the Romans translated the inscription "DEAE ARTIO" as "DEA ARTIUM" ("goddess of the arts", i.e. Minerva), whereas "artiom" or "artion", with a final nasal consonant that was commonly elided, actually meant "of bears" and the divinity in question thus had nothing to do with anything Roman.

== Stamps ==
On 10 June 1996 La Poste issued a 6,70 franc stamp in the 'tableau' format, showing an engraving of the large horse from the hoard by Pierre Albuisson

== Bibliography ==
- (in French) Collectif (2007). Le cheval et la danseuse. À la redécouverte du trésor de Neuvy-en-Sullias (in French). Somogy. ISBN 2757200690.

== External links (in French) ==
- Panorama de l'art
- L'Orléanais au temps des Gaulois, on the conseil général du Loiret site, 29 January 1999
