= Bibliothèque multimédia intercommunale =

Library in Épinal, Vosges, France

Coordinates: 48.1778°N 6.4587°E

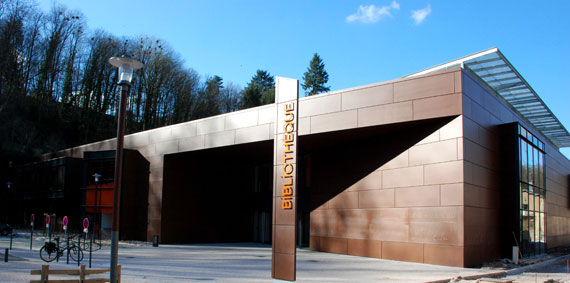

The bibliothèque multimédia intercommunale (bmi) is a public library in Épinal, Vosges, France, serving the territory of the communauté d'agglomération d'Épinal. It is supported by five other libraries - the bmi network one in Golbey and the médiathèques in Thaon-les-Vosges, Bains-les-Bains, Xertigny and Deyvillers.

== History ==
=== Revolution and bibliothèque de l'École ===
The revolutionary confiscations in the Vosges department seized the abbey libraries from Senones, Étival, Moyenmoutier and Chaumousey and the Princes of Salm-Salm. The confiscations in Moyenmoutier were particularly notable, taking the books and woodwork from the abbey there to the École centrale in Épinal.

However, Épinal's first public library only opened in 1825, with 18,000 manuscripts, old books and prints. The collection was so large as to need the Collège building on place Lagarde and so the library was known as the bibliothèque de l'École. The abbey panelling was taken down at Moyenmoutier in June 1824 and put back up the following May.

=== The Maison Romaine ===
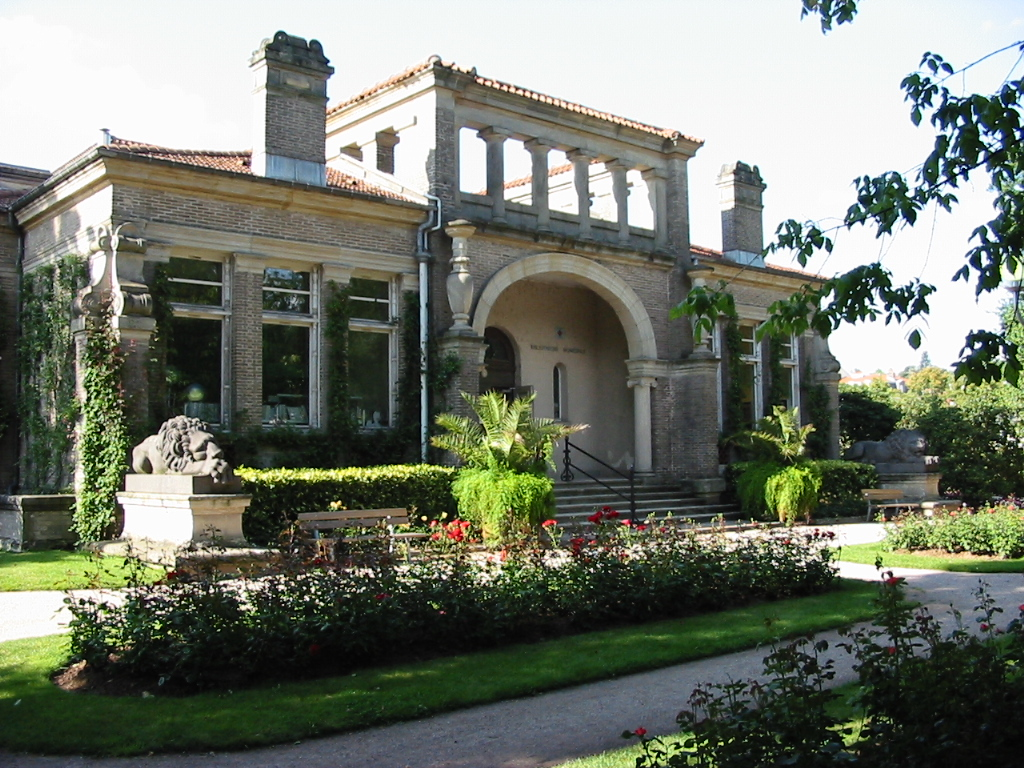
The Maison romaine.

Throughout the 19th century gifts and acquisitions expanded the library's collections. Its site became too small and so in 1902 the town council bought the 'Maison Romaine' (literally the 'Roman House'), which was later made a monument historique in 1990. They planned to install the woodwork and collections in the uncompleted part, the building with columns.

=== 21st century ===
In 2005 the town council opened an architectural competition to design a new home for the library, won by the Chabanne & partenaires studio. · Their ambition was to create a square space representing "a link between the past and the present", in other words a dialogue between the library's history and the wish to create a modern and innovative space capable of holding all the town's collections.

A contract was signed between the project owners, the town councils of Epinal and Golbery and the studio. The plan foresaw a total floor space of 5700 square metres and the cost as 8 million euros. It opened on 18 April 2009, with a cube with the woodwork room at its centre, forming the heart of the building, with the various different public reading rooms opening off it. Before being installed in the new building that woodwork underwent restoration - since they had been classed as monuments historiques on 5 August 1994, this was led by the chief architect to monuments historiques Pierre Bortolussi and carried out by the Ateliers Jean-Baptiste Chapuis.

== Network ==
The network of libraries for the Communauté d’Agglomération d’Épinal consists of the BMI in Épinal and six other libraries:

- the bmi in Golbey ;
- the médiathèque in Thaon-les-Vosges ;
- the médiathèque in Deyvillers ;
- the médiathèque for Val de Vôge in Bains-les-Bains ;
- the Xertithèque, the médiathèque in Xertigny
- the médiathèque in Vincey.

The bmi opened in April 2009, followed by the bmi in Golbey, which was renovated. The médiathèques in Thaon-les-Vosges and Deyvillers joined the network in January and July 2013 respectively. The médiathèque in Bains-les-Bains joined it on 1 January 2017, as did that in Xertigny in January 2022.

== Collections ==
=== Adult ===
- comics and manga
- sci-fi, crime, horror, romance novels
- essays, poetry, plays, diaries and letters
- historical fiction
- documentary books and DVDs on philosophy, psychology, religion, society, languages, science, technology, art, sport, geography, history and tourism
- audiobooks, large print books and specialist equipment for those with sight problems
- dictionaries, grammars and other books for learning English, German, Arabic, Chinese, Spanish, ancient Greek, Hebrew, Italian, Latin, Japanese, Portuguese, Russian, Turkish and French as a foreign language
- works on Lorraine and the Vosges

=== Young people ===
Around 35,000 documents for those aged 0 to 14 :

- books : comics, manga, sci-fi and crime novels, documents replying to all questions
- magazines and journals on news, science, literature and animals
- DVDs : films, animation, TV series, documentaries
- audiobook CDs
- two TVs for listening to music or watching DVDs
- 7800 albums and magazines
- CDs and DVDs of children's songs, lullabies, stories and nursery rhymes
- storybooks

=== "Musique et Images" ===
- 5800 DVDs of films;
- Over 800 DVDs of documentaries ;
- 13 000 CDs ;
- 450 methods and partitions ;
- Over 3,500 books on cinema, music, photography and theatre

=== Newspapers and magazines ===
170 magazines, reviews and newspapers, split into three themes:

- News - local, national and international newspapers
- Lifestyle - women's press, health, family, cooking
- Knowledge - philosophy, literature, economics, finance, nature, geography, art, science, history, sport, politics

=== Special collections ===
==== Manuscripts and incunables ====
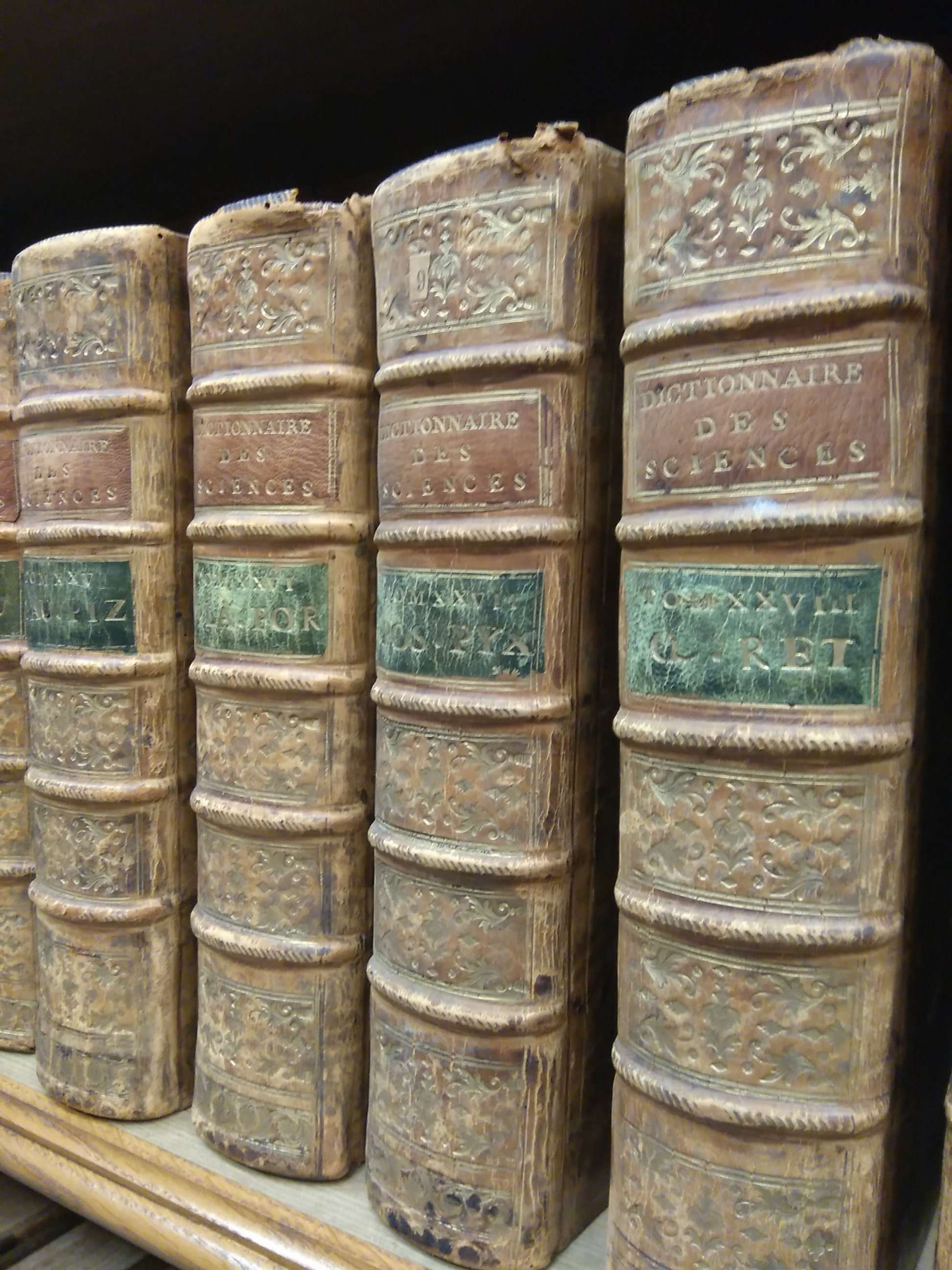
Some of the bmi's special collections.

It holds 327 manuscripts, dating from the 8th century to the present day, mostly from the revolutionary seizures from the abbeys of Senones and Moyenmoutier. Two of these are 8th century ones from Moyenmoutier:

- The Épinal-Erfurt glossary (MS 72 P/R), dated to 734 and with 3200 inscriptions, including 950 in Old English, making it a major document for understanding that language in its earliest form. Images from its pages are now on the windows of the bmi.
- Letters of Saint Jerome (MS 149 P/R), copied in 744 at Murbach Abbey in Alsace. It was borrowed by Dom Hyacinthe Alliot, abbot of Moyenmoutier, at the end of the 17th century and never returned.

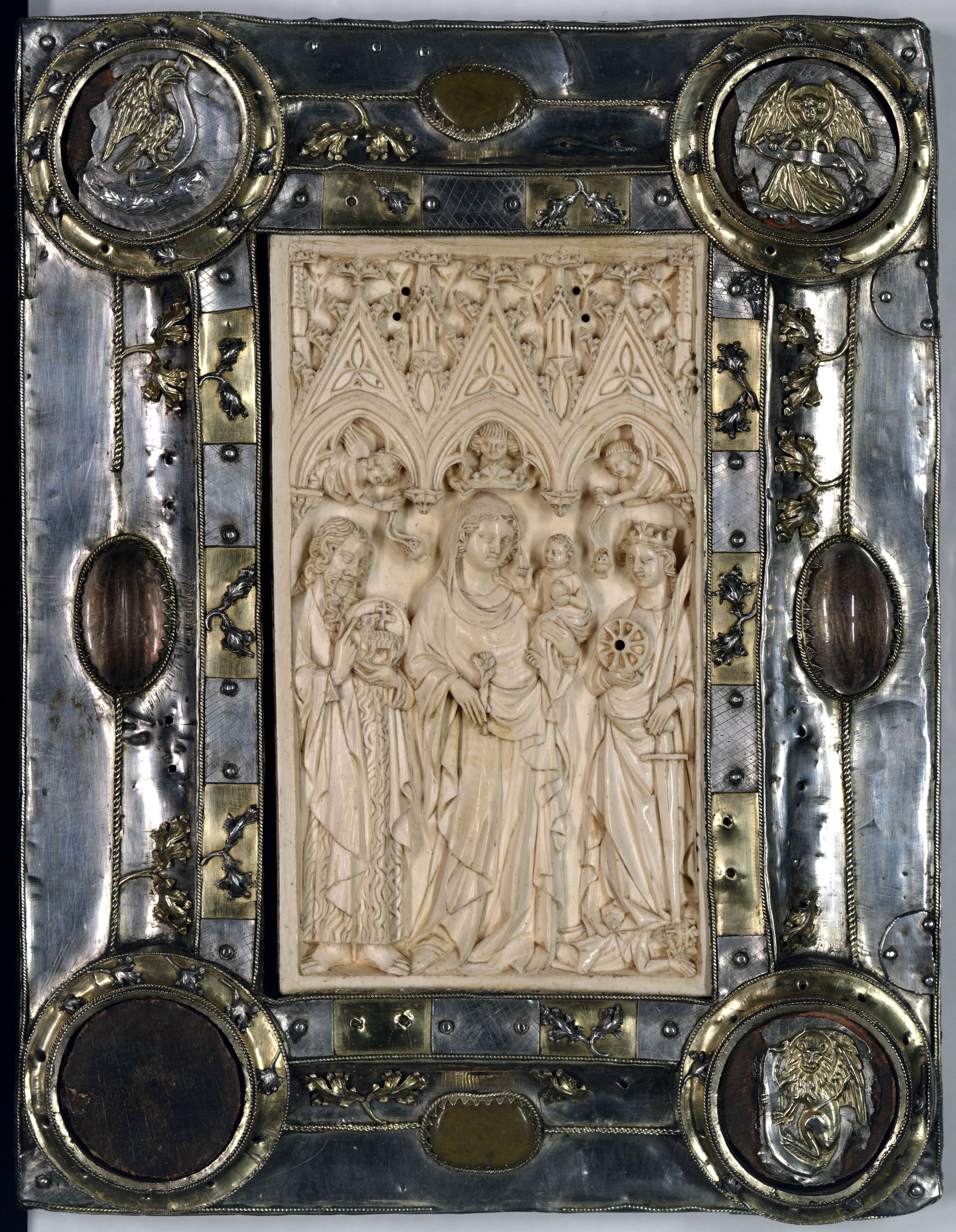
Front cover of the binding of the Purple Gospels

It also holds the 'Purple Gospels' (MS 265 P/R), dating to the 9th century and originally belonging to the Chapter of Épinal. It has a precious metal and ivory binding, whilst the writing on its purple parchment pages is in gold. It also contains two 15th-century miniature illuminations by the Master of Saint-Goery. There are also three manuscript books of hours in the bmi - one of them is 15th century, was used in the Diocese of Bayeux (MS 243(100) P/R) and contains 28 illuminated miniatures attributed to the Master of the Yale Missal.

The bmi also holds a collection of medieval musical manuscripts, the second largest such collection in Lorraine after that in Verdun. It was studied by Christian Meyer and has been published. Fifty-four of its manuscripts have been numbered and are available on line on the bmi's catalogue.

The bmi's 102 incunables are also from the revolutionary seizures at the Vosges abbeys and from the collections of the princes of Salm. Two of them have been numbered and are available online.

==== Local studies ====
It holds a vast collection of printed and manuscript works about Lorraine and Vosges, again originating in the revolutionary seizures but expanded through later and recent acquisitions.

==== Newspapers ====
It also holds an important collection of historic newspapers from the local and national press, such as the first French periodicals Journal des Savants (1672) and Mercure Français (1611). It also houses the very first periodical published in Epinal, the Almanach civique du département des Vosges, begun in 1791. The many local titles include La Semaine religieuse de Saint-Dié, les Annales de la Société d'émulation des Vosges and Eux et nous : journal des prisonniers de guerre de Remiremont as well as more classic former periodicals such as Le Télégramme des Vosges and Le Journal des Vosges.

==== Prints ====
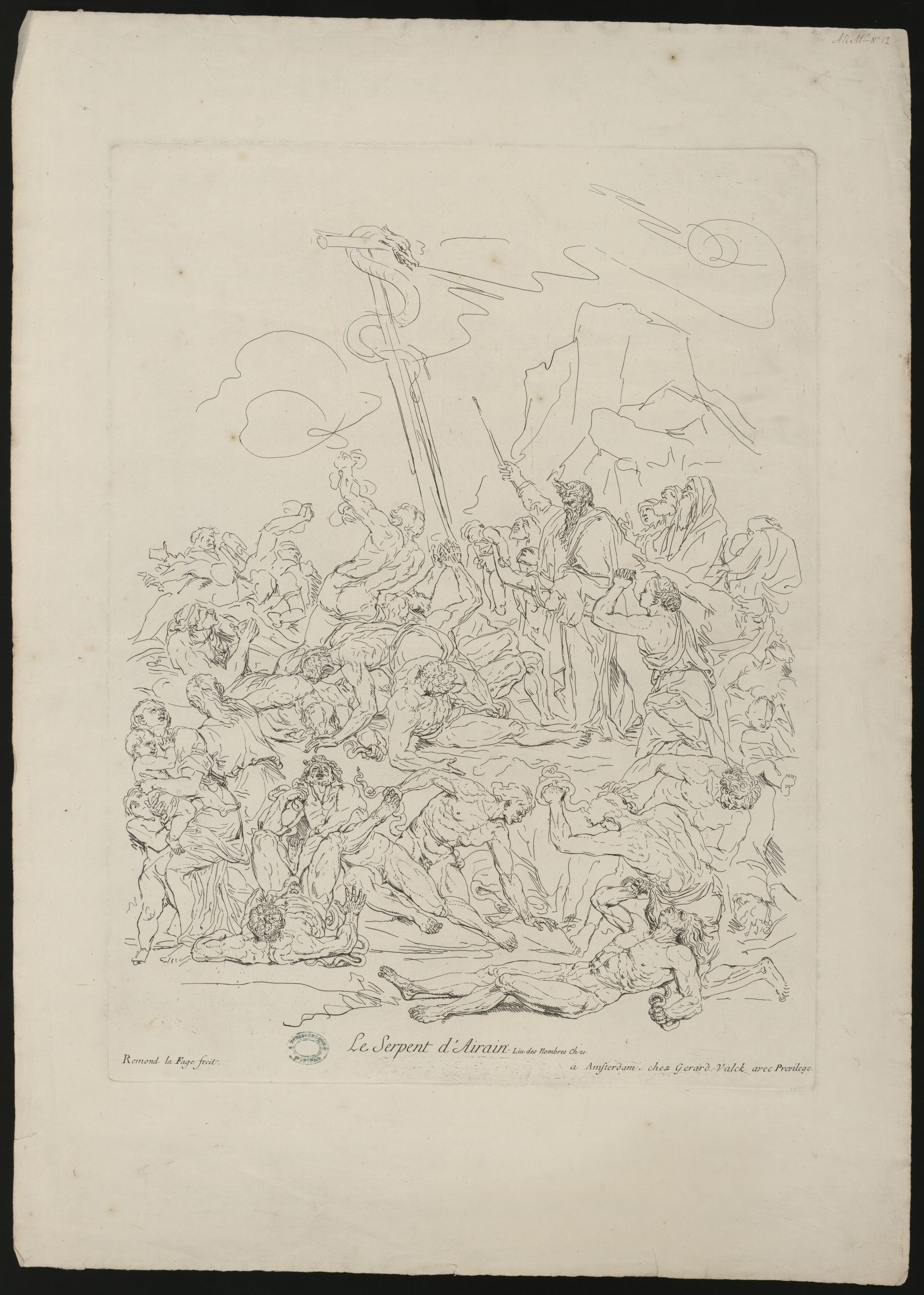
The Brazen Serpent (1670 - 1684), by Raymond Lafage. Print from the collection of the princes de Salm.

First formed when the library was new, this collection is mainly made up of prints in folios, from the collection of the princes of Salm, and large collections of prints such as Piranesi's Prisons or Gautier d'Agoty's l'Atlas anatomique. However, it does also hold 19th century prints and lithographs by artists such as Charles Pensée and E. Ravignat and 5,500 postcards of Épinal and Vosges (almost 4,000 of which have been numbered and are accessible online on Limédia galeries). Some of these postcards were taken by Paul Testart. The bmi also holds maps, plans and First World War posters.

==== Personal collections ====
It houses Richard Rognet's personal collection of manuscripts, typescripts, drafts, first editions, letters, press cuttings, photographs and documents, donated by the poet himself from 2002 onwards. The work of the regional writer René Perrout (1863–1920) was also left to the town in 2013, with the bmi holding the works, brochures, letters and some manuscripts from that collection.

It also houses other collections relating to other people from the town, such as the personal library of Philippe Séguin, its mayor from 1983 to 1997 and deputy for Vosges from 1978 to 2002, left to the town and deposited in the bmi in 2012. That library consists of 6800 documents, mainly books from 1975 to 2000, reflecting political, social, sporting and cultural life in the department and witnessing to Séguin's fondness for it, his adoptive land. Many of the books were bound by their owner and more than 2,000 had a dedication.

==== Objects ====
A hand-drawn globe was bought by the town council in 1828, it was made by Étienne Forfillier, principal of the collège in Mirecourt. It is entirely hand-drawn and made in an artisanal manner. Each hemisphere is made up of 38 spindles made of laid paper, glued directly onto the wooden ball. It is on show in the bmi's 'salle des boiseries'.

It also holds a very large portfolio of prints, made of boiled cardboard covered in green parchment, from the collection from the princes of Salm. It was restored by the BnF (Site Richelieu) conservation studio in 2006.

== Services ==
=== Onsite ===
- Onsite reading all documents, watching films on the TVs, listening to CDs on headphones
- Subscription for loaning up to 15 documents for three weeks, renewable on request
- Interlibrary loans
- Work rooms, auditorium and multimedia studio
- Photocopiers
- Groups
- Events : conferences, storytime, exhibitions, film showings
- Services for the disabled
- Research room for special collections

=== Beyond the library ===
- The Chapitre network : the bmi's corrections are regularly renewed, including large print books and documentaries ;
- Reading in the centre hospitalier Émile-Durkheim : the bmi provides a selection of books for 'Lire et faire lire' association volunteers, who tell stories for hospitalised children each Friday afternoon ;
- the bmi provides a reading room each summer in the port of Épinal, on Wednesdays and Saturdays from 14:30 to 17:30 and in social centres on Tuesdays from 14:00 to 16:00

=== Digital resources ===
==== Internet and Wifi ====
- Over sixty computers with internet access and numbered rooms for using programmes on tablets ;
- WiFi.

==== Video games ====
- PS5, Xbox One, Wii and Wii U consoles
- portable consoles (Switch, DS, 2DS, 3DS, PSVita) ;
- over a hundred recent games of all types and for all ages ;
- animations : tournaments (League of Legends, Hearthstone: Heroes of Warcraft, etc.), Retrogaming, etc.

==== Other ====
- Limédia Galeries, Kiosque and Mosaïque databases.

== See also ==
- List of libraries in France

== Bibliography ==
- MASSON André, « Deux bibliothèques du XVIIIème siècle de plan exceptionnel : Moyenmoutier et Cambrai », Bulletin des bibliothèques de France, vol. 7, 1964, p. 277-281
- DION Marie-Pierre (1991). Patrimoine des bibliothèques de France : un guide des régions - Champagne-Ardenne, Lorraine (in French). Vol. 3. Paris: Payot. pp. 52–59.
- GASSE-GRANDJEAN Marie-josé (1994). Histoire de Terres de Salm : recueil d'études consacrées au Comté et à la Principauté de Salm, à l'occasion de la célébration du bicentenaire de la réunion de la Principauté à la France (in French). Saint-Dié des Vosges: Société Philomatique Vosgienne.
- HOCH Philippe (1998). Trésors des bibliothèques de Lorraine (in French). Paris: Association des bibliothécaires français. ISBN 2-900177-16-2.
- EMERY Marc (2011). Global Architecture : Chabanne et partenaires. Paris: AAM éditions.
- PETITDEMANGE André (2012). Senones - Moyenmoutier - Etival, Pays d'Abbayes en Lorraine (in French). Chaumont: Dominique Guéniot.
- Collectif (2010). La croix monastique des Vosges - Terre D'abbayes en Lorraine (in French). Saint-Dié des Vosges: Société philomatique vosgienne.
- "L'abbaye de Moyenmoutier". Pays des abbayes (in French).
- CARLIER Gaétan (2023). Les décors de boiseries dans les bibliothèques municipales françaises (Maitrise) (in French). Vol. 1. Enssib.

== External links (in French) ==
- Official site
- Communauté d’Agglomération d’Épinal site
- Limedia Galeries - numbered special collections
- Limedia Kiosque - numbered historic newspapers
