= Archaeological site of Grand =

Archaeological site in Grand, France

- Andésina
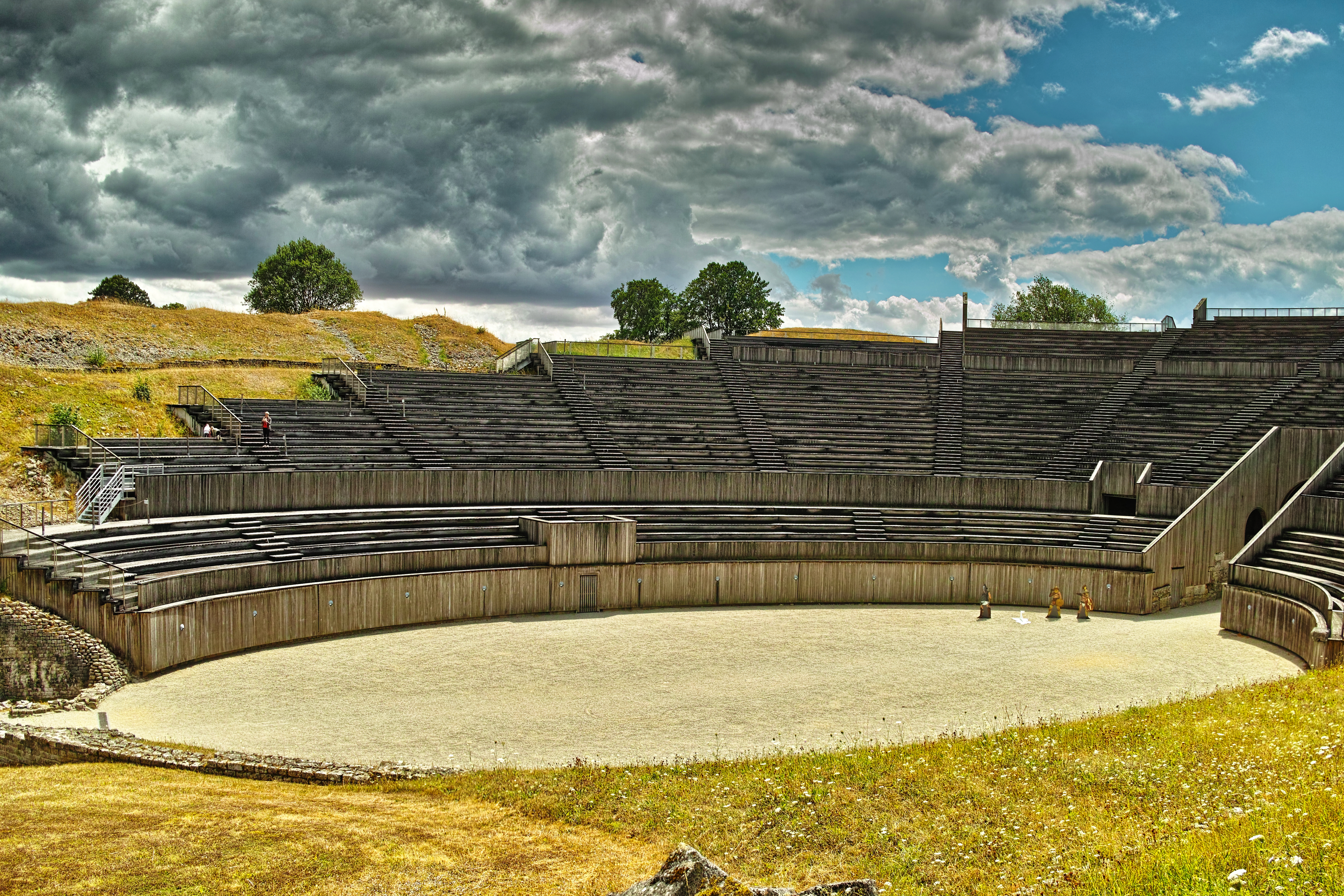
- Amphitheater of Grand
- Interactive map of Archaeological site of Grand
- 48.3853°N 5.4910°E
- Location: Grand, France
- Region: Grand Est

The archaeological site of Grand contains a wide amphitheater and a mosaic of 232 m^{2}. It is located in the French department of Vosges, in the region Grand Est, in France. It was an ancient Gallo-Roman city named Andésina (15,000-20,000 inhabitants), and is now within a small village called Grand.

The amphitheater was built at the end of the 1st century and can contain 17,000 people.

At its center, the mosaic shows a theater scene of the Phasma of Menander and four animals at the four corners.

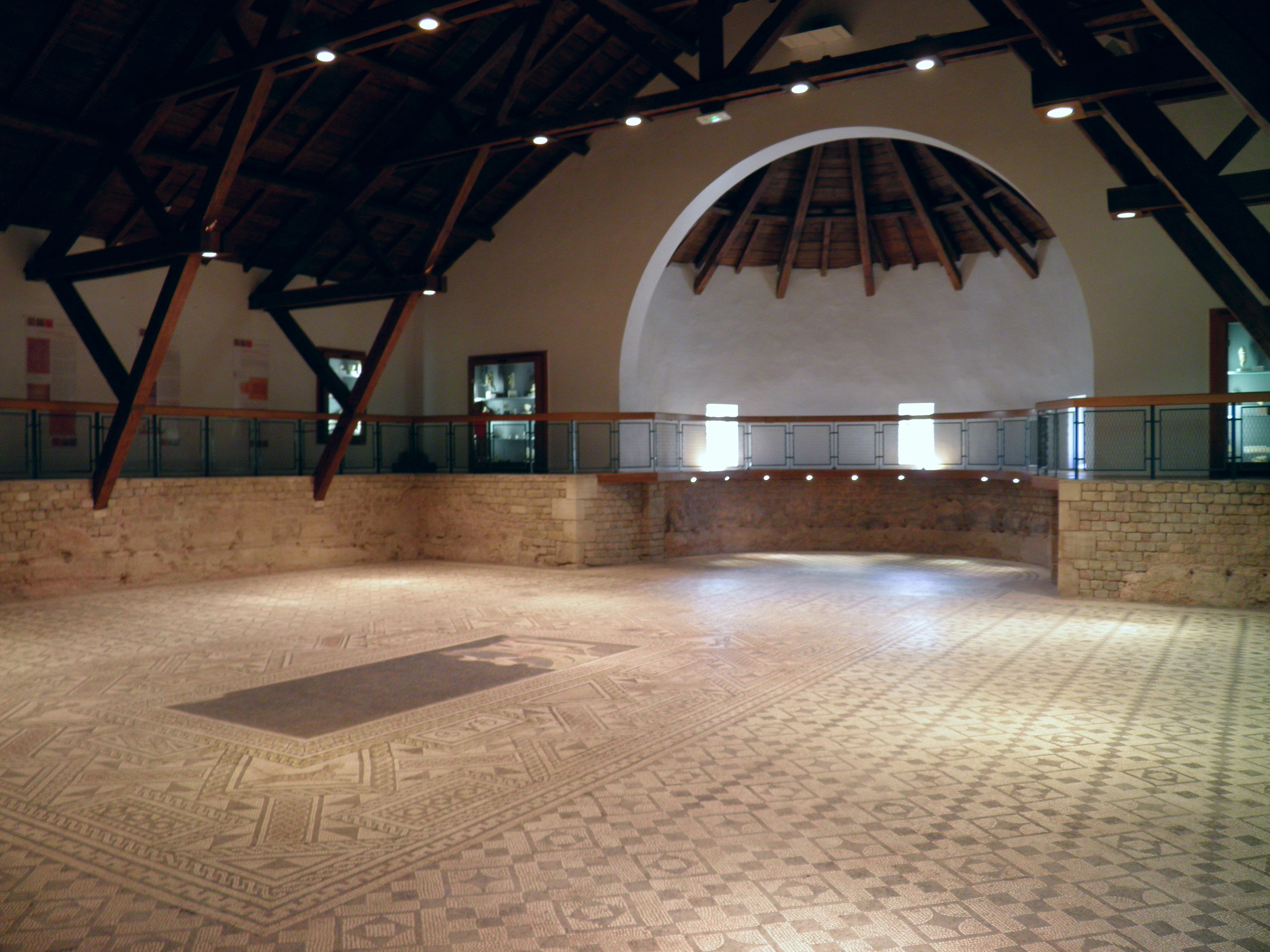
The "basilic" and its mosaic.
