= Grand, Vosges =

Grand
- Commune
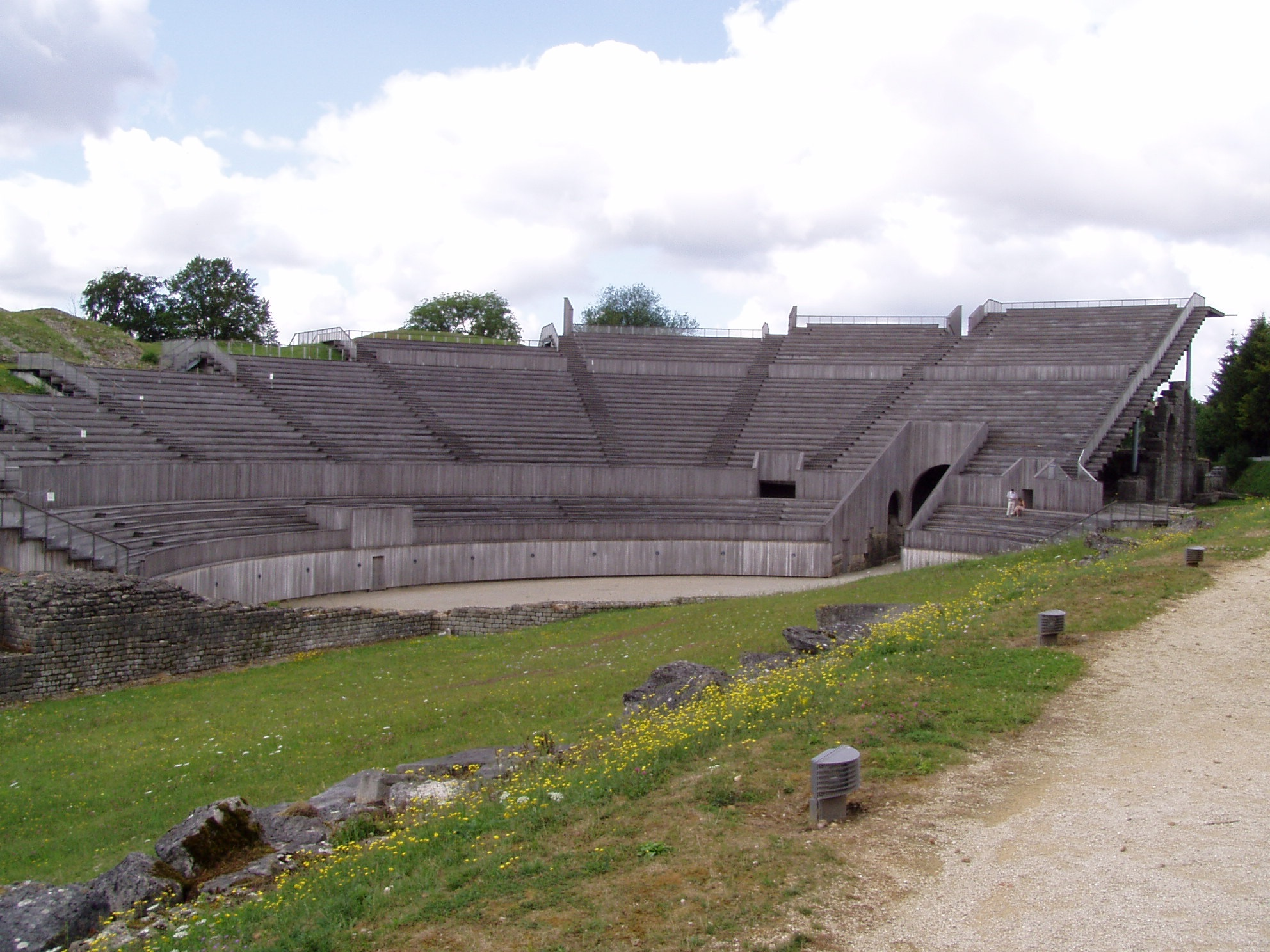
- Amphitheater
- Location of Grand
- Location within France Location within Grand Est
- Coordinates: 48°23′10″N 5°29′12″E
- Country: France
- Region: Grand Est
- Department: Vosges
- Arrondissement: Neufchâteau
- Canton: Neufchâteau
- Intercommunality: CC l'Ouest Vosgien

Government
  - Mayor (2020–2026): Didier Poilpre
- Area^{1}: 36.59 km^{2} (14.13 sq mi)
- Elevation: 370 m (1,210 ft)
- Highest elevation: 443 m (1,453 ft)
- Lowest elevation: 331 m (1,086 ft)
- Population (2023): 372
  - Density: 10.2/km^{2} (26.3/sq mi)
- Time zone: UTC+01:00 (CET)
  - Summer (DST): UTC+02:00 (CEST)
- INSEE/Postal code: 88212 /88350
- ^{1} French Land Register data, which excludes lakes, ponds, glaciers > 1 km^{2} (0.386 sq mi or 247 acres) and river estuaries.

Grand (French pronunciation: [ɡʁɑ̃]) is a commune in the Vosges department in Grand Est in northeastern France.

Grand is known for its Roman amphitheatre, mosaics, and aqueduct at the Archaeological site of Grand. It was the site of the coronation of Holy Roman Emperor Charles the Fat in 885.

== See also ==
- Communes of the Vosges department
