= Orléanais Historical and Archaeological Museum =

Coordinates: 47.9010°N 1.9048°E

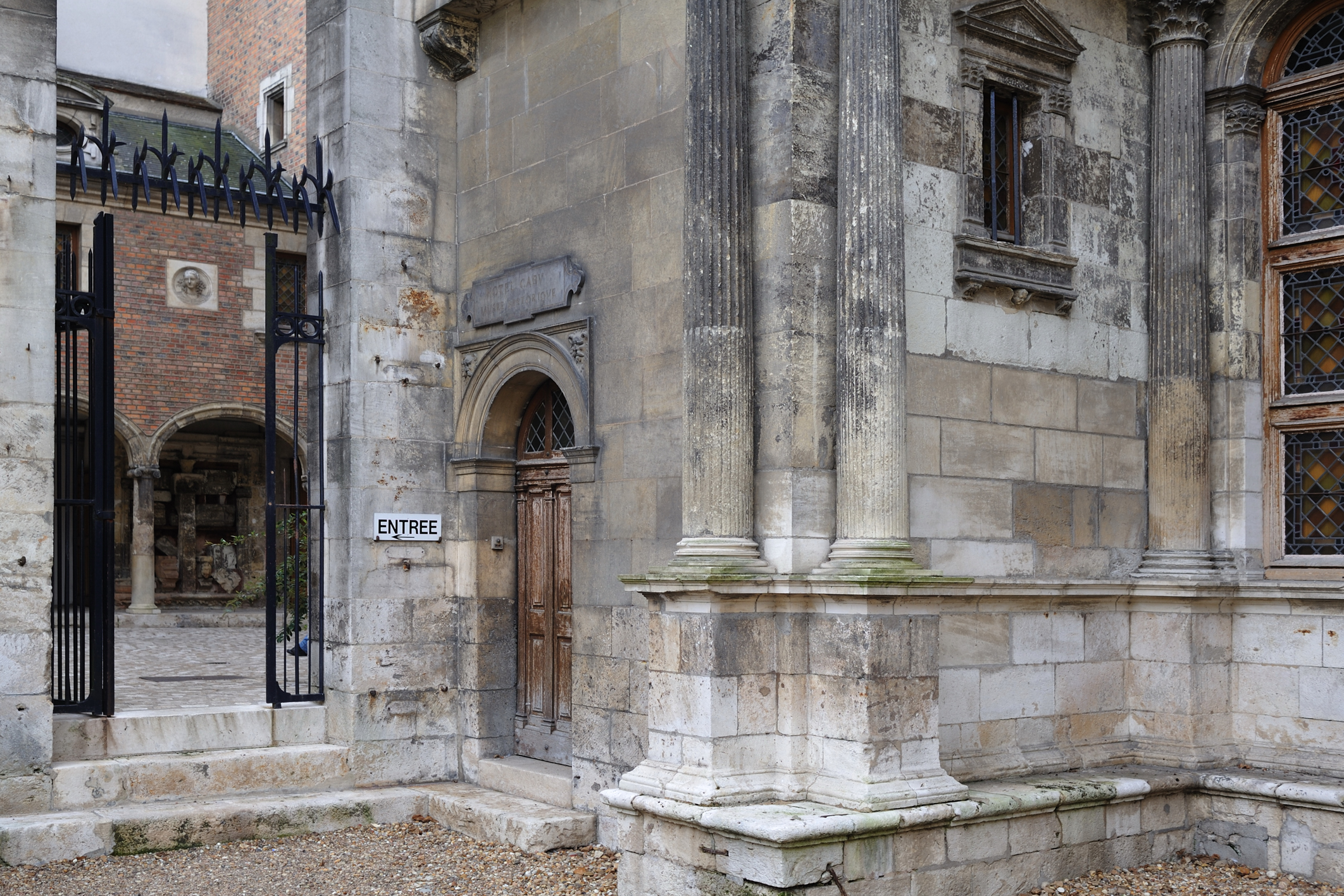

The Orléanais Historical and Archaeological Museum (French - Hôtel Cabu - Musée d'Histoire et d'Archéologie) is a local history museum at 22 rue de Charles Sanglier in Orléans. It was founded in 1823 by André Gaspard Parfait, count of Bizemont-Prunelé and assistant mayor of Orléans and includes the Neuvy-en-Sullias Hoard, a collection of medieval objects and other objects on the history of the city and area. It is a Museum of France.

== History ==
It first opened to the public in 1825, initially housed in the hôtel des Créneaux (now an annexe to the municipal music conservatoire). It was named the 'musée historique' in 1855 and in 1862 moved to its present home, sometimes known as the 'house of Diane de Poitiers'.

Most of its collections were destroyed by a fire caused by German bombing in June 1940. It was only restored in the 1960s, with the collections that had been moved out before the bombing moved back in. It reopened to the public in 1966.

== Collections ==
Its three main holdings are:

- The Neuvy-en-Sullias Hoard, a collection of bronze statues from the Gallic and Gallo-Roman periods
- Medieval and Renaissance architecture - a group of architectural fragments from buildings in the region, such as the capitals from Fleury Abbey and stucco work from Carolingian oratory at Germigny-des-Prés
- History of Orléans and the Loire valley - including the navigable portions of the river Loire and Joan of Arc (including the 'échevins' portrait of her)

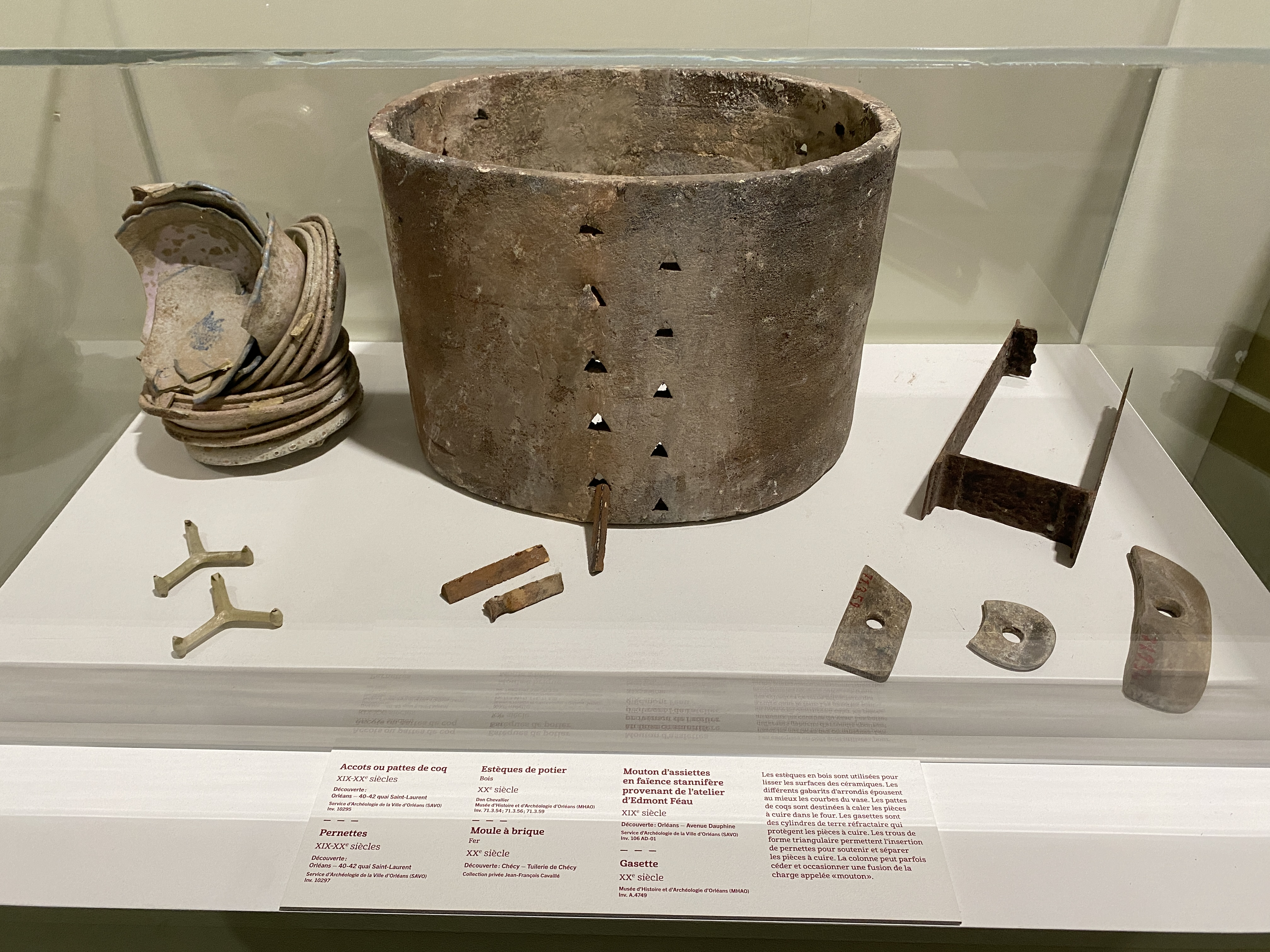
Discoveries in the region

== External links (in French) ==
- Official page on the mairie d'Orléans site
- Official site for the Société archéologique et historique de l'Orléanais
