= Chaumousey =

- Commune
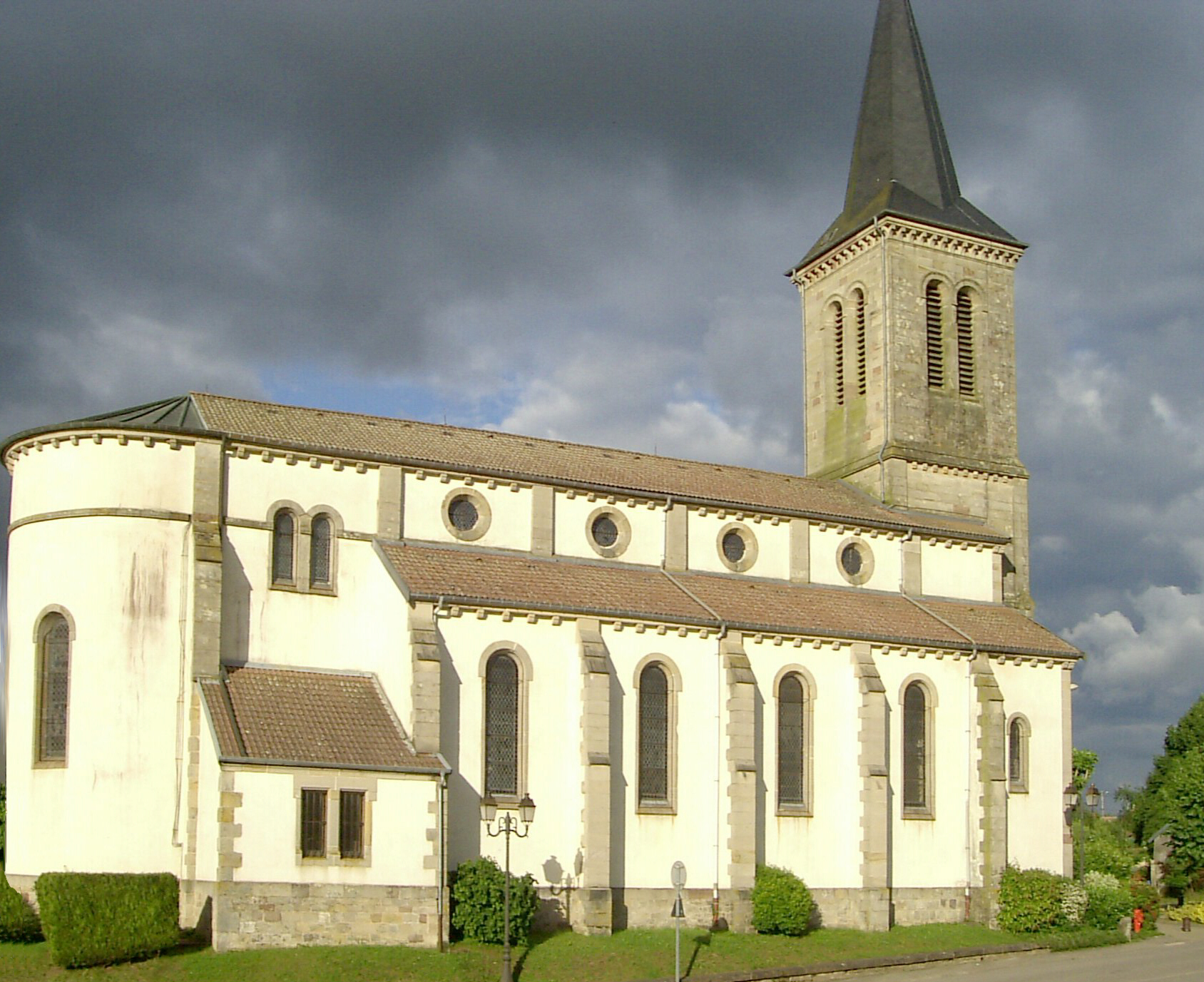
- Church of the Nativity Notre-Dame
- Location of Chaumousey
- Location within France Location within Grand Est
- Coordinates: 48°10′28″N 6°20′11″E
- Country: France
- Region: Grand Est
- Department: Vosges
- Arrondissement: Épinal
- Canton: Épinal-1
- Intercommunality: CA Épinal

Government
  - Mayor (2020–2026): Olivier Baraban
- Area^{1}: 8.71 km^{2} (3.36 sq mi)
- Elevation: 357 m (1,171 ft)
- Highest elevation: 419 m (1,375 ft)
- Lowest elevation: 338 m (1,109 ft)
- Population (2023): 924
  - Density: 106/km^{2} (275/sq mi)
- Time zone: UTC+01:00 (CET)
  - Summer (DST): UTC+02:00 (CEST)
- INSEE/Postal code: 88098 /88390
- ^{1} French Land Register data, which excludes lakes, ponds, glaciers > 1 km^{2} (0.386 sq mi or 247 acres) and river estuaries.

Chaumousey (French pronunciation: [ʃomuzɛ]) is a commune in the Vosges department in Grand Est in northeastern France.

== See also ==
- Communes of the Vosges department
