= Château d'Épinal =

French castle

- Épinal, Vosges, France
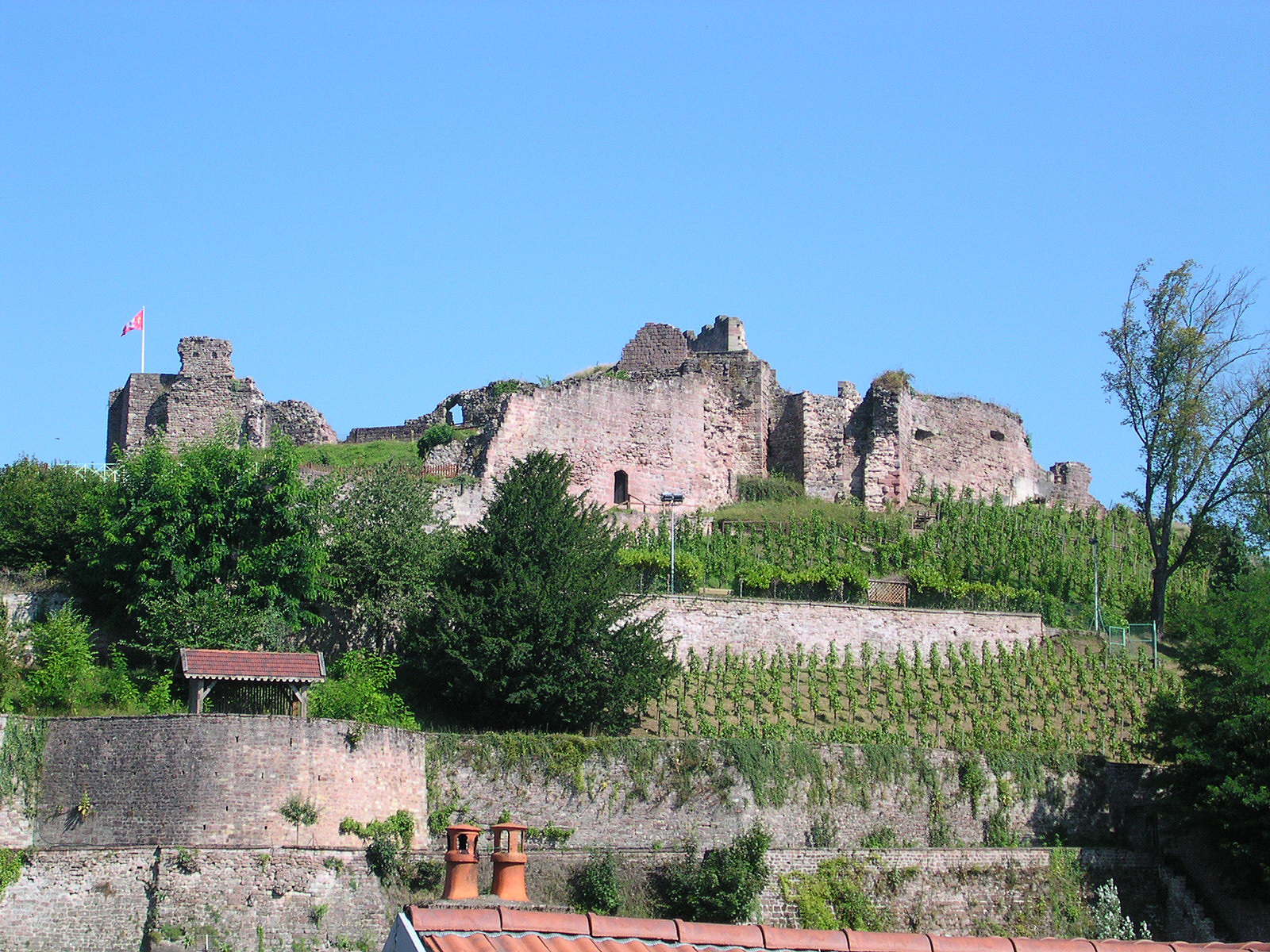

Site information
- Type: Fort
- Owner: Commune of Épinal

Location
- Coordinates: 48°10′31.08″N 6°27′20.16″E

The Château d'Épinal (French: Château d'Épinal) is a former castle located in the commune of Épinal, France at an elevation of 387 meters. The ruins is a protected monument since 1992.

The castle was originally built around the year 980 on the orders of Dietrich I of Metz, a cousin of the Holy Roman Emperor Otto I the Great. Around 1260, the castle was renovated on the orders of Duke Jacob of Lorraine. In 1356 the castle was damaged during the Basel earthquake, which was particularly notorious due to its severe impact on the Swiss city of Basel. In 1465 the castle, which had recently been reinforced with additional fortifications, was besieged by the Lorrainers. They captured the city and the castle a year later. In 1626 a renovation was carried out, and the castle was given a Baroque interior. In 1670 the castle and the city were captured by France, then ruled by King Louis XIV. After this destruction, the complex gradually fell into ruin. From 1740 to 1923 part of the building was used as a barracks. In 1809, a pagoda-like tower in imitation of Chinese style (tour chinoise) was built next to the ruins. In the 19th century, a park was created around the castle. Since 1975, systematic archaeological research, partial restoration, and conservation of the complex have been ongoing.
