= Gordian =

Gordian may refer to:

- Gordian I (c.159–238), Roman emperor for one month with his son
- Gordian II (c.192–238), son of Gordian I, Roman emperor for one month
- Gordian III (225–244), grandson of Gordian I, Roman emperor from 238 to 244
- Saint Gordianus (disambiguation)
- Gordian Fulde (born 1948), Australian medical doctor
- Gordian Knot, legend of Gordion associated with Alexander the Great
- Gordian worms, a common name for Nematomorpha, a phylum of parasitic worms
- Gordianus the Finder, fictional protagonist of Steven Saylor's mystery novels Roma Sub Rosa
- Gordian, antagonist in Quiz & Dragons: Capcom Quiz Game
- Gordian Warrior, Japanese anime television series, 1979–1981

== See also ==
- Gordian Knot (disambiguation)
