= Gordian Knot (disambiguation) =

The Gordian Knot is a legendary knot that became a metaphor for an intractable problem solved by a bold stroke.

Gordian Knot may also refer to:

- Gordian Knot (band), an American progressive rock band
  - Gordian Knot (album), the debut album of Sean Malone's progressive rock project of the same name
- Gordian Knot motion, a motion in The Standard Code of Parliamentary Procedure to start over
- Gordian Knot Operation, a Portuguese military operation in its overseas province of Mozambique in 1970
- The Gordian Knot (film), a 1911 silent film romantic comedy

== See also ==
- Gordian's Knot, a mechanical puzzle from Thinkfun toys included on the Games 100
