= Zbyněk Zbyslav Stránský =

Zbyněk Zbyslav Stránský (26 October 1926 – 21 January 2016) was a Czech museologist, considered the “father of scientific museology”. Between the years 1960 and 1970, he was responsible for one of the first attempts to structure a theoretical basis for museology, when directing the Department of Museology of the Moravian Museum, in Brno. With the support of the museum director, Jan Jelínek, he founded a School of museological thinking in Brno, aiming to connect museum practice to a specific theoretical system. Zbyněk Z. Stránský, as he used to sign his texts, was the pioneer in the construction of a museology that is conceived as social science, creating an autonomous system of thought based on specific concepts.

== Biography ==
Born in Kutná Hora, the old Czechoslovakia, on 26 October 1926, Zbyněk Z. Stránský studied history and philosophy at Charles University, in Prague, from 1946 to 1950. During the 1950s, he worked in several Czech museums and in 1962 he was appointed the head of the innovative Department of Museology of the Moravian Museum and the J. E. Purkyně University, in Brno, in which he has established, under the influence of Jan Jelínek (1926-2004), the museum director, the first teaching school of museology devoted to museological theory in the world. Already in the 1960s and 1970s, Stránský was considered the leading person of the Central-European museological school.

=== Role in the international community ===
Between 1980 and 1990, Stránský was an active participant of the International Committee for Museology-ICOFOM, of the International Council of Museums-ICOM, being in charge, from 1985, of the terminological project that aimed to create a Treaty of Museology and a Dictionarium Museologicum. Until the beginning of the 1990s, ICOFOM has expressed its mission to “establish museology as a scientific discipline”. Stránský has continually influenced this committee and participated in several of its meetings, becoming an elected member of its executive board in 1986.

=== The training in museology and the "Brno school" ===
Throughout his whole career, Zbyněk Z. Stránský worked to establish a complete and coherent training in museology, aiming to secure a place for museologists as thinkers and researchers. In 1962, a few professionals from the Moravian Museum created the Department of Museology, institutionally connected both to the museum and to J. E. Purkyně University, establishing a line of museological training that was going to be characterized as the “Brno School”. The craved transformation envisaged “making a real profession of museum work”.

On 20 June 1968, the students of the first class of museology received their university diplomas in Brno. As reported by Stránský, most of them were museum directors or professionals who already had a degree in another disciplinary field. The museology course had the duration of two years, with four sessions composed of one hundred lessons each, including theoretical courses and practical lessons. The themes of the classes were divided between general museology and special museology.

In the year of 1986, his training program in museology, in Brno, would gain an increasing number of new followers from every part of the world, with the creation of his International Summer School of Museology – ISSOM. Inside the structure of the so-called Masaryk University and with the support of UNESCO, the ISSOM lasted until the year 1999, disseminating the theoretical knowledge of Museology. In 1998, Stránský leaves the city of Brno to live in Banská Bystrica, a city of Slovakia, where he has created the Department of Ecomuseology, which he would coordinate.

Stránský continued to teach museology at the University of Matej Bel, in Banská Bystrica, until the year 2002. In the following years, he returned to Brno as an invited lecturer. Stránský continued to publish texts on the Theory of Museology, trying to reaffirm and adapt his structured system for this science until the first decade of this century. He died in Banská Bystrica, on the 21 January 2016.

== Points of view on Museology ==
Museology, a term that acquired different connotations throughout the 20th century and even before, thanks to the attempt to obtain academic legitimacy by some Czech museum professionals, it would gain a new dimension, from the 1960s, either as a science or as an autonomous disciplinary field, providing the necessary bases for museum work.

In his structural theory, Stránský was committed to the investigation of essential points considered by him as indispensable for the constitution of a scientific discipline:

1. first, a science must have defined a specific subject of study;
2. then, a science must use its own set of methods;
3. a science must have a specific terminology, a language;
4. and, at last, it must be based on a theoretical system.

The search for scientific legitimation, thus, should be followed by the concomitant construction of a theoretical system of museology accordingly to the framework of contemporary sciences.

=== Metamuseology ===
In the context of the 1960s, Stránský has appointed that there were objective reasons for the “birth of museology as a science”, however, its internal prerequisite, i.e., the logical structure, was inexistent. His question on the character of museology, then, made him think on the theoretical base of the very theory. In other words, Stránský has built a metatheoretical problematic as the starting point for structuring the scientific discipline, introducing the notion of metamuseology. The term designates “the theory whose subject is museology in itself”, in a certain way being strictly bound to museology, but also related to philosophy, to history and to the theory of science and culture.

In his metamuseological approach, the first problem raised concerned museology's subject of study. Stránský proposed some disconcerting questions for the field under development. With his initial declaration, in which he denies the museum as the scientific subject, the author opens the way towards a long process of self-reflection that marked museology in its bases in Eastern Europe.

By stating that the “subject of museology is not and cannot be the museum”, Stránský intended to separate the “instrument” – or the means, i.e., the museum – and the “end” to which it serves. He alleges, in effect, what could have been considered obvious in the context of post-war museums, which is the fact that the museum, as an institution that serves to a certain end, could not be the study subject of a science. Nevertheless, and in a tautological approach, according to some of his critics, he would propose that museology's subject of study should be searched in the very museum work, in the “systematic and critical” task of producing the museum object or musealia, in Stranskian terminology.

=== Museality ===
This thinker was, then, responsible for the dislocation of museology's subject from the museum, as a historic institution, to museality – understood as a “specific documentary value”. This last concept, central to his theory, would lead Stránský to conceive the cognitive intention of museology as the scientific interpretation of an “attitude of man to reality”. In his opinion, this seizing of the museum character of things, which he called “museality”, must be “in the center of the gnoseological intention of museology” as this discipline's scientific task, delimiting its position within the system of sciences.

Hence, the concept of museality (“muzealita”), understood as the “quality” or “value” of musealia, appeared in Stránský's works in 1970, being proposed as museology's true subject of study. The first attempts to define the term, however, have presented logical problems.

The museologist from German Democratic Republic, Klaus Schreiner, for instance, hasn't conceived museality as the property of an object as such but as something that is attributed to the object only in the context of a particular, specialized discipline. According to Schreiner, there cannot be a value “in itself” and the concept of museality in the Stranskian sense is the product of a “bourgeois-imperialist axiology”. He considers that the philosophical value propagated is “timeless, classless and generally not human” and that, as such, it “absolutizes the bourgeois class interests”. As noted by Peter Van Mensch, Stránský would modify the concept of museality over the years, changing its sense from a value category to the “specific value orientation” itself.

== Influences ==
There can be appointed several influences to the work of Zbyněk Z. Stránský. However, not all of them can be attested with direct citation in his texts. Some authors will suppose, for instance, that the knowledge of studies by the Belgian Paul Otlet on Bibliology would have influenced Stranskian thinking on scientific museology. In his theoretical texts, it is possible to note, among the most quoted authors, the Czechs Jiři Neustupný and Josef Beneš, as well as the Russian Awraam M. Razgon. It must be acknowledged, still, the fundamental support of the Czechs Jan Jelínek and Vinoš Sofka who have contributed to the dialogues established between Stránský and the international context of museology through his insertion in ICOFOM and the creation of ISSOM.

== Influenced authors ==
The referencial thinking of Stránský for Central and Eastern Europe would be cited in publications mainly since the 1970s, by authors such as the Russian A. M. Razgon, the British Geoffrey D. Lewis, the German, from the GDR, Klaus Schreiner, the Czech Anna Gregorová, the Brazilian Waldisa Rússio, and the Dutch Peter van Mensch, among others.

In the years 1990, several museology authors, from the connection with Stránský and his works in ICOFOM and ISSOM, would take his own interpretations from the reflections he initiated assimilating their own ideas to the thinking in their respective countries; this would be the case, for instance, of Bernard Deloche, in France, and Tereza Scheiner, in Brazil.

In general, even if some Anglo-Saxon museologists try to reduce the discipline to a set of techniques, those from the countries located in the ancient Eastern Europe, such as Anna Gregorová and Klaus Schreiner, define it as a science under construction. In effect, the first critics to this conception are Kenneth Hudson (UK) and George E. Burcaw (United States), so that the more theoretical approach to museology, from Stránský, was followed by authors in countries with a bigger tendency to theorization: the German and Latin schools, as well as Latin America.

Authors such as the Dutch Peter van Mensch proposed to structure the discipline based on the model initiated by Stránský. He understood museology according to five aspects: general museology, theoretical museology (or matamuseology, for Stránský), special museology, historic museology and applied museology. To these five aspects Stránský would propose to include social museology, to study the phenomenon of musealization in current societies. Furthermore, Peter van Mensch would amplify his reflection on the professionalization of museology. He proposes the PRC model (Preservation, Research and Communication), based on the recognition of the discipline as a true science.

=== The influence in ICOFOM LAM ===
According to the de spirit of the Declaration of Santiago of Chile (1972), and with the goal to decentralize the action of the International Committee for Museology, it is created in 1986, the Regional Subcommittee of ICOFOM for Latin America and the Caribbean – ICOFOM LAM, conceived by Nelly Decarolis (Argentina) and Tereza Scheiner (Brazil). The scientific profile of the field and the theoretical reflections would be reaffirmed, considered as central matters for the Region. However, Tereza Scheiner and Luciana Menezes de Carvalho (Brazil) pointed out that, differentiating itself from Stránský, “museology has the character of a theory, but not of a science”.

Particularly in the context of Brazil, the theoretical perspective developed by Stránský was introduced in the country in the 1980s, mainly in the works of Waldisa Rússio (in São Paulo) and Tereza Scheiner (in Rio de Janeiro), both responsible for the creation of “schools” based on this author's thinking and marked by the configuration of museology as a science.

=== Recognition by the field ===
In 1993, with the work "De museologica" (manuscript), Stránský received the title of associate professor (in Czech, docent).

In 1996, getting the title of regular professor, he rejected it with the justification that museology is not an official credential Science.

In 2006, Stránský was given the Silver medal of Masaryk University from the hands of the rector Petr Fiala.

In Brazil, with the support of ICOFOM, an homage for Stránský was organized by the Universidade Federal do Estado do Rio de Janeiro – UNIRIO, in the III Debates Cicle of the Museology School, organized in October, 2015, in celebration of the 50th anniversary of Stránský's declaration on museology's study subject, in 1965.

In 2015, the Regional Subcommittee of ICOFOM to Latin America and the Caribbean – ICOFOM LAM has dedicated the year for the work of Stránský and his influence in the Region, in the occasion of the XXIII Annual Meeting of ICOFOM LAM, in Panama City.

After his death, in 2016, the Czech journal Museologica Brunensia is organizing a special issue dedicated to Zbyněk Z. Stránský.

=== Main works ===
Stránský, Zbyněk Z. Predmet muzeologie. In: _____. (ed.). Sborník materiálu prvého muzeologického symposia. Brno: Museu da Morávia, 1965. pp. 30–33.

_____. The first museology graduates in Brno. ICOM – International Council of Museums, ICOM News / Nouvelles de l’ICOM, vol. 22, n. 2, June 1969, pp. 61–62.

_____. Múzejnictvo v relácii teórie a praxe. Múzeum, 1970, roč. XV., č. 3, pp. 173–183.

_____. Brno: Education in Museology. Museological Papers V, Supplementum 2. Brno: J. E. Purkyně University and Moravian Museum, 1974. 47p.

_____. (sob o pseudônimo E. Schneider). La voie du musée, exposition au Musée de Morave, Brno. Museum, vol. XXXIX, n°4, 1977, p. 183-191.

_____. Museological principles of museum exhibitions. The Problems of Contents, Didactics and Aesthetics of Modern Museum Exhibitions. International Museological Seminary, 1978, p. 71-93.

_____. Museology as a Science (a Thesis), Museologia, n.15, XI, 1980a, pp. 33–39.

_____. In: SOFKA, Vinos (org.). MUWOP: Museological Working Papers/DOTRAM: Documents de Travail en Muséologie. Stockholm: ICOM, International Committee for Museology/ICOFOM; Museum of National Antiquities, v. 1, 1980b. pp. 42–44. Disponível em: http://network.icom.museum/icofom/publications/our-publications/.

____. In: SOFKA, Vinos (org.). MUWOP: Museological Working Papers/DOTRAM: Documents de Travail en Muséologie. Stockholm: ICOM, International Committee for Museology/ICOFOM; Museum of National Antiquities, v. 2, 1981, pp. 19–22 et pp. 72–76. Disponível em: http://network.icom.museum/icofom/publications/our-publications/.

_____. Dictionarium museologicum und unsere Teilnahme, Muzeum, vol. 29, n°3, 1984, pp. 11–17.

_____. Working Group on the Treatise on Museology – aims and orientation. Museological News, Semi-Annual Bulletin of the International Committee of ICOM for Museology, n. 8, Stockholm, September, 1985a, pp. 25–28.

_____. Working Group on terminology. Museological News, Semi-Annual Bulletin of the International Committee of ICOM for Museology, n. 8, Stockholm, September, 1985b, pp. 29–31.

_____. Introduction à l’étude de la muséologie. Destinée aux étudiants de l’École Internationale d’Été de Muséologie – EIEM. Brno : Université Masaryk, 1995. 116p.

_____. Archeologie a muzeologie. Brno: Masarykova Univerzita, 2005.

Texts published in ICOFOM Study Series (available at <http://network.icom.museum/icofom/publications/our-publications/>):

Stránský, Zbyněk Z. A provocative check list, in Collecting Today for Tomorrow. ISS 6, 1984, p. 7–11.

_____. Comment, in Museology and Developing Countries. ISS 15, 1988, p. 237–240.

_____. Commentaire, in Muséologie et pays en voie de développement. ISS 15, 1988, p. 241–244.

_____. Comments and views on basic papers presented in ISS No. 8: Originals and Substitutes in Museums. ISS 9, 1985, p. 61–63.

_____. Current acquisition policy and its appropriateness for tomorrow's needs. ISS 6, 1984, p. 145–151.

_____. Forecasting – a museological tool? Museology and futurology. ISS 16, 1989, p. 297–301.

_____. Is museology a sequel of the existence of museums or did it precede their arrival and must museology thus programme their future? ISS 12, 1987, p. 287–292.

_____. La muséologie – science ou seulement travail pratique du musée ? DoTraM 1, 1980, p. 42–44.

_____. La muséologie est-elle une conséquence de l’existence des musées ou les précède-t-elle et détermine leur avenir ? ISS 12, 1987, p. 293–298.

_____. La muséologie et l’identité : commentaires et points de vue. ISS 11, 1986, p. 55–60.

_____. La prospective – un outil muséologique ? Muséologie et futurologie. ISS 16, 1989, p. 303–308.

_____. La théorie des systèmes et la muséologie. MuWoP 2, 1981, p. 72–76.

_____. Methodology of museology and professional training. ISS 1, 1983, p. 126–132.

_____. Methodology of museology and training of personnel – Comments. ISS 3, 1983, p. 14–22.

_____. Museologie : deus ex-machina. ISS 15, 1988, p. 215–223.

_____. Museology and identity: comments and views. ISS 11, 1986, p. 49–53.

_____. Museology deus ex-machina. ISS 15, 1988, p. 207–214.

_____. Museum – Territory – Society – Comments. ISS 3, 1983, p. 28–31.

_____. Museum – Territory – Society. ISS 2, 1983, p. 27–33.

_____. Object - document, or do we know what we are actually collecting? ISS 23, 1994, p. 47–51.

_____. Originals versus substitutes. ISS 9, 1985, p. 95–102.

_____. Originaux contre substitutes. ISS 9, 1985, p. 103–113.

_____. Originaux et substituts dans les musées. Commentaires et points de vue sur les mémoires de base présentés dans l’ISS N° 8. ISS 9, 1985, p. 65–68.

_____. Politique courante d’acquisition et adaptation aux besoins de demain. ISS 6, 1984, p. 152–160.

_____. The Department of Museology, Faculty of Arts, Masaryk University of Brno and the questions of defining a profile of the museology curriculum. ISS 22, 1993, p. 127–131.

_____. The language of exhibitions. ISS 19, 1991, p. 129–133.

_____. The ontology of memory and museology. ISS 27, 1997, p. 269–272.

_____. Une check-list provocatrice, in Collectionner aujourd’hui pour demain. ISS 6, 1984, p. 12–14.
