= Jean-François Leroux-Dhuys =

French writer and historian (1934–2021)

- Born: 13 October 1934; Lille, France
- Died: 22 February 2021 (aged 86)
- Occupations: Writer; Historian

Jean-François Leroux-Dhuys (13 October 1934 – 22 February 2021) was a French writer and historian.

== Biography ==
After he earned a degree in geography from Sciences Po in 1957, Leroux-Dhuys worked for Les Nouvelles littéraires for ten years. He co-founded an association to help preserve Clairvaux Abbey, as well as the Charte européenne des abbayes et sites cisterciens. A friend of Georges Henri Rivière, he became curator of Musée du Cristal de Bayel, which he founded in 1994. He was elected into the Association internationale des critiques d’art in 1975 and the Académie d’Architecture in 1990. He served as a law professor at Sciences Po from 1980 to 1996.

In addition to his career in the field of history, Leroux-Dhuys served as Mayor of Bar-sur-Aube from 2001 to 2008 as a part of the Miscellaneous left.

Jean-François Leroux-Dhuys died on 22 February 2021 at the age of 86.

== Distinctions ==
- Knight of the Legion of Honour
- Knight of the Ordre des Palmes académiques
- Knight of the Ordre des Arts et des Lettres

== Works ==
=== Books ===
- Les problèmes fonciers (1967)
- Les Promoteurs (1975)
- L’architecture selon Émile Aillaud (1983)
- Les abbayes cisterciennes (1998)
- Clairvaux, le génie d’un lieu (2012)

=== Books in Collaboration ===
- Pour une civilisation de l’Habitat with Louis Houdeville (1969)
- Françoise Debert with Jean-Loup Trassart (1975)
- Le Pessac d’Emile Aillaud, c’est Creutzwald en Lorraine. Pessac II, le Corbusier 1969-1985 (1985)
- Musées et collections publiques (1990)
- L’abbaye de Clairvaux (2003)
- Pierre Sansot – Entretiens avec Jean-François Dhuys (2008)
- Clairvaux - État des lieux (2011)

=== Texts in Collective Works ===
- Georges Henri Rivière, un homme dans le siècle (1989)
- Témoignage. Deslandes par Deslandes (1989)
- Clairvaux - prison de 1808 à nos jours, Histoire de Clairvaux, Actes du Colloque de Clairvaux – juin 1990 (1991)
- Clairvaux, de l’Abbaye à la prison. Moines et religieux au Moyen-Age (1994)
- Bar-sur-Aube/Clairvaux /Colombé-le-Sec. Champagne Ardenne (1995)
- Les moines cisterciens, bâtisseurs de la cité céleste. Les bâtisseurs, des moines cisterciens aux capitaines d’industrie (1997)
- La fondation de l’Ordre de Citeaux, 21 mars 1098. Célébrations nationales 1998 (1998)
- Les moines cisterciens, bâtisseurs de la Cité céleste. Mémoire de Champagne, tome I (2000)
- L’économie cistercienne, les convers et les granges, l’exemple de Clairvaux. Mémoire de Champagne, tome II (2000)
- La maitrise d’ouvrage, une fonction de tous les temps. Les bâtisseurs de la modernité (2000)
- Georges Henri Rivière et le Musée des Arts et Traditions populaires. Les bâtisseurs de la modernité (2000)
- Les cisterciens et la vigne, l’exemple de Clairvaux. Mémoire de Champagne, tome III (2001)
- La maitrise d’ouvrage, deux ou trois choses que je sais d’elle. Les bâtisseurs du présent (2003)
- La diffusion actuelle de la culture cistercienne dans les institutions touristiques et culturelles laïques, l’exemple de la charte Mélanges cisterciens 2012 (2012)

=== Articles ===
- Salariat et marché commun (1958)
- Le problème foncier (1966)
- Le préalable foncier (1968)
- Réflexions sur la politique foncière de quelques pays européens (1968)
- Etude économique simplifiée d'une opération immobilière de caractéristiques moyennes à Paris (1971)
- Le projet de loi Guichard freinera-t-il la spéculation foncière ? (1974)
- L’évolution du coût des logements en location (1974)
- Peu d’espoir d’endiguer la spéculation foncière (1975)
- La petite réforme foncière de M. Galley (1975)
- Luttes urbaines bidons (1976)
- La poétique de la ville, un portrait de Pierre Sansot (1978)
- L’adaptation de la promotion immobilière à la nouvelle conjoncture de la construction du logement (1983)
- Un paradis perdu : la Sainterie de Vendeuvre (1984)
- Signification de Clairvaux (1986)
- Art cistercien, architecture cistercienne (2008)

=== Prefaces ===
- Ricardo Bofill, projets français 1978/81- La cité : histoire et technologie (1981)
- Chronique des années noires dans l’arrondissement de Bar-sur-Aube 1939-1945 (1989)
- Juin 1940 en Champagne méridionale (1990)
- Bar-sur-Aube et son histoire, le vieux pont d’Aube (1991)
- Sous la bouche des fours (1993)
- Abbayes cisterciennes (1996)
- Enfermements (2009)
- Côte des Bar, Champagne et Patrimoine (2011)
- Sites cisterciens d’Europe (2012)
- Les vierges du Salve de Chantal (2012)
