= International Committee for Museology =

- Abbreviation: ICOFOM
- Founded: 1977
- Founder: Jan Jelínek
- Type: NGO
- Official languages: English, French, Spanish
- Chair: Karen Brown
- Website: http://icofom.mini.icom.museum/

ICOFOM, the International Committee for Museology of the International Council of Museums (ICOM) was founded in 1977 at the initiative of Jan Jelínek, in order to promote research and theoretical thinking within the museum world. This committee became one of the most popular in International Council of Museums (ICOM). It addresses the study of the theoretical foundation that guides museum activities around the world or, more generally, the analysis of the different forms that museums can have. The committee includes several hundred museologists from all over the world, organizes yearly symposia and publishes, among other monographs, the annual journal ICOFOM Study Series, available online.

== Origins ==
The work of the International Council of Museums (ICOM), begun in 1946, was based on much older programmes, specifically professional symposia, journals of national associations (Museums Journal, Great Britain, 1902; Museumskunde, Germany, 1905), and of course the work of the International Office of Museums, founded in 1926 by the International Institute of Intellectual Cooperation, located in Paris. A large part of the research which grew out of these associations, as with international committees, focused on objectives relating to concrete professional concerns. In 1968 ICOM launched an international committee for the training of museum professionals (ICTOP) at a time when museum training courses were gaining popularity, in particular in Brno, Czechoslovakia (1963), Leicester, UK (1966) and Paris (1970). On the other hand, the development of specific theories linked to the museum phenomenon – long referred to as "museography", which became "museology" after WWII – was not a research interest for most museum professionals. Nevertheless, this field was particularly interesting for some researchers and university professors, in particular in Eastern European countries, first of all Jan Jelínek who was director of the Antropos Museum in Brno and president of ICOM. The International Committee for Museology was founded in 1977 at the General Conference of ICOM in Moscow. Its first president was Jan Jelínek (Vinoš Sofka succeeded him in 1981). Since that date we can say that three generations of museologists have continued to pursue the work of ICOFOM.

== Three generations of museologists ==
Museology was already developed in Eastern Europe at the time of the cold war. From the start ICOFOM would be a unique international platform that included researchers from both sides of the Iron Curtain, who were trying to set up museology as an autonomous discipline: without this independent status museology could not be taught in universities in Eastern countries, making this task a challenge of singular importance in the countries of the Warsaw Pact. The iconic personalities of museology, such as Georges Henri Rivière, and especially André Desvallées in France, worked at the same time as influential museologists in the Eastern bloc, among whom are Avram Razgon (URSS), Klaus Schreiner (DDR), Jiří Neustupný (Czechoslovakia), Josef Beneš (Czechoslovakia), Wojciech Gluzinski (Poland), and especially Zbyněk Stránský (Czechoslovakia). The stated aim of ICOFOM, under the dynamic leadership of Vinoš Sofka (Sweden), was to make an inventory of the different trends in museology throughout the world, and to develop this discipline in order to endow it with the status of science within the academic structure. At the beginning this essentially theoretical approach disconcerted many museum researchers who were much more pragmatic, for example George Ellis Burcaw, author of an influential manual on museum work in the United States. Additionally, the climate of the cold war, which was still going on, did not help in creating closer links between the two sides. On the other hand, many researchers from Latin countries, in particular Waldisia Russio (Brazil), are especially attracted to this approach.

Much enlarged new definitions of museology emerged, whose object of study reaches beyond the museum itself. The museum institution per se, the concept of museum as opposed to the specific museum, such as the Prado, is relatively recent, and what interests museologists is a specific attitude which led to the creation of museums, as well as cabinets of curiosity, or in the future new forms linked to digital technologies (Virtual museums): As already defined by the Czech museologist Anna Gregorová in 1980 "Museology is a science studying the specific relation of man to reality, consisting in purposeful and systematic collecting and conservation of selected inanimate material, mobile, and mainly three-dimensional objects documenting the development of nature and society" and "the museum is an institution which applies and carries out the specific relation of man to reality". From this point of view, which allowed for better describing the particular activity of selecting and describing an object in a museum – a phenomenon not too far from a sacred act – more specific concepts were developed, such as musealisation, a term used more in French and Spanish than in English, (the act of introducing an object into a museum context), and museality (the special value of the object which determines its musealisation). Zbyněk Stránský, the Czech museologist, was of major importance in this development, through his involvement in ICOFOM and also through the International Summer School of Museology, which he founded in Brno in 1987.

Following this first generation of ICOFOM researchers, under the eight year presidency of Vinoš Sofka, came a second, more diverse group of researchers. A leading member of this generation was Peter van Mensch (Netherlands), author of a 1992 doctoral thesis on museology as a scientific discipline: Towards a Methodology of Museology, who followed Sofka as President of ICOFOM. Other outstanding museologists in this generation were Ivo Maroévić (Croatia), Bernard Deloche and Mathilde Bellaigue (France), Martin Schaerer (Switzerland), as well as Teresa Scheiner (Brazil), Tomislav Šola (Croatia) and Nelly Decarolis (Argentina). Alpha Oumar Konaré, (Mali), who was particularly attentive to the development of new museology, had a remarkable career: he was elected President of ICOM in 1989, but did not renew his mandate when he became President of Mali in 1992.

Broader definitions of the museum phenomenon began at this time, in particular one by Judith Spielbauer: “The established museum is a means to an end, not the end itself. These ends have been stated in many ways. They include varying perspectives on broadening an individual's perception of the interdependence of the social, aesthetic and natural worlds in which he lives by providing information and experience and fostering an understanding of self within this widening context. The increase and dissemination of knowledge, the improvement of the quality of life, and preservation for future generations are all included in the usual parades of rationales.” Other thinkers, such as Jennifer Harris and Kerstin Smeds, further expanded the definitions and added provocative nuances.

A third generation, schooled in museology by the second one, gradually joined the work of researchers: in particular one can note Wanchen Chang (Taiwan) and Bruno Brulon Soares (Brazil). They all share a global vision of museology founded on critical thinking about the development of museums in the world and on the values that form the conditions for museum work. For the past thirty years the museum has undergone considerable changes, whether becoming more market oriented which has been the case in many countries, museums' relationship to collections, which is endlessly altered, and of course digital technologies whose development has transformed our way of seeing the world. In the light of this evolution of the museum world, it is important to understand and to prepare for the possible evolution of the museum itself.

== Museology today and the work of ICOFOM ==
Today museology – as seen by ICOFOM – can be defined as "comprising all the efforts at theorization and critical thinking about the museum field". This vision, intentionally very broad, collects trends of thought that are often conflicting as they are linked to critical thinkers in different parts of the world, whether Benjamin Ives Gilman or Georges Brown Goode, John Cotton Dana or Joseph Veach Noble, and, more currently, Duncan F. Cameron, Neil Postman, Georges Henri Rivière, Zbyněk Stránský, André Desvallées, Stephen Weil or Roland Arpin. ICOFOM is harnessed to this work of research and synthesis, and strives to compile an inventory of the different ways to conceive of museums and museology and to generate, through these syntheses, the trends that emerge from the vast flux of change in the museum field. Within ICOFOM most working researchers teach at universities after having spent part of their career in a museum (or while continuing museum work at the same time). Presently there are about 700 members in the committee, of whom about 60% are from European countries and more than 20% live in Latin America.

ICOFOM is known for its expansion into parts of the world where museums are rapidly developing. In this regard, Nelly Decarolis and Tereza Scheiner started and sustained a subcommittee, ICOFOM LAM, or ICOFOM Latin America. The great success of this subcommittee prompted the formation of ICOFOM ASPAC, ICOFOM Asia and the South Pacific, under the strong leadership of Olga Truevtseva and Hildegard Vieregg. Regional subcommittees such as these provide important support and training for those interested in the work of ICOFOM but who cannot always get to annual meetings. in distant parts of the world.

Right from the start publications were a major part of ICOFOM activities. The first issues of Museological Working Papers, published in 1980 and 1981, were followed by ICOFOM Study Series (ISS) published annually, which comprise in all several thousand pages and are available on line at the ICOFOM site. In general, ISS publishes papers presented at the ICOFOM symposiums. In 2007, the ICOFOM editorial committee installed a double-blind peer review of papers submitted for publication.

ICOFOM has also published syntheses of museology: What is a museum?, the translation into English of the French monograph Vers une redéfiniton du musée, edited in the framework of discussions regarding a new definition of Museum by ICOM for its revised Statues in 2007. More recently, in 2010, ICOFOM edited Key Concepts of Museology, a summary that has been translated into 8 languages, of the major points of the Dictionnaire Encyclopédique de Muséologie published in 2011. This encyclopaedic dictionary of 722 pages, with thematic articles and amply illustrated, is the result of work begun in ICOFOM in 1993.

== List of ICOFOM Chairpersons ==
- Jan Jelinek, 1977–1981
- Vinoš Sofka, 1981–1989
- Peter van Mensch, 1989–1993
- Martin Schaerer, 1993–1998
- Tereza Scheiner, 1998–2001
- Hildegard Vieregg, 2001–2007
- Nelly Decarolis, 2007–2010
- Ann Davis, 2010–2013
- François Mairesse, 2013–2019
- Bruno Brulon Soares, 2019–2022
- Karen Elizabeth Brown, 2022-

André Desvallées is permanent advisor of ICOFOM and honorary member of ICOM
