= Hildegard Vieregg =

- Born: Hildegard Katharina Vieregg; Bad Aibling, Germany
- Occupation: Museologist

Hildegard Katharina Vieregg (born in 1939 in Bad Aibling, Germany) is a museologist and museum professional, an educator, a university professor and lecturer, author, editor and administrator. She has contributed in important way to museums, to the International Council of Museums and to its International Committee for Museology. Her research interests include memorial sites, resistance against the Nazi totalitarian regime and museology as a science.

== Biography ==
=== Education ===
After graduating from the classical gymnasium (Ignaz-Günther Gymnasium) in Rosenheim, she entered LMU Munich where she studied pedagogy, philosophy, psychology and social science, and in 1964, was awarded a teaching degree. Later, she returned to the same university and, in 1990, received a doctorate in comparative museology and museum policy as well as a doctor of philosophy degree in museum education and museum policy.

=== Employment ===
Vieregg has had a distinguished career. Starting in 1975, she worked at the Bayerische Staatsgemäldesammlungen in Munich, where she was promoted to the position of Vice Director of the Centre for Museum Education. From 1978 to 1999, she freelanced in various museums in Munich and at memorial sites in Bavaria, and also offered courses in interdisciplinary Studies of Contemporary History and Art at the Bavarian State Academy for Teacher Training and Personal Management Dillingen.

Simultaneously, from 1983 to 1986, Vieregg was responsible for the research program “Community Museums and Preservation of Historical Monuments” on behalf of the Federal Ministry for Science and Education, Bonn and Bavarian State Ministry for Culture and Education. She subsequently was appointed Professor of Museum Studies at the Barnaul State Pedagogical University and at the Munich School of Philosophy.

On behalf of the Bavarian Ministry of Culture and Science, she was responsible for the teacher training in memorial sites, giving workshops in Germany, Czech Republic and Poland, and, from 2001 to 2004, for special projects on museum history, museology and museum education. Simultaneously she has been a senior lecturer in museology summer schools in Brno, Czech Republic (1997–2006), and Kolyvan, Siberia/Russia, as well as giving international lectures in Argentina and[Brazil.

== Research interests ==
A specific field of research since 1983 has been youth-resistance against the totalitarian regime of National Socialism and Willi Graf as a member of the Munich students group White Rose. Vieregg was involved with the planning and research of the international exhibition: “Willi Graf and the White Rose – Student Resistance against National Socialism” as well as publishing the Graf letters.

From 1994 to 1997, she was the scientific adviser of the ‘White Rose Foundation’ in Munich. Vieregg always promoted Museology as a science in the broad museum-field. She examined the interrelationship among museums, world heritage sites and museums and memorial sites; this was particularly germain in contemporary history. She has published extensively on matters of world heritage and museum ethics. She does not shirk voluntary work, serving on the editorial board of the Journal MUZEUM – Museum and Regional Studies (Prague, Czech Republic) and of Vestnik of Altai Pedagogical University, Barnaul, Russia, and Pavlodar State Pedagogical Institute, Kazakhstan.

== International Council of Museums and International Committee for Museology ==
Vieregg has held important positions in both the International Council of Museums (ICOM) and its International Committee for Museology (ICOFOM). She was Secretary to the ICOFOM Board from 1998 to 2001, and President from 2001 to 2007.

During this time, she played an active role in the ICOM Working Groups Use of Languages (2001–2004) and Committee for Property and Legal Affairs (2001 - 2004). As President, she co-ordinated the annual meetings of ICOFOM from 2000 to 2007: Munich, Germany and Brno, Czech Republic (2000), Barcelona, Spain (2001), Cuenca, Ecuador and Galapagos Islands (2002), Krasnoyarsk and Barnaul, Siberia, Russia (2003), Seoul, South Korea (2004), Calgary, Canada (2005), Córdoba and Alta Gracia, Argentina (2006), Vienna, Austria (2007), while editing the ICOFOM Study Series (1998 to 2007) and the ICOFOM Newsletter (2001–2007).

Her particular focus was the promotion of international co-operation within ICOFOM and with the sub-Committee ICOFOM Latin America (ICOFOM LAM), chaired by Nelly Decarolis, Argentina. She has continued her active international participation with a subcommittee of ICOFOM, initially called ICOFOM Siberia and South-East Asia (SIB & SAP, 2003) and now renamed ICOFOM Asian and Pacific Countries (ASPAC).

In this regard, she was academic coordinator of the International annual meeting of ICOFOM Siberia and South-East Asia (SIB & SAP) in Taipei/Taiwan 2009, participated in the 2011 International Forum in Abakan, Siberia, organized a multi-disciplinary museology meeting involving Siberians and Germans in Munich, Germany in 2012, assumed the position of vice-chair of ICOFOM ASPAC from 2013 to the present, and coordinated ICOFOM ASPAC meetings Kasachstan, Mongolia and Russia in 2014, ICOFOM SIB Meeting in Barnaul and Zmeinogorsk/Russia in 2015 and ICOFOM ASPAC Meeting in Taipei and Taichung/Taiwan that same year.

== Major writings ==
- Willi Grafs Jugend im Nationalsozialismus im Spiegel von Briefen (“Willi Graf’s Youth in National Socialism – Individual Letters”) with Jos Schätzler, Munich, 1984.
- Resistance to National Socialism: Arbeiter, Christen, Jugendliche, Eliten (“Resistance to National Socialism: Workers, Christian People, Youth, Academic Elites”) with Hinrich Siefken, University of Nottingham/GB, 1993.
- Wächst Gras darüber? München: Hochburg des Nationalsozialismus und Zentrum des Widerstands. (“Munich, Center of National Socialism and Center of Resistance”) Munich, 1993.
- Resistance to National Socialism: Kunst und Widerstand (“Fine Arts and Resistance”) with Hinrich Siefken, University of Nottingham/GB, 1995.
- Museumswissenschaften. Eine Einführung (“Museum Sciences: An Introduction”). UTB Fink. Paderborn, 2006.
- Studienbuch Museumswissenschaften. Impulse zu einer internationalen Betrachtung. (“Studies to Museum Sciences: Inspirations to an International Consideration”). Schneider Verlag. Baltmannsweiler/Hohengehren, 2007.
- Geschichte des Museums. Eine Einführung (“History of the Museums: An Introduction”). Fink Verlag. Munich, 2008.
- "Theodor Haecker – Christliche Existenz im totalitären Staat" (“Theodor Haecker – Christian Character in a Totalitarian State”). In: Schwab, Rüdiger (Hg.): Eigensinn und Bindung. Katholische deutsche Intellektuelle im 20. Jahrhundert. Kevelaer 2009. S. 115–134.
- Museologia, with Olga Truevtseva. Barnaul/Russian Federation, 2010. (298 S.).
- “Approaches to the Transition Process From Oppression to Democracy. Case Studies from Memorials and Museums”, ICOM International, 2016, pp. 1 – 17.

== General notes ==
- Willi Graf und die Weisse Rose. Glaubenszeugnis gegen das NS-Regime. In: Prégardier, Elisabeth, Maier, Hans (Hg.): „Vater, wohin geht’s du?“ – Familienschicksale im Widerstand. Edition Mooshausen. Annweiler 2010. S. 44–54.
- Willi Grafs Jugend im Nationalsozialismus im Spiegel von Briefen (“Willi Graf’s Youth in National Socialism – Individual Letters”) with Jos Schätzler, Munich 1984.
- Museology – a Field of Knowledge (III): Museology, Universal Heritage and the Techniques, in: ICOM Deutschland Mitteilungen 200.8, Berlin 2008, p. 38
- Contemporary History in Relation to Memory, Museums and Memorial Sites Internationally – Past, Present and Future. In: COMPLUTUM. Universitas Complutensis Matritensis. Vol 26, No. 2. 2015. pp. . 89–99
- 5. Aspekte zur Verwirklichung ethischer Grundsätze im Museum. (Aspects to the Realization of Ethical Principles in Museums). MUZEUM/Praha/Czech Republic Nr. 1/2016, at press
- ISS 30 to 36 ICOFOM publications are available in the original form at the ICOM Information Centre in Paris, UNESCO Building, and online at http://network.icom.museum/icofom/publications/nos-publications/L/2/
- ICOFOM LAM – International Committee for Museology, Latin America: Museologie und das Kulturelle Erbe – Interpretation aus der Sicht Lateinamerikas. In: ICOM Deutschland, Mitteilungen 2006. S. 41–42.
- Vieregg, H.K., Chen, Kuo-Ning, Truevtseva, O.N. “The Committee of Museology of the Asian-Pacific Countries and its Activities. The Organization of International Cooperation in the Field of Preservation of Cultural Heritage, in Cultural Heritage in Asian Countries: from Theory to Practice, edited by О.N. Truevtseva & H. K. Vieregg. Pavlodar State Pedagogical Institute and Altai State Pedagogical University, 2015. p. 46-58, ill.
