= Waldisa Russio =

Waldisa Rússio Museologist
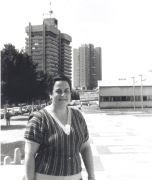
- Rússio, aged 55 in 1990
- Born: Waldisa Rússio Camargo Guarnieri; 6 September 1935; São Paulo, SP, Brazil
- Died: 5 November 1990 (aged 55)
- Occupations: Author, academic, Museologist

Waldisa Rússio Camargo Guarnieri (5 September 1935 – 11 June 1990), was a professor and museologist, most known in Brazil simply as Waldisa Rússio. She became one of the most influential personalities in the development of theoretical Museology and contributed to the constitution of the disciplinary field of Museology in Brazil. From 1957 she worked as a federal employee of the State of São Paulo in different positions and particularly in management reforms. In 1959, she graduated in the Law school of the Universidade de São Paulo – USP (University of São Paulo) and started working with the management of cultural matters of the State. On the 1970s, she was involved with issues more directly related to museums.

== Academic career ==
Devoted to the cultural knowledge related to museums, Rússio introduced these matters to the academic field with her master (1977) and PhD (1980) degrees at the Escola Pós-Graduada da Fundação Escola de Sociologia e Política de São Paulo – FESP (Post-Graduate School of the Foundation School of Sociology and Politics of São Paulo). Waldisa Rússio starts, then, to develop a specific contribution to the capacity building in Museology from her experiences as Technical Assistant for the Cultural Area in the Government of the State of São Paulo and of the assessment of these experiences in the academic level.

Between the decades of 1960s and 1970s, she has coordinated several projects for the implantation of state museums in the country. Rússio has had an exponent role in the constitution of the first post-graduate course in Museology in the national territory, which became active in 1978 at FESP. Motivated by the ICOM recommendations in the 1960s and 1970s, which predicted the specific training of professionals (“museologists”) in all levels, and, preferably, in the post-graduate level, Waldisa Rússio has created the first Course of Museology of the state in 1978, as a specialization course, attached to the School of Social Sciences of São Paulo at FESP. The Course of Museology benefited from the structure and pedagogy of that School, and particularly of its interdisciplinary method. Waldisa Rússio justified the course by affirming the importance to consider the fact that the study of museums and Museology demands an interdisciplinary character, which makes it only “viable and practicable in the post-graduate level, when students are already in the domain of another discipline in which they were ‘formed’”. Nevertheless, the course would stay active until 1992, without the constitution of a master degree in Museology, thanks to the reformulation of the internal structure of FESP, which would be organized in institutes and no longer prioritizing interdisciplinary approaches. This would leave Museology as defended by Rússio in the background.

== Professional background ==
Rússio coordinated the Technical Group of Museums in the Cabinet of the Secretary of State of Culture in São Paulo (1976); the Specialization Course in Museology at FESP (1978); she contributed to the creation of the Institute of Museology of São Paulo (1985) and in the development of museological projects such as, for example, in the Museu da Indústria, Comércio e Tecnologia (Museum of Industry, Commerce and Technology, 1980s) and in the Estação Ciência (Science Station, 1986-1988). Furthermore, she established several partnerships with the Brazilian Committee of the International Council of Museums – ICOM Brazil, to which she was affiliated in 1977. At the same time she became an active member of the International Committee for Museology – ICOFOM, created as a committee of ICOM in this same year. Waldisa Rússio became the first Brazilian museologist to publish theoretical texts in Museology that were broadly disseminated by this committee . Some months before her death, Rússio was involved in the organization of the “I Latin American Seminar of Museology”, conceived with the Institute of Museology of São Paulo that was held in the Latin America Memorial in São Paulo in 1990. The Seminar program puts in evidence the particular concerns of the museologist with cultural problems related to heritage and the insertion of professional training in this context, which is a topic that was already approached in her academic researches. Waldisa Rússio, as well as Tereza Scheiner, took part in a specific group of ICOFOM thinkers that insisted in the scientific character of museology internationally, allowing it to be conceived as a social science or an applied social science since the 1980s.

In the theory produced within ICOFOM International Committee for Museology, Rússio has conceived the notion of “museological fact” or “museum fact”, her most known and representative theoretical conception which was derivative of the social fact proposed by Durkheim and Mauss in the field of Sociology. The “museological fact” is thought as the relation of man to the objects of reality and, according to Rússio, it would configure the true object of study of Museology:

“The object of study of museology is the museum fact, or the museological fact. The museological fact is the profound relationship between man, the cognizant subject, and the object: that part of reality to which man belongs, and over which he has the power to act. This relationship comprises several levels of consciousness, and man can perceive an object with his senses: sight, hearing, touch, etc.”

This concept leads to the approach to the social processes documented by museum objects, on the contrary of past approaches in the discipline by which the objects were considered in an isolated form, without the necessary concern with their historical, cultural or social implications.

== Biography ==
BRUNO, Maria Cristina Oliveira. Waldisa Rússio Camargo Guarnieri: textos e contextos de uma trajetória profissional. [Waldisa Rússio Camargo Guarnieri: texts and contexts of a professional journey]. São Paulo: Pinacoteca do Estado / Secretaria de Estado da Cultura / Comitê Brasileiro do Conselho Internacional de Museus, 2010.

BRULON SOARES, B. C.; DE CARVALHO, Luciana Menezes; CRUZ, H. V.. O nascimento da Museologia: confluências e tendências do campo museológico no Brasil. In: MAGALHÃES, Aline Montenegro; BEZERRA, Rafael Zamorano. (Org.). 90 anos do Museu Histórico Nacional em debate (1922–2012). [90 years of the National Historical Museum in debate (1922–2012)]. 1ed. Rio de Janeiro: Museu Histórico Nacional, 2014, p. 244-262.

RUSSIO, W. Interdisciplinarity in museology. Museological Working Papers – MuWoP 2, 1981, p. 56–57.

RUSSIO, W. Methodology of museology and professional training. ICOFOM Study Series – ISS 1, 1983, p. 114–125.

RUSSIO GUARNIERI, W. La muséologie et la formation : une seule méthode. ICOFOM Study Series - ISS 5, 1983, p. 32–39.

== See also ==
- International Committee for Museology
