= André Desvallées =

French museologist (1931–2024)

André Desvallées (20 July 1931 – 5 June 2024) was a French museologist and Honorary General Conservator of Heritage. For 18 years, from 1959 to 1977, he was assistant to Georges Henri Rivière, considered the "father of French museology". He had a leading role in the development of this discipline, and in the creation and definition of several concepts, including "New Museology." An active member of the International Committee of Museology, the ICOFOM, he was the author of a hundred books and articles in the areas of ethnology and museology.

== Biography ==
Desvallées was born in Gouville-sur-Mer, Normandy in 1931. He moved to the suburbs of Paris to attend secondary school at the Lycée Pasteur in Neuilly-sur-Seine. His first vocation was cinema: he developed the admission exam at the Institut des hautes études cinématographiques, IDHEC, currently La Fémis, an acronym corresponding to his former name, Fondation européenne des métiers de l'image et du son (European Foundation for Image and Sound) and became editor of the Cinema Center (CNC), position he held for eight months. At this time he met the future director and television producer Michel Subiela and, a few years later, he met Bernard Chardère, the founder of Positif magazine, in which he collaborated in 1953. Then, he moved to Morocco where he started a career in museums, including the Museum of Popular Arts and Traditions of Rabat. He served the Army in Oran, Algeria, from 1956 to 1958, and then, returned to France.

After his return to France, Desvallées was hired by Georges Henri Rivière, considered the "father of French museology", founder of the National Museum of Popular Arts and Traditions (MNATP) in Paris, and Director of the International Council of Museums (ICOM) from 1946 to 1962. Rivière entrusted to Desvallées the coordination of the museographic conception of the MNATP and the direction of the institution's department of museology, a position he held from 1959 to 1977. During his management he was responsible for the program of temporary exhibitions and for the three permanent exhibition halls where the study gallery was established in 1972 and three years later, the cultural gallery. At the time of its inauguration, the National Museum of Popular Arts and Traditions was considered one of the most innovative in the world.

Desvallées wrote several articles and publications about ethnology, which led him to the position of General Inspector of Classified and Controlled Museums, responsible for the region's ethnography museums. In this context, at the time the first ecomuseums and scientific and technical culture centers were developed, he implemented, within the Direction des musées de France, an experimental sector of assistance to these new forms of museums. From 1984 to 1987, he worked for the National Conservatory of Arts and Crafts as head of the National Museum of Techniques (now Museum of Arts and Crafts). He became an adviser to the director of the Musées de France (also called Service des musées de France, former Direction de musées de France, body of the French Ministry of Culture). He then became a consultant of the National Museum of Popular Arts and Traditions, working alongside Michel Colardelle, the museum's director. Desvallées held this position until his retirement in 1997.

In addition to his activities, Desvalées held various positions in different heritage and research associations, including the Nanterre History Society, the French Ethnology Society, the General Association of Museum and Public Collectors, the French Federation of Friends of the Windmills, among others. From 1978, he began to teach at the École du Louvre, where he began a course on technical and industrial heritage. He then lectured two other courses: museology in nature and language of exhibitions.

Desvallées lived in Nanterre (Hauts-de-Seine) from 1970, where he was a councillor from 1971 to 1989. He died on 5 June 2024, aged 94.

== Points of view on museology ==
Desvallées became a member of the International Council of Museums (ICOM) in 1966 and was a member of the French Committee from 1981 to 1995. This international professional association is structured on national and international committees, divided from research themes and diverse interests. Desvallées became a member of the International Committee of Museology (ICOFOM) in 1980, three years after its foundation. He was ICOFOM's secretary from 1980 to 1983, when he became Vice-President. He held this position until 1998. In 2001 he was appointed permanent adviser and in 2007 he became responsible for the editorial committee of the ICOFOM Study Series (ISS). Back then, he also became member of the editorial board of the scientific journal Publics et Musées, currently Culture et Musées. His fame became international and he was regularly invited to give lectures abroad.

According to Bernard Deloche, some characteristic principles structure the thinking of Desvalées: the vernacular, particular to a country, nation or region; and the technique, or the daily and the utilitarian valuation, that is found in all the museums for which he collaborates; the relation with the object and the need to think it from its context; A concrete vision of the public, that imposes itself on the collections; and finally, the priority given to the other and the difference. These principles are related to the ethnological approach he implements through the expositions he developed and the many articles he wrote throughout his career.

== New Museology ==
Closely linked to the development of new experimental forms of museums, and supported by Georges Henri Rivière and Hugues de Varine Bohan, director of ICOM, Desvallées managed in the Musées des France a fund to support these new experiences, for example the Écomusée du Creusot Montceau-les-Mines, which he obtained international recognition. In order to discuss these experiences, he first uses in 1981, the term "New Museology" in an article for the Universalis Encyclopedia. This concept was widely used by all the professionals who recognized themselves through these new experiences, aiming to put man at the center of the museum as an apparatus, relegating the collection, and emphasizing the commitment of the museum work in favor of society and its development. Thus was founded in 1982 the New Museology and Social Experimentation (MNES) and in 1984, the International Movement for New Museology (MINOM), by Pierre Mayrand, of which Desvallées was one of the founding members.

Desvallées published numerous articles about New Museology and the ecomuseums, but the highlight is the anthology Vagues: une anthologie de la nouvelle muséologie, which he wrote between 1992 and 1994, with the collaboration of Marie-Odile de Bary and François Wasserman, one of the most cited references in the publication.

== Development of Museology ==
The New Museology is an important moment in the history of the museum field, in which Desvallées had a long journey that goes through its history, its theory and its definition on the concepts that guides it. It was during the conception of the MNATP cultural gallery that he became progressively interested in the theoretical concepts underlying the museographic practice. Strongly influenced by Duncan Cameron, especially by his article Un point de vue, le musée comme système de communication, he uses the principles of communicational logic to design with Rivière the museography of the MNATP galleries. It is in this context that he develops the concept of "expôt" in order to translate the term "exhibit" used by Cameron to define the unity of the material in an exhibition. It is also under the same research context, linked to the ecomuseums, that Desvallées implements in the galleries, the presentation of ecological units as conceived by Rivière, "model that restores objects" (real things - vraie chose) in its new context.

The work of defining concepts (including all exposure vocabulary) and a detailed work of the history of the museum institution, led him to take up in 1993, within ICOFOM, the writing of a thesaurus of museology for which he published several preparatory articles. He was invited by François Mairesse in 2000 to write a first set of texts, and in 2007 they published the book Vers une redéfinition du musée? In 2010 they wrote together Les concepts clés de la muséologie (Key concepts of Museology), later translated into a dozen languages. In 2011, they published the Dictionnaire encyclopédique de muséologie.

== Expography ==
Among the terms created and conceptualized by Desvallées for the museum field, "expography" stands out. In 1993, in the Manuel de Muséographie: petit guide à l'usage des in responsables de musée (Manual of Museography: practical guide for museum managers), he creates a complement to the term "museography", segmenting the specialization of the professional responsible for the museum, presenting the term Expography: exhibition + description (POLO, 2006, p. 11). Expography becomes the technique of "writing the exhibition" (BAUER, 2014) and depends on research and conceptualization to communicate a message and establish a link with the public.

It differs from scenography - that focus on the form of the exhibitions - by focusing both form and content. Since museography is the whole set of museum practices, expography, in a simplified way, refers to the specific set of techniques developed to design and execute a museological exhibition.

== Influences ==
Desvallées had two influences in his career: Georges Henri Rivière and Hugues de Varine. Both developed ideas about ecomuseums and the constructive way of this new form of museum, focusing on the social aspect and material and immaterial heritage of the communities in which they developed. Rivière worked with Desvallées for many years, marking his influence also on the modus operandi of the MNATP's museum practices and, later, on his work with the ecomuseums. Varine, author of the term "ecomuseum", influenced Desvallées to develop this concept, which broke with traditional patterns and directed the museological field to the "New Museology" movement.

== Influenced authors ==
In addition to conceptual influences from the Terminology project at ICOFOM, Desvallées influenced a whole generation of professionals focused on ecomuseum practice in France, and its thinking about the (new) museology, originating the association Muséologie nouvelle et expérimentation sociale (MNES) in which they included museologists such as Marie-Odile de Barry, Françoise Wasserman, Alexandre Delarge, Sylvie Douce de la Salles and Joëlle Le Marec.

== Main works ==
- Desvallées A. et Lecotte R., Métiers de traditions. Paris, Braun-Crédit Lyonnais, 1966, 188 p.
- Chapelot J. et Desvallées A., Potiers de Saintonge. Catalogue de l'exposition du Musée national des Arts et traditions populaires. Paris, Rmn, 1973.
- Desvallées A. Musée national des Arts et traditions populaires. Petits guides des grands musées. Paris, Rmn, 1975, 19 p.
- Desvallées A. et Rivière G. H.., Arts populaires des Pays de France, t.1: Matières, techniques et formes. Paris, J. Cuénot, 1975, 207 p.
- Desvallées A., L'Aubrac, tome 6.1, Ethnologie contemporaine, IV, Technique et langage. Les Burons, p. 15-18: "Introduction générale", p. 25-308, ill.: Estivage bovin et fabrication du fromage sur la montagne. Paris, CNRS, 1979.
- Desvallées A., Contribution au Projet de développement des musées. Rennes, MHS et MNES, 1991, 34 p.
- Desvallées A., de Bary M.-O., Wasserman, Vagues, une anthologie de la nouvelle muséologie. Macon et Savigny-le-Temple, W et Mnes, 2 vols.: t.1, 1992, 533 p., t.2, 1994, 275 p.
- Mairesse F., Desvallées A., Vers une redéfinition du musée. Paris, L'Harmattan, 2007, 227 p.
- Desvallées A., Quai Branly: un miroir aux alouettes? À propos d'ethnographie et d'« arts premiers ». Paris, L'Harmattan, 2008, 198 p.
- (en) Davis Ann, Mairesse François, Desvallées André, 2010, What is a Museum?, Munich, Verlag D.C. Müller-Straten, 218 p.
- Desvallées André, Mairesse François (dir.), 2010, Concepts clés de muséologie, Paris, Armand Colin et ICOM, 87 p. Disponible sur le site Internet de l'ICOM (www.icom.museum)
- Desvallées A., Mairesse F., Dictionnaire encyclopédique de muséologie. Paris, Armand Colin, 2011, 723 p.
