= Jiří V. Neustupný =

Jiří Václav Neustupný (October 31, 1933 – July 2, 2015) was a Czech–Australian linguist and japanologist, and professor at Monash University, Australia, and Osaka University, Chiba University and Obirin University, Japan.

== Biography ==
Jiří V. Neustupný studied Japanese and history of the Far East at the Faculty of Philology, Charles University, Prague, Czechoslovakia. In 1964 he obtained CSc. (Ph.D.) from the Oriental Institute of the Czechoslovak Academy of Sciences and started to work there as a research fellow. He became professor of Japanese at Monash University, Australia, in 1966. After his retirement from Monash in 1993 he lectured in Japan at the universities in Osaka, Chiba and then Obirin. He contributed to the theory of language planning and to language education in Japan. Together with Björn Jernudd, he is a founder of the Language Management Theory. In 2013, Neustupný received the Order of the Rising Sun.

== Selected bibliography ==
- Neustupný, J. V. (1974) Basic types of treatment of language problems. In J. A. Fishman (Ed.), Advances in Language Planning (pp. 37–48). The Hague, Paris: Mouton (preprint in Linguistic Communications 1, 1970, 77–98).
- Neustupný, J. V. (1978) Post-Structural Approaches to Language: Language Theory in a Japanese Context, Tokyo: University of Tokyo Press.
- Neustupný, J. V. (1982) Gaikokujin tono komyunikēshon [Communicating with Foreigners], Tokyo: Iwanami Shinsho.
- Neustupný, J. V. (1987) Communicating with the Japanese, Tokyo: The Japan Times.
- Jernudd, B. H. & Neustupný, J. V. (1987) Language planning: for whom? In L. Laforge (ed.), Actes du Colloque international sur l’aménagement linguistique / Proceedings of the International Colloquium on Language Planning (pp. 69–84). Québec: Les Presses de L’Université Laval.
- Neustupný, J. V. (1995) Atarashii nihongo kyōiku no tameni [Towards a New Japanese Education], Tokyo: Taishūkan.
- Neustupný, J. V. & Nekvapil, J. (2003) Language management in the Czech Republic. Current Issues in Language Planning 4(3&4), 181–366.

== Family ==
- Jiří Neustupný, father, archeologist
- Evžen Neustupný, brother, archeologist
- Reiko Neustupný, wife
- Marika Neustupný, daughter, architect
- Peter Neustupný, son, lawyer
