= Vinoš Sofka =

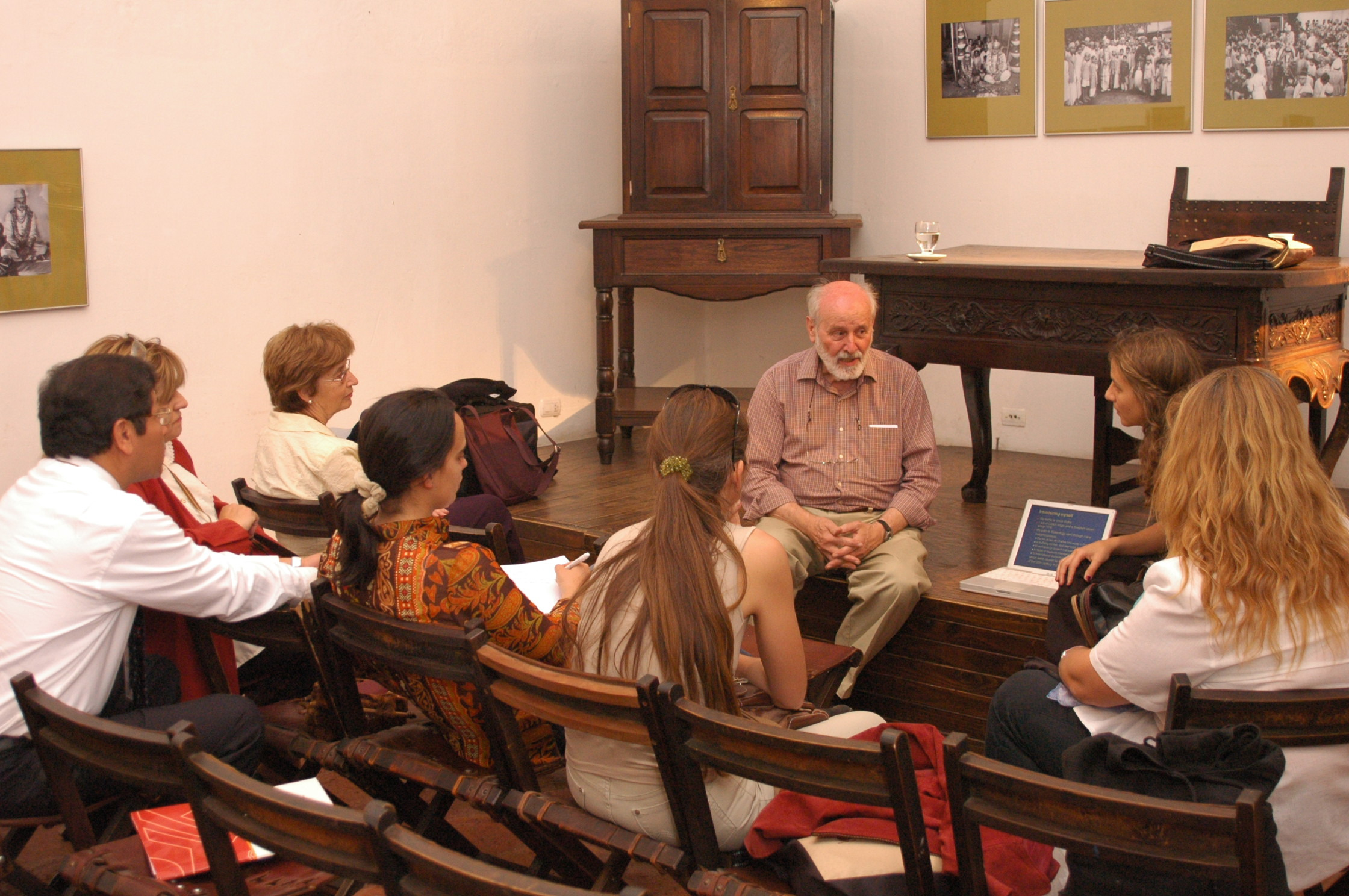
ICOFOM Vinos Sofka

Vinoš Sofka (4 July 1929 – 9 February 2016) was a museologist. He co-founded the International Committee for Museology (ICOFOM) in 1977 and served as its chairman and vice chair.

== Life and career ==
Vinoš Sofka was born in 1929 in Brno, Czechoslovakia (now Czech Republic), the eldest of four children. He studied law at Prague University but was not permitted to work as a lawyer, instead becoming a bricklayer; he eventually became assistant director of the Archaeological Institute at the Czechoslovak Academy of Sciences.

In 1962, Sofka took over coordination of the exhibition celebrating the anniversary of Great Moravia. He travelled with the Great Moravia exhibition as curator to Germany (both East and West Berlin), Greece, Austria, Poland and Sweden.

After the end of the Prague Spring movement in 1968, he moved to Sweden, where he worked at the Museum of National Antiquities in Stockholm, heading its developmental section. He and his wife were sentenced in absentia by the Czechoslovak authorities to two years' imprisonment; he became a Swedish citizen in 1976.

Sofka co-founded ICOFOM in 1977 and was its chairman from 1982 to 1989. He was an ICOM Executive Council member from 1989 to 1992 and Vice Chair from 1992 to 1995.

In 1990 he became chair of the Scientific and Pedagogical Council at the International School of Museology at Jan Evangelista Purkyně University (now Masaryk University) in Brno, and in 1994 became inaugural holder of the first UNESCO Chair of Museology and the World Heritage at Masaryk University. He retired from the university in 2002 and retired completely in 2013, when he moved to a nursing home in Uppsala; he died there in February 2016.

== Influence ==
In 1976, Sofka was invited to write an article about museology for a practical manual of museum work: Museiteknik. Many of his ideas about museology, in particular the importance of distinguishing between it and subject-oriented study using museum collections, were crystallised in his 1978 paper, "Research in and on the Museum". He developed 'From oppression to democracy', an approach to rapprochement in the wake of the fall of communism through heritage that won UNESCO approval, and began the ICOFOM publication series.

Sofka played an important role in bringing together Eastern and Western approaches to museology, and directly and indirectly influenced museologists of the next generation. He also raised awareness of museology worldwide, in particular in Scandinavia.

== Honours ==
He was awarded an honorary doctorate by the University of Uppsala in 1991. In 2007 he was appointed an honorary member of ICOM.

== Private life ==
During his life in Czechoslovakia Vinos Sofka was married to Jaroslava (born Hartlová). Their common interest in archaeology and history brought them to employments at Czech Academy of Sciences and the University of E. Purkyne in Brno. They had two daughters (Helena born 1953 and Hana born 1954. After the death of Jaroslava in 1983, Sofka had a personal and professional partnership with Suzanne Nash, whom he met at ICOM.
