= Peter van Mensch =

Peter van Mensch (born June 7, 1947 - ?, in Gouda, Netherlands) is a Dutch scholar in the field of museology, and previously a professor of Cultural Heritage at Amsterdam University of the Arts.

== Biography ==
Peter van Mensch earned an MSc degree in Zoology and Archaeology at the University of Amsterdam. He worked in the field of archaeology at the Government Agency for Field Archaeology and later at the University of Amsterdam. He devoted his professional career to Museology and worked between 1967 and 1982 for several museums of history, applied arts and natural history in the Netherlands. Since 1977 till 1982, he was director of educational programmes and exhibitions for the National Museum of Natural History in Leiden.

In 1982 he became a senior lecturer in theoretical museology and museum ethics at the Reinwardt Academy. There, he served as the director of the academy's International Master Degree Programme in Museology (1998–2001 and 2005–2010). He earned his PhD degree at the University of Zagreb on the basis of a thesis Towards a Methodology of Museology (1993). He was appointed as the first professor of cultural heritage at the Amsterdam School of the Arts (2006) and as such, he was responsible for the academy's research program.

Van Mensch was active in the ICOM International Committee for Education and Cultural Action (CECA), the ICOM International Committee for Training (ICTOP) and the International Committee for Museology (ICOM), the last of which he was president (1989–1993). As chair of the preliminary board, he played a role in the creation of a new ICOM international committee, called the International Committee for Collecting (COMCOL) (2010).

Peter van Mensch has been a guest lecturer at many international museology programs, such as the museology program of the University of São Paulo (Brazil), the International Summer School of Museology at Brno (Czech Republic), the Baltic Museology School (Latvia) and the International School of Museology at Celje (Slovenia).

== Work ==
Van Mensch is an acknowledged scientist engaged in theoretical museology. He is interested in new trends in museology and also focuses on the development of museology as an integral and integrated approach to cultural heritage. In his thesis Towards a Methodology of Museology, he analyzes the current achievements of museology and formulates principles that are recognised by all museology codes.

Van Mensch played a significant role in developing the curriculum of the bachelor and master programs of the Reinwardt Academy for Cultural Heritage (Amsterdam) and was instrumental in building this academy's reputation as a professional training institution.

== Select bibliography ==
- Peter van Mensch, 'Nieuwe visies voor de 21ste eeuw', Museumvisie 24, 2000, (1): ii–ix.
- Peter van Mensch, 'Symbolische ondoorzichtigheid. Het Jüdische Museum en het Felix Nussbaum-Haus van Daniel Libeskind', kM 2000 (33): 16.
- Peter van Mensch, 'Museology as a profession', ICOM Study Series 2000 (8): 20–21.
- Peter van Mensch, 'Tussen object en samenlevin'g. 25 Jaar musea van natuurwetenschap en techniek in Nederland', Gewina 23, 2000, (3): 193–206.
- Peter van Mensch, ‘Tussen narratieve detaillering en authenticiteit. Dilemma’s van een contextgeörienteerde ethiek’, in: Interieurs belicht. Jaarboek Rijksdienst voor de Monumentenzorg (Zwolle-Zeist 2001) 46–55.
- Peter van Mensch, ‘Museum studies in the Netherlands’, in: Matoula Scaltsa red., Museology towards the 21st century. Theory and practice. International Symposium Proceedings [Thessaloniki, 21–24 November 1997] (Thessaloniki 2001) 146–149.
- Peter van Mensch, ‘… a identitade de um museu nao é ser um parque temático […the identity of a museum : it is not to be a theme park]’, in: Anais Museu Histórico Nacional 34 (Rio de Janeiro 2002) 245–264.
- Peter van Mensch, ‘The characteristics of exhibitions’, Museum Aktuell (92), 2003: 3980–3985.
- Peter van Mensch, 'Convergence and divergence. Museums of science and technology in historical perspective', in: Cyril Simard ed., Des métiers ... de la tradition a la creation. Anthologie en faveur d'un patrimoine qui gagne sa vie (Sainte-Foy 2003) 342–352.
- Peter van Mensch, 'Eco's ideale museum: een nachtmerrie', Museumvisie 28, 2004, (1): 26–27.
- Peter van Mensch, 'Museology and management: enemies or friends? Current tendencies in theoretical museology and museum management in Europe', in: E. Mizushima ed., Museum management in the 21st century (Museum Management Academy, Tokyo 2004) 3–19.
- Alex de Vries, 'Cultureel erfgoed is van iedereen en van niemand. Peter van Mensch in gesprek met Susan Legene', in: Cultureel Goed! Underground Theory 2 (ArtEZ, Arnhem 2004) 47–62.
- Peter van Mensch, 'Obiljezja izlozbi', Informatica Museologica 34, 2003, (3–4): 6–12.
- Peter van Mensch, 'De uitvinding van het verleden. Jonkheer Henri van Sypesteyn op zoek naar zijn stamslot', in: Rob van der Laarse & Yme Kuiper ed., Beelden van de Buitenplaats. Elitevorming en notabelencultuur in Nederland in de negentiende eeuw. Adelsgeschiedenis 3 (Verloren, Hilversum 2005) 195–210.
- Peter van Mensch, 'Nieuwe museologie. Identiteit of erfgoed?', in: Rob van der Laarse ed., Bezeten van vroeger. Erfgoed, identiteit en musealisering (Het Spinhuis, Amsterdam 2005) 176–192.
- Peter van Mensch, 'Annotating the environment. Heritage and new technologies', Nordisk Museologi 2005 (2): 14–27.
- Peter van Mensch, 'Museums and experience. Towards a new model of explanation', ABRA (Revista de la Facultad de Ciencias Sociales, Universidad Nacional, Heredia, Costa Rica) 33, 2004 (2006): 31–36.
- Peter van Mensch, [Professionalization in international perspective], Chinese Museum 2006 (3).
- Peter van Mensch, 'Afstoten in perspectief: van instelling naar netwerk. Terugblik op twintig jaar selectie en afstoting', in: Petra Timmer & Arjen Kok ed., Niets gaat verloren. Twintig jaar selectie en afstoting uit Nederlandse museale collecties (Boekmanstudies/Instituut Collectie Nederland, Amsterdam 2007) 208–211.
- Peter van Mensch, 'Een integraal perspectief op erfgoed', Oud Nieuws. Tijdschrift over Cultureel Erfgoed en Educatie 2007 (3): 16.
- Peter van Mensch, ‘Het object centraal? De toekomst van restauratie’, Cr. Interdisciplinair tijdschrift voor conservering en restauratie 8, 2007, (4): 18–19.
- Peter van Mensch, ‘Bilježenje ambijenta/Naslijeđe i nove tehnologije’, Vizura, Časopis za savremene vizualne umjetnosti, likovnu krikiku i teoriju [Magazine for contemporary visual arts, art critic and theory] (City Gallery Collegium Artisticum, Sarajevo, Bosnia and Herzegovina) 2007 (1).
- Peter van Mensch, ‘Collectieontwikkeling of geld verdienen? De dilemma’s van het afstoten van museumvoorwerpen’, Kunstlicht. Tijdschrift voor beeldende kunst, beeldcultuur en architectuur van de oudheid tot heden 29, 2008, (1/2): 56–59.
- Peter van Mensch, ‘Pantheon, museum of historisch huis? Drie inrichtingsmodellen voor het Muiderslot', in: Muiderslot. Authenticiteit en verbeelding. Jaarboek Cuypersgenootschap 2008: 39–54.
- Peter van Mensch, ‘Uiteindelijk gaat het toch om de schoolplaten … of niet?', Lessen (Periodiek van het Nationaal Onderwijsmuseum en de Vereniging van Vrienden) 3, 2008, (2): 13–17.
- Léontine Meijer & Peter van Mensch,’Teaching theory, practice and ethics of collecting at the Reinwardt Academie', Collectingnet 2008 (4): 6–7.
- Nancy van Asseldonk, Peter van Mensch en Harry van Vliet ed., Cultuur in context. Erfgoeddata in nieuwe samenhang (Reinwardt Academie, Amsterdam 2009).
- Peter van Mensch, ‘De-institutionalising musealisation : lieu de mémoire versus musealium’, in: Muzealizace v soudobé společnosti a posláni muzeologie/Musealization in contemporary society and role of museology (Czech Association of Museums and Galleries, Prague 2008)
- Eric Ketelaar, Frank Huysmans & Peter van Mensch, ‘The Netherlands : Archives, Libraries, and Museums’, in : Encyclopedia of Library and Information Sciences (Taylor & Francis, New York 2009, third edition) 3874–4147.
- Peter van Mensch, ‘De tijgers van Zoetermeer’, in: André Koch & Jouetta van der Ploeg ed., 4289 Wisselwerking. De Wonderkamer van Zoetermeer. Verslag van een geslaagd museaal experiment (Stadsmuseum Zoetermeer, Zoetermeer 2009) 32–34.
- Peter van Mensch, ‘Développer la collection ou gagner de l’argent? Les dilemmes de l’aliénation’, in: François Mairesse ed., L’alienation des collections de musée en question (Mariemont 2009) 69–73.
- Peter van Mensch, ‘Ivo Maroević: osoba koja je u mnogome pomogla u mojem profesionanom razvoju’, in: Domagoj Marovević (ed.) Ivo Maroević. Zrnca životnog mazaika 1937–2007 (Muzej Prigorja, Zagreb 2009) 22–23.
- Peter van Mensch, ´Zwischen Aura und Qualität´, in: M. Henker (Herausg.) Alles Qualität ... oder was? Wege zu einen guten Museum. 15. Bayerischer Museumstag, Ingolstadt 22.–24. Juli 2009 (München 2010) 15–17.
- Peter van Mensch and Léontine Meijer-van Mensch, ‘Collecting as intangible heritage’, Collectingnet Newsletter 2010 (9): 2–4.
- Peter van Mensch, ‘Notas sobre os arredores: patrimônio e novas tecnologias’, Musas. Revista Brasiliera de Museus e Museologia 4, 2009, (4): 11–23.
- Léontine Meijer-van Mensch and Peter van Mensch, ‘From disciplinary control to co-creation. Collecting and the development of museums as praxis in the nineteenth and twentieth century’, in: Encouraging collections mobility – a way forward for museums in Europe (Helsinki 2010) 33–53.
- Peter van Mensch, ‘”Against all norms and values”. Dilemmas of collecting controversial contemporary objects’, COMCOL Newsletter 2010 (1): 3–5.
- Léontine Meijer-van Mensch & Peter van Mensch, ‘Plaatsen van het gebeuren. Digitale ontsluiting van betekenis en herinnering’, MM Nieuws 2010 (6): 6–7.
- Peter van Mensch, ‘The musealisation of Knut. Dilemmas in the relationship between zoos and museums’, COMCOL Newsletter 2011 (13): 4–7.
