= Georges Henri Rivière =

French museologist (1897–1985)

Georges-Henri Rivière (1897–1985) was a French museologist, and innovator of modern French ethnographic museology practices.

== Biography ==
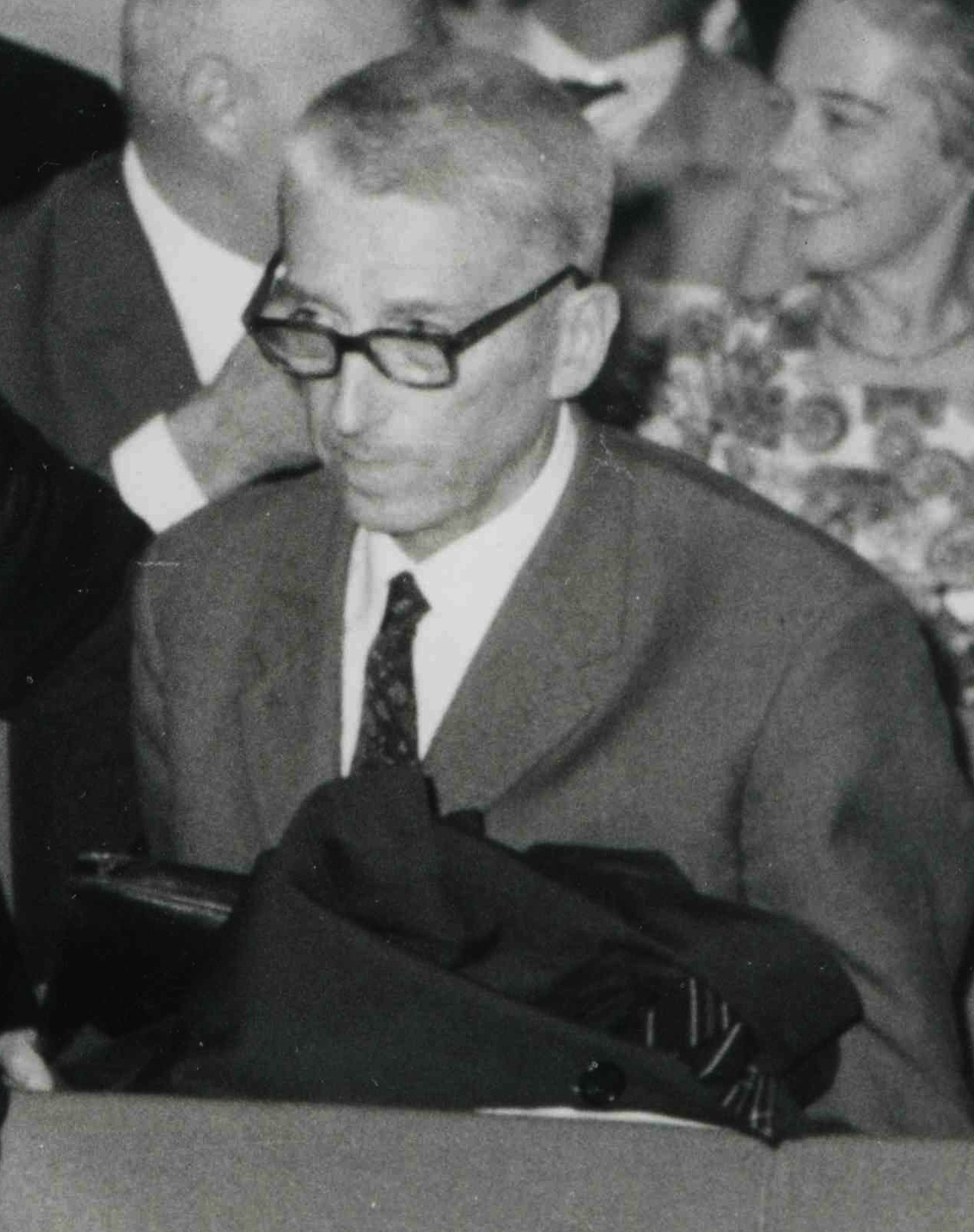

Rivière studied music until 1925, when he began museum studies at the École du Louvre from which he graduated in 1928. During the following years, he cared for the D. David-Weill collection, which included Chinese porcelains, Greek and Roman antiquities, and European decorative arts and paintings. In 1928, Rivière curated his first show of ancient American art at the Musée des Arts Décoratifs and joined Paul Rivet as his vice-director to begin the renovation of the dusty Musée du Trocadéro, which was reintroduced to the public as a fully modernized Musée de l'Homme in 1938.

In 1929 and 1930, Rivière was on the editorial board of Documents, to which he also contributed articles, such as “The Ethnographical museum of the Trocadéro" (1929, issue 1), as well as chronicles on popular culture such as “Religion and ‘Folies-Bergère’” (1930, issue 4), and profiles on jazz musicians such as Eddie South and Hayman Swayze. During the thirties, Rivière financed ambitious research projects such as the Dakar-Djibouti mission, headed by Marcel Griaule, and the Sahara-Soudan mission, which provided in-depth research and enough material for over seventy ethnographic exhibitions between 1928 and 1937.

That year, he launched the Musée National des Arts et Traditions Populaires, also based on the Trocadéro museum's ethnographic collections. Oriented toward public education, its collection and exhibitions programme first focused on popular traditional art forms before dedicating itself to science and research with the introduction of the Centre d'Ethnologie Française, inaugurated shortly after the Second World War. Between 1948 and 1965, Rivière served as the first acting director of ICOM, the International Council of Museums, to which he returned as Permanent Advisor in 1968.

Widely credited for introducing the concept of the ecomuseum, which attempts to portray civilizations in their natural environments, he was one of the most highly esteemed museological entrepreneurs in modern France. The review Museum dedicated an entire issue to ecomuseums (No. 148, 1985), and included an article by Rivière titled "The ecomuseum, an evolutive definition". La muséologie selon Georges-Henri Rivière, was published posthumously in 1989.

== Works ==
- La muséologie selon Georges-Henri Rivière (1989)

== Articles ==
- Isac Chiva, George-Henri Rivière: un demi-siècle d'ethnologie de la France, Terrain, Numéro 5 — Identité culturelle et appartenance régionale (Octobre 1985), put online 17 July 2005 (in French)

== Sources ==
- French Ministry of Culture (in French)
- Definition of the ecomuseum according to Georges-Henri Rivière (1976) (in French)
