= TER Languedoc-Roussillon =

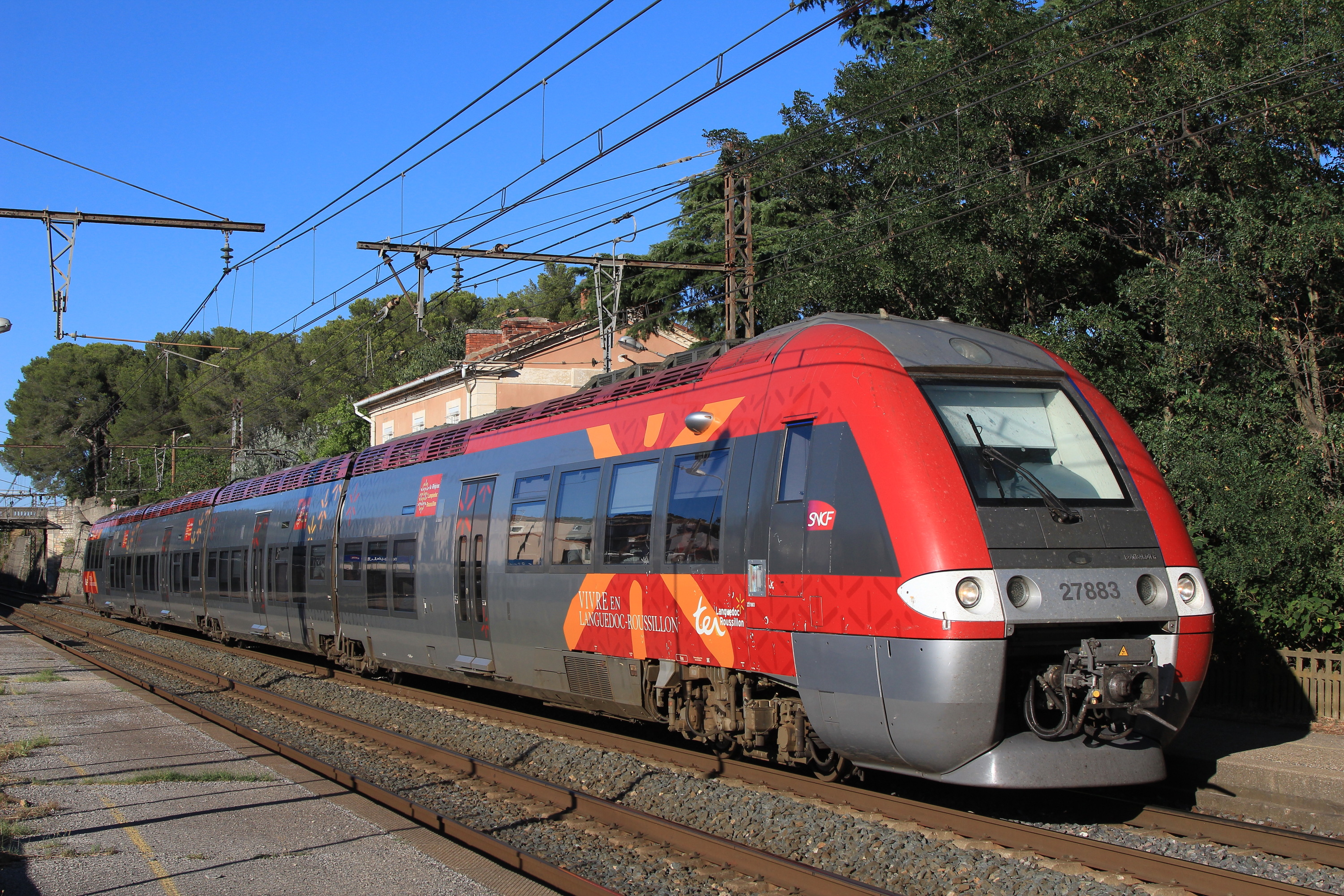
- Z 27500 in TER Languedoc-Roussillon branding.

Overview
- Owner: RFF/SNCF
- Transit type: TER
- Number of stations: 146
- Daily ridership: 21,500
- Website: TER site (archived)

Operation
- Began operation: 1986
- Ended operation: 1 July 2017
- Operator: SNCF

Technical
- Track gauge: 1,435 mm (4 ft 8 1/2 in) standard gauge
System map
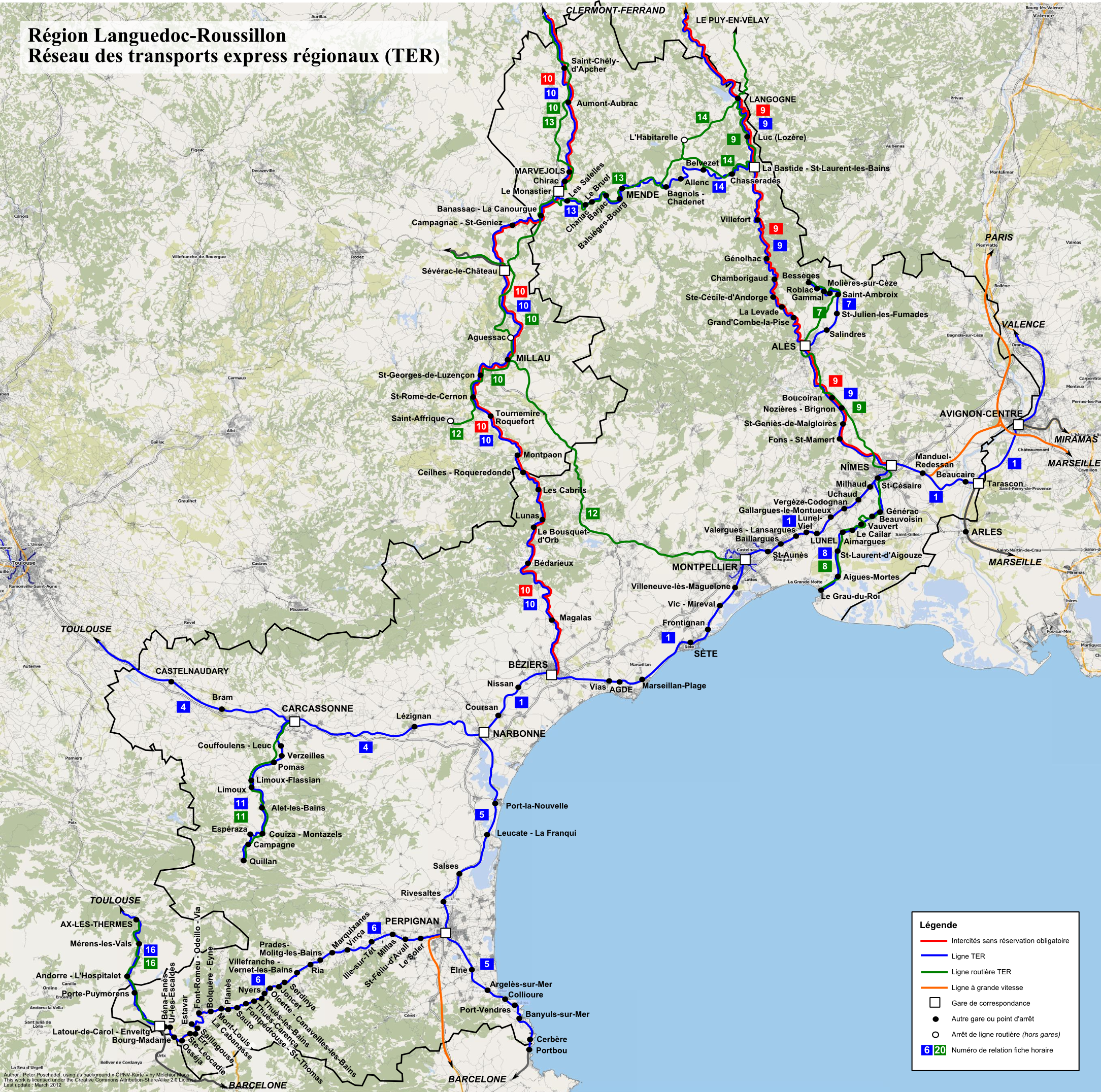

TER Languedoc-Roussillon was the regional rail network serving the Languedoc-Roussillon région in France. The région became the organising authority on 1 January 2002. In 2017 it was merged into the new TER Occitanie.

== Network ==
=== Rail ===
Line	Route	Frequency	Notes
1	Narbonne ... Béziers ... Agde ... Sète – Frontignan ... Montpellier-Saint-Roch ... Lunel ... Nîmes ... Tarascon – Avignon-Centre		
2	Perpignan – Narbonne – Béziers – Agde – Sète – Frontignan† – Montpellier-Saint-Roch – Lunel† – Nîmes – Tarascon – Avignon-Centre		express services of lines 1 and 5
3	Narbonne – Béziers – Agde – Sète – Frontignan† – Montpellier-Saint-Roch – Lunel† – Nîmes – Tarascon – Arles – Miramas ... Marseille-Saint-Charles		
4	Toulouse-Matabiau – Labège-Innopole† – Villefranche-de-Lauragais – Castelnaudary – Bram – Carcassonne – Lézignan-Corbières – Narbonne	6× per day Narbonne–Toulouse, 3× per day Narbonne–Castelnaudary, 5× per day Narbonne–Carcassonne, for additional trains between Carcassonne and Toulouse see TER Midi-Pyrénées line 20	
5	Portbou – Cerbère ... Perpignan ... Narbonne		
6	Latour-de-Carol-Enveitg – Béna Fanès – Ur-Les Escaldes – Bourg-Madame – Osséja – Sainte-Léocadie – Err – Saillagouse – Estavar – Font-Romeu-Odeillo-Via – Bolquère-Eyne – Mont-Louis-La Cabanasse – Planès – Sauto – Fontpédrouse-Saint-Thomas-les-Bains – Thuès-Entre-Valls – Thuès-les-Bains – Nyers – Olette-Canaveilles-les-Bains – Joncet – Serdinya – Villefranche-Vernet-les-Bains Villefranche-Vernet-les-Bains ... Perpignan		
7	Alès ... Bessèges		
8	Nîmes ... Vauvert ... Le Grau-du-Roi		
9	Clermont-Ferrand ... Brioude ... Langeac ... Génolhac ... Alès ... Nîmes		
11	Carcassonne – Couffoulens-Leuc – Verzeille – Pomas – Limoux-Flassian – Limoux – Alet-les-Bains – Couiza-Montazels – Espéraza – Campagne – Quillan	2× per day Carcassonne–Quillan, 4× per day Carcassonne–Limoux	
13	Mende ... Marvejols ... Saint-Chély-d'Apcher		
14	Mende ... La Bastide-Saint-Laurent ... Alès		
† Not all trains call at this station

=== Road ===
- Montpellier–Saint-Affrique

== Rolling stock ==
=== Multiple units ===
- Ligne de Cerdagne
  - SNCF Class Z 100
  - SNCF Class Z 150
  - SNCF Class Z 200
- SNCF Class Z 7300
- SNCF Class X 2200 (Also called: X 92200)
- SNCF Class X 4500
- SNCF Class X 72500
- SNCF Class X 73500

=== Locomotives ===
- SNCF Class BB 7200
- SNCF Class BB 8500
- SNCF Class BB 9300
- SNCF Class BB 9600

=== On order ===
Twenty-five trains are on order and should be delivered 2007–2008.

- 21 electric 4 piece Z 27500
- 4 hybrid (diesel and electric) 3 piece B 81500

== Kartatoo ==
Kartatoo is a public transport pass system introduced during the first term of 2007. The Kartatoo card was introduced using an optional subscription system to Urban networks at a reduced price. This system is offered to TER commuters (Via pro for labourers) and allows users to purchase a monthly ticket on the Montpellier Agglomération and Nîmes Métropole networks. The scheme should be open to students (Via études) from September 2007 and to all from the end of 2008.

These new measures also come with the creation of 3 new fare zones between Montpellier and Nîmes. West to East, the three zones are centred on Montpellier (from the station Villeneuve-lès-Maguelone to that of Saint-Brès–Mudaison), Lunel (Valergues–Lunel-Vieil to Uchaud) and Nîmes (Milhaud to Manduel–Redessan).

The affected area will be extended towards the West to Agde, Béziers and Narbonne during 2008 with all inhabitants of Languedoc-Roussillon concerned from 2009.

== Statistics ==
- 1341 km of passenger lines
- 521 km of Double track lines
- 834 km of electrified lines
- 780 level crossings of which 23 are temporary
- 191 tunnels for 52 km
- 2322 rail bridges
- 28 individual lines

== See also ==
- SNCF
- Transport express régional
- Réseau Ferré de France
- List of SNCF stations
- List of SNCF stations in Languedoc-Roussillon
- Languedoc-Roussillon
