= La Gare de Perpignan =

Painting by Salvador Dalí

- Artist: Salvador Dalí
- Year: c. 1965
- Medium: Oil on canvas
- Dimensions: 296 cm × 406 cm (117 in × 160 in)
- Location: Museum Ludwig; Cologne

La Gare de Perpignan (Perpignan Train Station also known as Pop-Op-Yes-Yes-Pompier) is a c. 1965 large-scale oil on canvas painting by the Spanish surrealist Salvador Dalí, on display in the Museum Ludwig in Cologne.

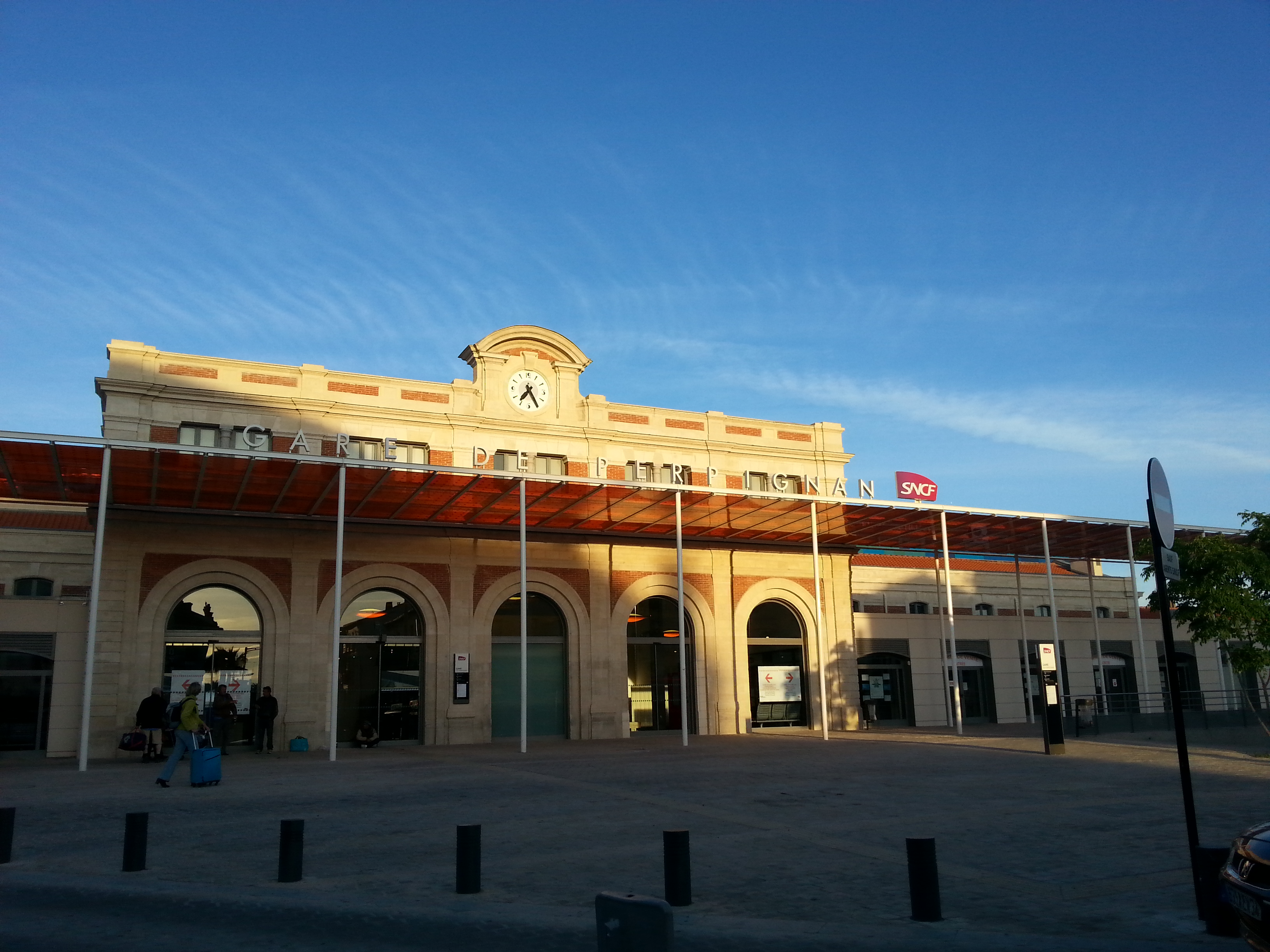
The Perpignan railway station, which Dalí proclaimed to be the "center of the Universe" after a cosmogonic ecstasy experience

The railway station of the French city of Perpignan, near the border with Spain, held special significance for Dalí, who had proclaimed it to be the "Center of the Universe" after experiencing a vision of cosmogonic ecstasy there in 1963.

== Description ==
The sacrifice of the son is imaged in the form of Christ on the Cross, with his crown of thorns, floating in the center of the composition. The bleeding wound of Christ is associated with the farmer's fork (on the right) thrust into the ground (as a fertility ritual). Dalí is represented twice in the vertical axis: he appears in the light at the center of the image, seen from below, floating with arms spread, and again at the top of the painting. On the bottom of the painting lies a calm sea with a boat, an ancient symbol of the passage from life to death, reinforcing the theme of Christ's sacrifice. Above the sea, a woman seen from the back watches these scenes, immobile, and recalling the helplessness of man facing death, symbolized not only by the bloody wounds of Christ, but also by Dalí, who, spread-eagled, seems to fall into nothingness.

At the top center of the painting, a flat wagon carrying a specialized trailer comes out of nowhere (characteristic of Surrealism), and reminds one of the central themes of the painting, the railway station of Perpignan in France, near the Spanish border in the Pyrenees. The left side of the painting shows embodiment of positive values (the couple on the bags of wheat represent labor, and the man in a meditative pose embodies respect), while on the right of the image are embodied sins and suffering (the man and woman representing lust, and the woman mourning). The two figures flanking the far left and right sides are taken from The Angelus, a well-known pious painting by the French artist Jean-François Millet.

== Impact ==
Around the turn of the millennium, police investigating the Gare de Perpignan murders, were short of other fruitful lines of inquiry, so were speculating whether the serial killer was inspired by the tortured visions of Dalí, in particular La Gare de Perpignan with the sinful image on the right of a man and woman representing lust. This line of inquiry was dramatised in the French true crime television series, the Lost Station Girls, released in 2025.

== See also ==
- List of works by Salvador Dalí

== Bibliography ==
- Salvador Dali: la gare de Perpignan; accompagnée d'une petite retrospective (in French) (1977 ed.). The Gallery. 1978. OCLC 14695833.
- Borger, Hugo (1986). Museums in Cologne : a guide to 26 collections, with an appendix containing the addresses of the most important art and antique dealers (1986 ed.). Pestel-Verlag. p. 280. ISBN 9783791307879.
- Salvador Dalí : la Gare de Perpignan; Pop, Op, Yes-yes, Pompier; [Museum Ludwig, Köln, 18. März bis 25. Juni 2006]. Hatje Cantz. 2006. p. 266. ISBN 9783775717380.
