= Castelnaudary station =

Railway station in Occitanie, France

Coordinates: 43°18′43″N 1°56′59″E

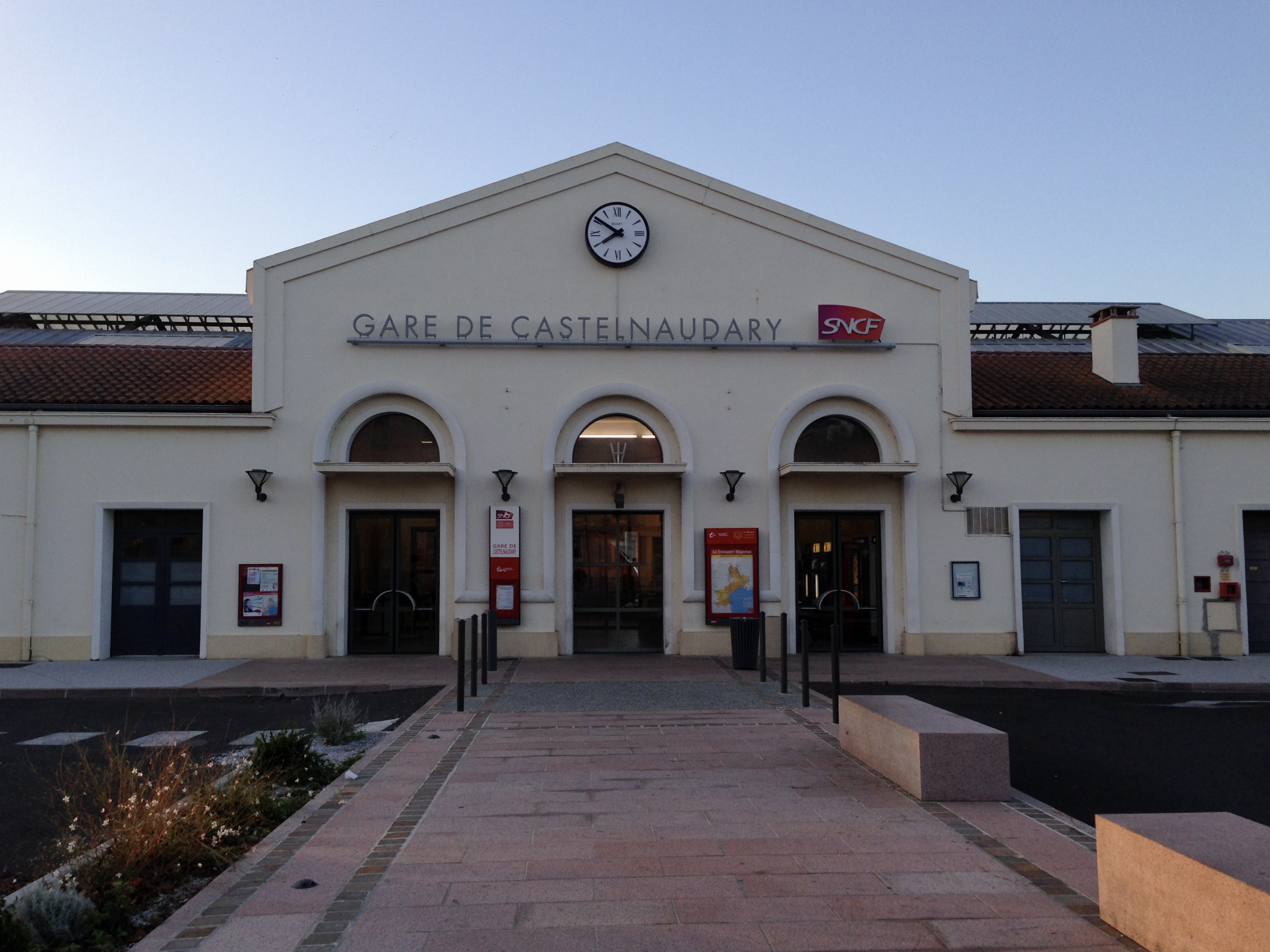
Gare de Castelnaudary

Castelnaudary is a railway station in Castelnaudary, Occitanie, France. The station opened on 22 April 1857 and is on the Bordeaux–Sète line. It is at the southern end of the town, about a 5–10-minute walk from the centre. The station is served by Intercités (long distance, as well as night train) and TER (local) services operated by the SNCF.

== Train services ==
The following services currently call at Castelnaudary:

- night services (Intercités de nuit) Paris–Narbonne–Cerbère
- local service (TER Occitanie) Toulouse–Carcassonne–Narbonne

Preceding station	SNCF	Following station
Les Aubrais towards Paris-Austerlitz	Intercités (night)	Carcassonne towards Cerbère
Preceding station	TER Occitanie	Following station
Avignonet towards Toulouse	10	Bram towards Narbonne
Bram towards Portbou	25	Villefranche-de-Lauragais towards Toulouse
