= Baziège station =

Railway station in Baziège, France

Baziège
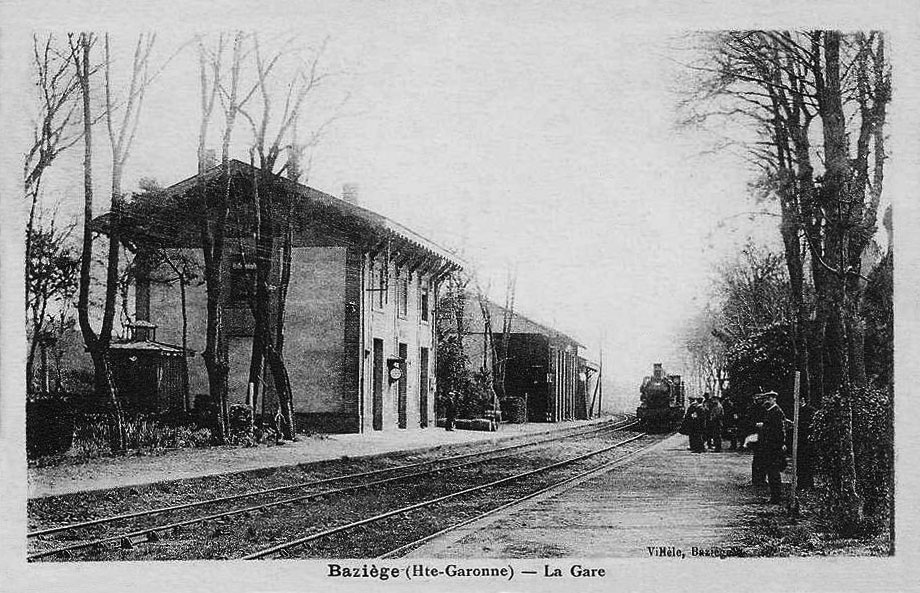

General information
- Location: Baziège, Occitanie, France
- Coordinates: 43.4535°N 1.6206°E
- Line: Bordeaux–Sète railway

Other information
- Station code: 87611723

Services
Preceding station	TER Occitanie	Following station
Montlaur towards Toulouse	10	Villenouvelle towards Narbonne
Villefranche-de-Lauragais towards Portbou	25	Escalquens towards Toulouse
Location

Baziège is a railway station in Baziège, Occitanie, southern France. Within TER Occitanie, it is part of lines 10 (Toulouse–Narbonne) and 25 (Portbou–Toulouse).
