= Villefranche-de-Lauragais station =

Railway station in Villefranche-de-Lauragais, France

Villefranche-de-Lauragais
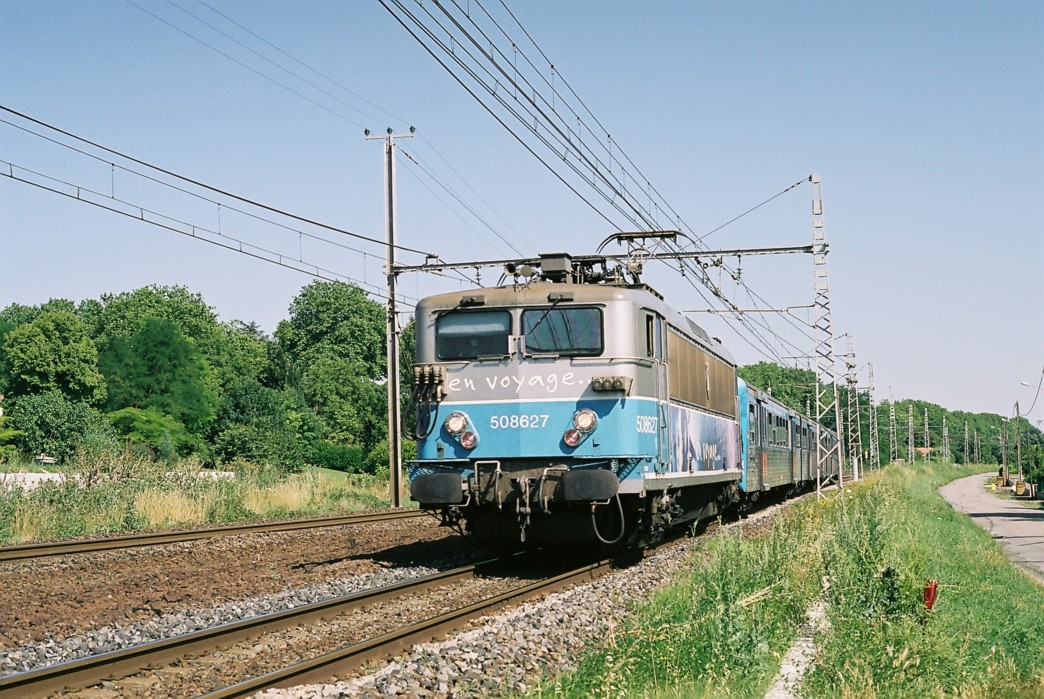

General information
- Location: Villefranche-de-Lauragais, Occitanie, France
- Coordinates: 43.39843°N 1.71457°E
- Line: Bordeaux–Sète railway

Other information
- Station code: 87615013

Services
Preceding station	TER Occitanie	Following station
Villenouvelle towards Toulouse	10	Avignonet towards Narbonne
Castelnaudary towards Portbou	25	Baziège towards Toulouse
Location

Villefranche-de-Lauragais station (French: Gare de Villefranche-de-Lauragais) is a railway station located in Villefranche-de-Lauragais, Occitanie, southern France. Within TER Occitanie, it is part of lines 10 (Toulouse–Narbonne) and 25 (Portbou–Toulouse).
