= Lézignan-Corbières station =

Railway station in Lézignan-Corbières, France

Lézignan-Corbières
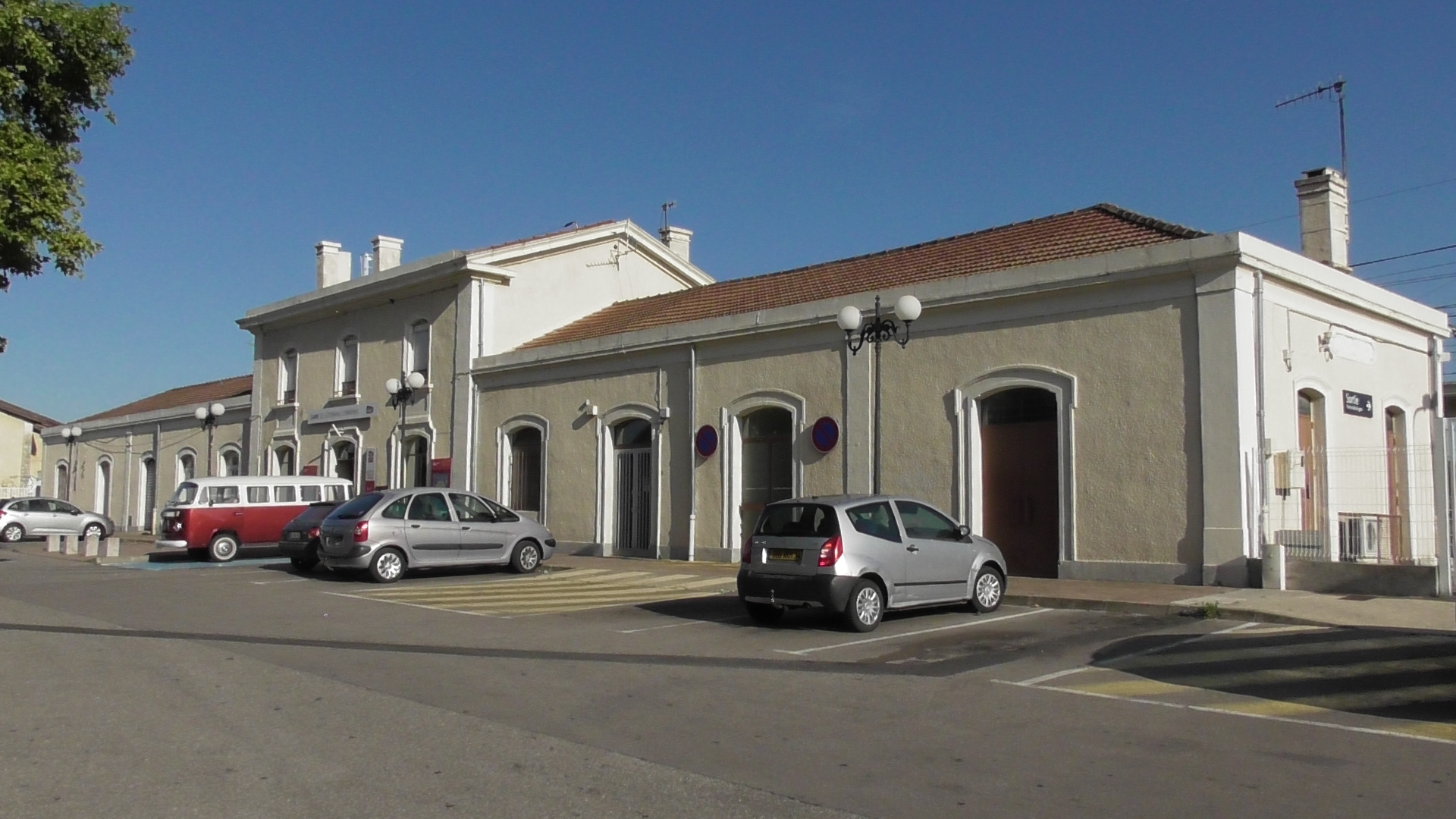
- Gare de Lézignan-Corbières

General information
- Location: Lézignan-Corbières, Occitanie, France
- Coordinates: 43.19993°N 2.76941°E
- Line: L4 of TER Occitanie

Other information
- Station code: 87615112

Services
Preceding station	SNCF	Following station
Carcassonne towards Paris-Austerlitz	Intercités (night)	Narbonne towards Cerbère
Preceding station	TER Occitanie	Following station
Carcassonne towards Toulouse	10	Narbonne Terminus
Narbonne towards Portbou	25	Carcassonne towards Toulouse
Location

Lézignan-Corbières is a railway station in Lézignan-Corbières, Occitanie, southern France. Within TER Occitanie, it is part of lines 10 (Toulouse–Narbonne) and 25 (Toulouse–Portbou).
