= Jacques Rançon =

French rapist and serial killer

- Born: Jacques Rançon; March 9, 1960 (age 66); Hailles, France
- Other name: "The Perpignan [Train] Station Killer"
- Conviction: Murder x3
- Penalty: Life imprisonment with a possibility of parole after 22 years

Details
- Victims: 3+
- Span of crimes: 28 June 1986 – 16 June 1998
- Country: France
- Date apprehended: 14 October 2014

Jacques Rançon, born on 9 March 1960, is a French rapist and serial killer known as the ‘Perpignan Station Killer’, French: le tueur de la gare de Perpignan. After committing crimes in Perpignan between 1997 and 1998, Jacques Rançon was arrested in 2014. He was sentenced to life imprisonment in March 2018, after being found guilty of the rapes, murders and mutilation, of two young women as well as the attempted murder of a third woman, who was left for dead, and the attempted rape of a fourth. A few months later, he was charged with murdering a 20-year-old student in 1986 in the Somme department and sentenced to a further 30 years in June 2021.

== Biography ==
=== Youth ===
Jacques Rançon was born on 9 March 1960 in Hailles (Somme) to a bricklayer father and an unemployed mother. He had a twin brother who died in April, aged just one month. Rançon was born into a sibling group of 13 children, all of whom, with the exception of Rançon, were placed with the DDASS. He and his late brother were the youngest of the siblings. Rançon grew up in a poverty-stricken environment, where he was teased by his classmates. His mother beat him and his father did nothing to stop the beatings.

In 1970, Rançon was 10 years old when he discovered the existence of one of his sisters, Denise Rançon, born on 21 August 1939 to his father's first marriage. In 1975, at the age of 15, Rançon witnessed his father attempt to assault his wife. The teenager then developed a violent temper and began to drink heavily.

In 1976, at the age of 16, Rançon committed his first sexual assault on a teenage girl, Marie-Line, and tried to strangle her. The girl asked to lodge a complaint against him, but those around her dissuaded her, as Rançon had the reputation of a ‘poor unfortunate’. He was therefore not prosecuted for this misdeed. He admits, however, that his response to women's perception of him is to lose all control and become violent so that his victim submits. Rançon finds work at the Kindy sock factory.

In March 1978, at the age of 18, Rançon passed his driving test. He got his first car that same year and found it his ‘only pleasure’. He then fell into petty car thefts with one of his few friends. Without being bothered in the slightest, the two young men stole up to 48 cars. Rançon's father died in November 1979, aged 72. When he attended the funeral, he was stunned to discover that he had 15 other siblings from his father's first marriage, as well as a twin brother who died when he was just a month old.

In 1981, aged 21, Rançon stole money from a drinks dispenser in the factory where he worked. He was dismissed after breaking into the office of the company accountant. He met his girlfriend in 1986, while frequenting nightclubs. The young woman's name was Carole. They fell in love and immediately set up home near Amiens.

=== First crimes and first conviction for rape ===
==== Murder of Isabelle Mesnage and abduction of Françoise ====
On 28 June 1986, Isabelle Mesnage, a 20-year-old computer science student, was walking in Corbie. At around 2pm, Rançon spotted her and forced her into his car. He drove for several kilometres, holding Isabelle hostage, before stopping on an isolated road in Cachy. He made sexual advances towards her, but she refused. He struck her several times and strangled her to death. He raped her and skinned her body, removing her genitals. He left the corpse on the road. As the temperature was scorching (over 30 degrees), the body decomposed very quickly. Rançon was 26 years old. This was his first known murder. The body was discovered on 3 July, after five days of searching. The autopsy showed that the victim had been sexually assaulted. An investigation was opened into the murder followed by rape, but it led nowhere. The investigation initially focused on the victim's family, neighbours and suspicious persons in her entourage.

Rançon's partner gave birth to a son, David, in 1987. In July, Rançon was driving along in his car when he came across 15-year-old Françoise in the streets of Amiens. He offered to give her a lift home to her parents. She got in, but he didn't stop. He accelerated, but she managed to jump out of the moving vehicle. Unharmed, Françoise ran into Rançon again that evening at a dance. She thought about filing a complaint, but decided against it. She said nothing to her parents, ashamed of having got into her attacker's car.

In 1988, Rançon was hired as a supervisor at the Gedis warehouses in the Moreuil Co-op. His relationship soon fell apart, to the extent that the fire brigade often called at his home on Place Victor-Hugo. Described as impulsive, Jacques used to beat up his partner. In 1991, Rançon's partner became pregnant by him. But because Jacques was violent, she refused to let him acknowledge their second child and decided to leave him. Meanwhile, the investigation into the murder of Isabelle Mesnage, which had been going on for several years, still failed to identify a suspect. The examining magistrate dismissed the case on 26 February 1992.

==== Rape case in Amiens ====
On the night of 19 to 20 June 1992, Rançon approached Nathalie, a 20-year-old secretary, who was returning home in her car after a night out with friends and a nightclub in Amiens. Rançon gave her a fishtail and blocked her on the N25. Armed with a switchblade knife, he forced her into his car, took her down a dirt track to the entrance of a wood and raped her before taking what little money she had. As Nathalie did not resist or try to escape, Rançon let her go. She filed a complaint for rape at gunpoint, naming a Renault Fuego as her attacker's car. Rançon managed to find Nathalie's address and sent her letters. However, he was caught in the act.

He was arrested on 8 July for raping Nathalie and remanded in custody at Amiens prison after 48 hours. This was his first spell in prison. He was recognised by his victim as her rapist, prosecuted for rape committed at gunpoint and referred to the Somme Assize Court. The psychiatric experts found him responsible for his actions, describing him as: ‘curable and re-adaptable’ and ‘not dangerous.

Rançon appeared before the Amiens Assize Court from 25 to 27 January 1994. He was found guilty of rape at gunpoint and sentenced to 8 years' imprisonment. While in Amiens prison, he realised that he still had sexual urges for young women aged around 20. He devised a plan to ensure that his victims could not identify him after they had been attacked.

=== The Perpignan crimes and imprisonment for assault ===
Rançon was released from prison on 6 September 1997, after five years and two months. Aged 37, he moved to a hotel 100 metres from Perpignan station.

On the night of 9 to 10 September, at around midnight, Rançon approached Nadjet Ouatiki, aged 18, on a bridge in Perpignan. He grabbed her by the neck and swung her over the railings onto the lawn. Nadjet screamed and tried to run away, but Rançon tore off her clothes. When he tried to rape her, a car stopped nearby and Rançon run away. Nadjet left the scene unharmed. She reported the rape, but the investigation came to nothing.

On the night of 20–21 December, Rançon spotted a 19-year-old student, Mokhtaria Chaïb, on her way to the Cité Universitaire. He threw himself at her with a knife and took her to a vacant lot near Perpignan station, forcing her to undress. Mokhtaria refused and struggled. He tried to rape her, then mutilated her with a knife. She died of her wounds, and Rançon skinned her genitals. He then took off her shoes to remove any traces of his DNA. Rançon put the severed parts into a plastic bag and took the shoes with him, leaving the rest of the body behind. He then threw the bag into the nearby sewer and the shoes into the garden of a property. The mutilated body was discovered at 8:45 am. An investigation into the murder and acts of torture was opened by the Judicial Police. According to the autopsy, it took at least an hour to remove Mokhtaria's skin: the killer must have been a skilled surgeon, it was concluded. Rançon was not investigated because he had no connection with this profession. Instead, the investigation turned to a 49-year-old Peruvian surgeon, Andrés Palomino-Barrios, convicted of multiple frauds.

Palomino-Barrios was arrested on 22 January 1998 and taken into custody. Although he claimed to have been in Spain at the time of the crime, his neighbours refuted his claim, stating that they had seen him in Perpignan at that time and that he had cleaned his van on the morning the body was discovered. After questioning, Palomino-Barrios was charged with murder and acts of barbarism and remanded in custody.

On the night of 9 March, a kilometre from Perpignan station, Rançon was on his way to Rue de Belfort, following his birthday party. Drunk and stumbling, he came across Sabrina, aged 19. When he tumbled, Sabrina helped him up. He pulled out a knife and stabbed her in the stomach, going up to the sternum. The girl's screams were heard by Sabrina's neighbour, Marie-Line Sandret, who came out of her house. Rançon fled to his hotel, which was less than a kilometre away. Marie-Line Sandret called an ambulance. Narrowly avoiding being killed, Sabrina survived. At the police station, she reported an attempted murder, describing her attacker as "about 40 years old", "blue eyed", "about 1.65 m tall", and "with decayed teeth". The attack, however, was not linked to Chaïb's murder, as the main suspect in that murder, Palomino-Barrios, was in prison at that time. The case was quickly closed.

On 16 June, as Rançon was having a drink at the Terminus bar on the avenue de la gare in Perpignan and was about to leave the brasserie when he saw Marie-Hélène Gonzalez, a 22-year-old student, hitchhiking outside the station at 9 pm. He offered her a lift in his car. She gave him her parents' address, but as with Isabelle Mesnage, Rançon instead drove to a landfill near the station. At knife-point, he told Marie-Hélène to undress. When she refused, he raped her and stabbed her to death before cutting off her genitals and cutting off her head, which he placed in a plastic bag. He left the butchered remains behind and returned to his hotel. The body of Marie-Hélène Gonzalez was discovered on 26 June. DNA tests confirmed that the body was that of the young woman who had been missing for ten days. The police noticed similarities with the murder of Mokhtaria Chaïb: same brown hair, same age group, same mutilations, same location at Perpignan station. Investigators concluded that the same person must have killed both victims, yet Palomino-Barrios, Mokhtaria's presumed killer, was still in prison. The Perpignan Criminal Investigation Department also brought to light the case of Tatiana Andújar, who disappeared on 24 September 1995 as she was leaving the station. Rançon was innocent of this incident, however, as he was in prison at that time. People who lived around Perpignan began to talk about a serial killer. As the "Perpignan station killer" could not be Palomino-Barrios, the Montpellier Indictment Division ordered his release on 13 August 1998. Palomino-Barrios was released on 5 October, having spent eight and a half months in prison, evidently wrongly accused. His case was dismissed in April 2003.

On the night of 28–29 September 1998, Rançon was driving through the streets of Perpignan. He passed Meryl Foulonneau, aged 23, blocking her path with a fishtail. He got out of his car armed with a knife and tried to open the door of the other vehicle, but it had been locked by the young woman, who called her father. Her father arrived at the scene immediately. Rançon became frightened and fled, but the father noted the number plate of Rançon's car. Rançon was eventually arrested on 30 September for the attempted assault the day before, and questioned by the police who were also investigating the Perpignan station murders. He was questioned about the aggravated murder of Marie-Hélène Gonzalez, with Rançon claiming that he did not know her and that he had learned of her death from his partner and one of her friends. His home was searched, but no evidence was found. His additional charge for the murder of Marie-Hélène Gonzalez was, therefore, dropped. Rançon was thus charged only with the attempted assault and remanded in custody. Rançon appeared before the Perpignan Criminal Court in November and was sentenced to one year's imprisonment. While he was in custody, Marie-Hélène Gonzalez's head was found near the landfill near the railway station.

=== Sexual assault in Amiens and third prison sentence ===
Rançon was released on 29 June 1999, after nine months in prison. He then moved to Amiens.

On the night of 22 August, having been free for a few weeks, Rançon approached Virginie, aged 23, on a bench in Place René Goblet, in the centre of Amiens, and asked her for a cigarette. He threw himself on top of her and began to strangle her, causing her to lose consciousness. He carried her to his car and started it up, but she quickly regained consciousness. Frightened, he stopped and let her go. She reported the assault at the Amiens police station, providing her attacker's number plate. The car belonged to Rançon.

Rançon was arrested the next day, 23 August, and remanded in custody for sexual assault with violence and strangulation. He was transferred to Amiens prison, narrowly avoiding having his DNA recorded in the Fichier national automatisé des empreintes génétiques (Automated National DNA Fingerprint Database) because the system had not yet been installed throughout France. On 14 November 2000, he appeared before the Amiens Criminal Court on a charge of sexual assault involving strangulation and was found guilty and sentenced to 5 years' imprisonment. He served his sentence in Amiens prison.

=== Family life and conviction for harassment and death threats ===
Rançon was released from prison on 4 January 2003, after more than three years in detention. He moved back to Perpignan and worked as a forklift driver and storekeeper. In 2004, at the age of 44, Rançon met Lolita, aged 15 and a half. They fell in love and moved in together in 2005. The couple had two children, in 2006 and 2009.

On 23 March 2009, Rançon and Lolita signed a civil partnership agreement (Pacs). He was 49, she 20. Rançon lives peacefully with his partner, his son and his daughter, whom he describes as ‘the most beautiful of roses’. Then the couple's relationship deteriorated sharply. He became violent and impulsive again, as he had been with his first partners. Lolita left Rançon in 2012, who beat her. Rançon harassed her by phone, threatening to kill her. Terrified, she filed a complaint.

Jacques Rançon was arrested at his home on 12 September 2012 and charged with harassment and making death threats against his ex-girlfriend. He was released under judicial supervision and his DNA was taken and recorded in the National Automated DNA File. He was banned from seeing Lolita and her children. On 21 February 2013, Lolita broke off the civil partnership signed with Rançon. Rançon appeared before the Perpignan Criminal Court on 4 October 2013 and was sentenced to one year's imprisonment. He was then detained in Perpignan prison.

Rançon was released from prison on 12 July 2014, after nine months in detention. He returned to live in Perpignan. He was made redundant from his job as a forklift operator and storekeeper, and received benefits. He was 54 years old at the time. In the meantime, the Perpignan Station Murders case made headway and partial DNA was discovered on the shoe of Chaïb, who was killed in 1997, almost 16 years after the events. On 10 October, the DNA found on Mokhtaria Chaïb's shoe was identified as that of Rançon thanks to new software that cross-checks partial DNAs with full DNAs, since he was registered in the National Automated DNA File.

=== Arrest, indictments and pre-trial detention ===
Rançon was arrested on 14 October 2014 at his home and taken into police custody for the aggravated murder of Chaïb. When questioned by the police, he declared that he had never killed anyone and that he did not understand how his DNA could have appeared on her shoe. He was held in police custody for two days without confessing. His criminal record was examined: he had been convicted of rape, was living in Perpignan at the time of the events and had been questioned at the time. Rançon was therefore a serious suspect. He was taken to the scene of Mokhtaria's murder. He described the type of women he liked as ‘pretty brunettes with big breasts’. On 16 October, at his seventh hearing, Rançon confessed to killing Mokhtaria Chaïb. He recounted in detail the rainy night, Mokhtaria's leather jacket and the fact that he had approached her to ‘make love to her’. He killed her because she started screaming. He described butchering her and throwing the pieces down the drain so that his DNA would not be found. Rançon was then described as a ‘sex maniac’. On the evening of 16 October, at the end of his police custody, Rançon was charged with murder followed by acts of torture and barbarism. He was remanded in custody at Béziers Prison. This event made the headlines, as it marked the resolution of a 17-year-old cold case.

A photograph of Rançon was published in the newspapers and Sabrina, who had survived a murder attempt, recognised him as the man who had tried to kill her in 1998. She contacted the Perpignan Criminal Investigation Department and lodged a complaint against Rançon, who was now in prison. In October 2014, Sabrina's attempted murder had exceeded the statute of limitations - 10 years until 2017 - since the case was closed in February 2009. The statute of limitations was broken, however, when the investigating judge decided to link the Sabrina case to the Mokhtaria case in the same file in June 2015. The Perpignan Criminal Investigation Department also suspected Rançon of killing Marie-Hélène Gonzalez, less than six months after Mokhtaria, because the victims had suffered the same abuse.

On 4 June 2015, Rançon was taken into police custody in connection with the attempted murder of Sabrina. He confessed to trying to kill her, but said he had done so while drunk. He was charged with attempted murder and returned to Béziers prison the following day. On 9 June, Rançon was again released from Béziers Prison in connection with the aggravated murder of Marie-Hélène Gonzalez. His lawyer, Xavier Capelet, asked him to tell the truth and he confessed in detail to the murder and rape. He was again charged with rape followed by murder and returned to Béziers prison. While in prison, on 18 June, Rançon also confessed to the attempted rape of Nadjet Ouatiki, stating that he ‘wanted to make love to her’. As the statute of limitations had expired, Rançon could no longer be charged. Once again, the statute of limitations had run out, as the Nadjet case had also been added to the Perpignan crime files. This was Rançon's fourth charge.

He re-enacts the murder of Marie-Hélène Gonzalez on 26 June, during a crime reconstruction. He threw himself at the mannequin representing Marie-Hélène, but claimed to be convinced that he had cut off his victim's feet, stating that he had caught his hair in thorn bushes. These statements were recorded, but were not consistent with the murder of Marie-Hélène Gonzalez, as there had never been any thorn trees. Under investigation, Rançon spent three years and five months in pre-trial detention before being referred to the Pyrénées-Orientales Assize Court for two murders followed by rape, both accompanied by ‘acts of torture and barbarism’, then an attempted murder, as well as an attempted rape in a ‘state of legal recidivism’.

=== Judgement in the Perpignan crimes ===
The trial began on 5 March 2018, before the Perpignan Assize Court (Pyrénées-Orientales). Rançon appeared tired, withdrawn and ‘physically devastated’, having put on weight during his time in custody. The newspapers also wrote that Rançon appeared to be around 65–70 years old, whereas he was barely 58; he celebrated his 58th birthday during the trial.

During the first few days, Rançon said little or nothing. The first victim to testify was Nadjet Ouatiki. She said that at the time she was preparing a cookery CAP and that she was walking along a road when Rançon approached her and pushed her into a ditch, even though he had been free for just four days and had just moved to Perpignan. Rançon repeated his confession to the murders of Mokhtaria Chaïb and Marie-Hélène Gonzalez. He again declared that he wanted to ‘make love’ to his victims, without mentioning rape. The psychiatric experts described him as ‘showing signs of perverse and sadistic deviance, but without any psychiatric pathology’. Rançon was therefore responsible for his actions.

On 12 March, he expressed apologies to his victims and their families. He said: "Moktaria and Marie-Hélène should not have died. What I did was very serious". However, the families did not believe the sincerity of his apology, convinced that he was trying to ‘keep up appearances’. On 14 March, Marie-Hélène Gonzalez's two brothers, who had been present on the civil parties' bench since the opening of the proceedings, rushed towards Rançon's glassed-in box; one of them put his hand through an opening and tried to grab him by the neck, before being belted by the police. Inside the box, three other police officers protected Rançon. Sabrina, the victim who survived an attempted murder, took the stand on 15 March, describing Rançon as ‘evil incarnate’. She said that she had always promised herself that she would recognise the face of the man who had attempted to kill her. In the end, she broke down in tears and screamed, suspending the hearing until the following day.

Rançon's very first victim, whom he sexually assaulted when she was 16, was also present. He expressed neither regret nor apology towards her. The Assize Court retraced Rançon's family history, in which he grew up in a very disadvantaged environment, according to all the experts: psychiatrists, psychologists and personality investigators. It also referred to the fact that Rançon described himself as ‘the unfortunate kid in the village’, a ‘poor kid’, ‘badly dressed’, with whom the other children did not want to play.

On 22 March, the public prosecutor, Luc-André Lenormand, raised doubts about Rançon's other potential victims and spoke of an ‘enormous risk of recidivism’. He mentioned a Finnish student found dead in 1982, in the same position as Mokhtaria Chaïb. He also recalled what Rançon had said about Marie-Hélène Gonzalez, claiming that her feet had been cut off, which did not tally with the forensic doctor's findings. Mr Lenormand requested life imprisonment with a 22-year sentence. At the end of the trial, on 26 March, Rançon was sentenced to life imprisonment, plus a period of probation of 22 years.

=== Indictment for the murder of Isabelle Mesnage ===
In April 2018, the Amiens public prosecutor's office requested an investigation against Rançon for the murder of Isabelle Mesnage in 1986, at the instigation of lawyers Corinne Herrmann and Didier Seban, specialists in solving ‘cold cases’. It is based on the photograph of the crime scene when Isabelle Mesnage's body was discovered, the dismemberment of the victim's genitals being similar to the Perpignan cases, as well as her age and the thorny issues mentioned by Rançon during the reconstruction of the murder of Marie-Hélène Gonzalez. The application to reopen the investigation was filed on 21 April. For the third time in Rançon's case, the statute of limitations - which was extended to 20 years in 2017 - had been exceeded since the maximum date, 26 February 2012. Once again, this investigation led to the cancellation of the statute of limitations and the reopening of the judicial investigation on 1 October 2018.

Incarcerated in Béziers prison, Rançon was taken from his cell on 18 June 2019 and placed in police custody for the murder of Isabelle Mesnage. He did not want the assistance of a lawyer and initially denied the charges against him. After 40 hours, he confessed to the crime, saying that he had abducted Isabelle Mesnage on the day she disappeared while she was hitchhiking. He admitted that he had hit her, then raped her before strangling her. He claimed that this was ‘his very first murder’ and that ‘there are no other homicide victims other than the three identified to date’. He was charged with murder and rape and returned to Béziers prison, where he served his life sentence.

Four months later, on 18 October, Rançon sent a letter in which he retracted his accusation that he had murdered Isabelle Mesnage and stated that he had never seen the young girl. His lawyer, Xavier Capelet, backed up his statements, insisting that the investigation and autopsies at the time had not revealed any mutilation; he also insisted that the experts did not agree on the interpretation to be given to the few traces that were visible today, and mocked ‘the intuition of a lawyer who apparently has “clairvoyant gifts”’.

During the investigation, a new woman stated that she had been abducted by Rançon in 1987 in the streets of Amiens. This was Françoise, another surviving victim, who managed to escape by jumping out of Rançon's moving car. However, he could no longer be prosecuted for the kidnapping, which was merely an offence that could not be grouped with murder. In January 2021, Rançon was brought before the Somme Assize Court for the rape and subsequent murder of Isabelle Mesnage. He has now been in prison for more than six years.

=== Judgement in the Mesnage case ===
==== First instance ====
Rançon's trial began on 8 June 2021, before the Amiens Assize Court (Somme). He was 61 years old at the time. On the first day, he denied any accusation of murder, saying: "I didn't kill Isabelle Mesnage. I was in solitary confinement for 6 and a half years. I did nothing, I just watched TV. All the inmates insulted me". Lawyer Corinne Herrmann, who attended the trial, said: ‘I've been working on serial killers for 25 years and I've never seen this type of injury on any victims other than those in Perpignan and Isabelle Mesnage’.

Françoise, aged 49, testified on 9 June that she had been abducted when she was 15. Nathalie also testified about the rape she had suffered in 1992, for which Rançon had been convicted by the same Assize Court twenty-seven years earlier. The trial was also based on the fact that Isabelle Mesnage's murder bore strong similarities to another, committed in 1985, whose victim's body had been found in the Couture woods, with a bloodied stick nearby. It could have been one of Rançon's crimes.

Rançon stated unemotionally that his parents did not love him. He described a father who took no interest in him and an intellectually deficient mother who sometimes beat him with a stick. Rançon said he was convinced that his life ‘would have been better’ if he too had been placed in care. On 12 June, Rançon was sentenced to 30 years' imprisonment with a 20-year security period. Challenging the verdict, he appealed against his conviction.

=== Appeal trial ===
Rançon appeared on appeal on 20 June 2022 before the Laon Assize Court (Aisne), having lost around thirty kilos and with a weak voice. He still denies involvement in the murder of Isabelle Mesnage. However, he admitted to the murders of Chaïb and Gonzalez, for which he had already been convicted four years earlier.

He was again defended by Xavier Capelet, and both hoped for acquittal. The lawyer said: ‘When Jacques Rançon is innocent, he says so, and when he is guilty, he says so too, so I have no reason not to believe him, but I don't think there is any evidence in the case to be very positive’. The Mesnage family's lawyers, Corinne Herrmann and Didier Seban, asked the Paris cold cases unit to bring to light other unsolved homicide cases, convinced that Jacques Rançon may have committed other murders in the 1980s and 1990s. During the five-day trial, the public prosecutor, André Meykuchel, revealed that Rançon ‘inevitably had to be tried again’ for the aggravated murder of Isabelle Mesnage, because Rançon's sentence of 30 years' imprisonment with 20 years' security was ‘illegal’, as it was not applicable at the time of the events.

Rançon still maintains his innocence: "What do you want me to say? That I'll kill them all, every time! I know in advance that I'll get 30 years. Mademoiselle Mesnage, I didn't do it and we'll never know the truth! You're getting on my nerves with your stupid questions and I don't feel like answering any more". The public prosecutor requested a sentence of life imprisonment with 18 years' security, taking into account the female genital mutilation performed on Isabelle Mesnage and the risk of the accused reoffending.

On 24 June, Rançon was sentenced to life imprisonment with an 18-year security period. Recognised as a serial killer, he became one of the rare criminals to be sentenced more than once to life imprisonment. He will be eligible for parole from 2036, when his 22-year sentence expires.

== In media ==
=== Television ===
In the French true crime television series, The Lost Station Girls, released on 8 October 2025 on Disney+'s Hulu hub, Jacques Rançon is portrayed by Ludovic Berthillot.

== See also ==
- List of French serial killers
