= Bram station =

Railway station in Bram, France

Coordinates: 43°14′37″N 2°07′09″E

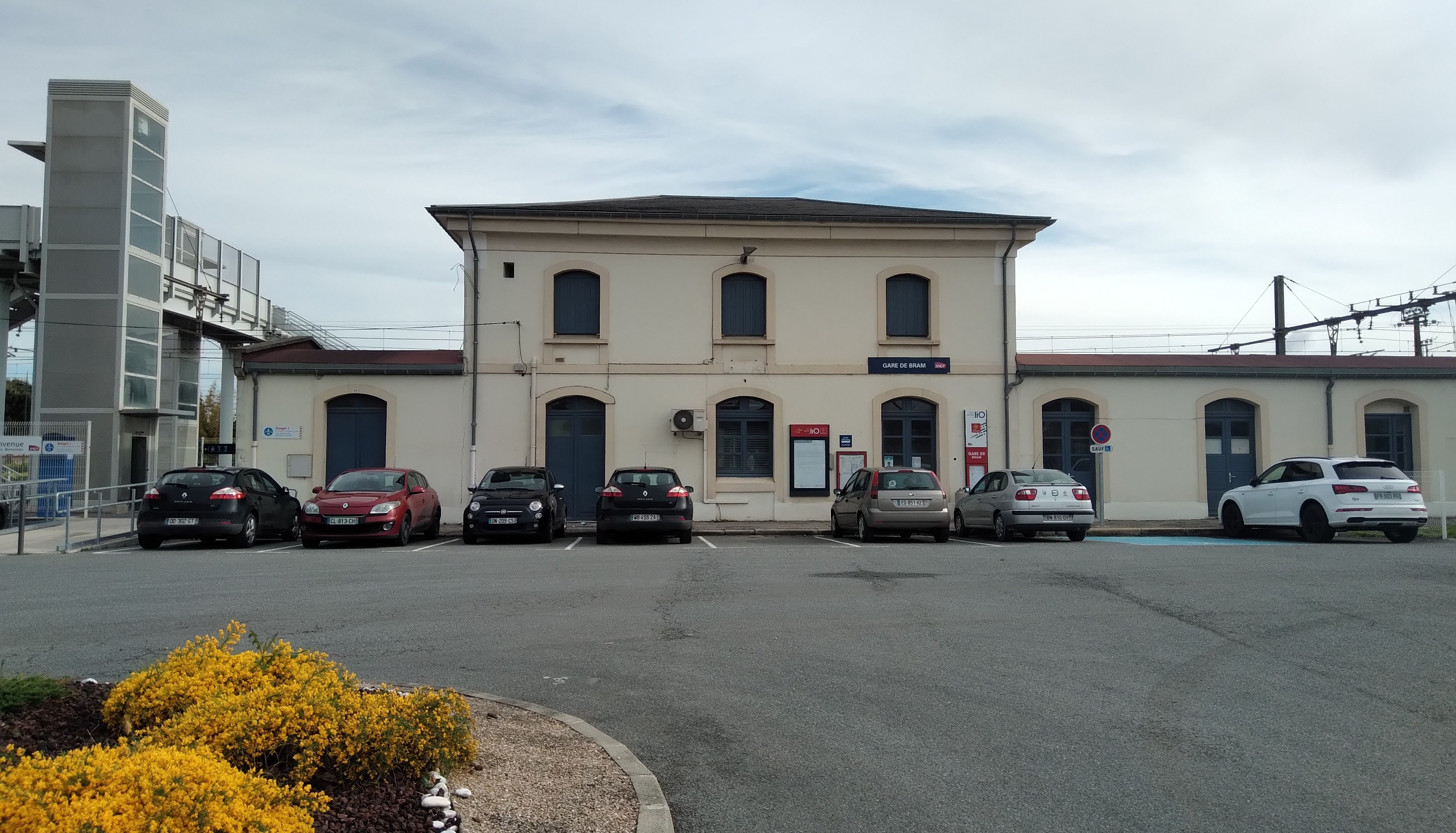

Bram is a railway station in Bram, Occitanie, France. The station is on the Bordeaux–Sète railway line. The station is served by TER (local) services operated by the SNCF.

== Train services ==
The following services currently call at Bram:

- local service (TER Occitanie) Toulouse–Carcassonne–Narbonne

Preceding station	TER Occitanie	Following station
Castelnaudary towards Toulouse	10	Carcassonne towards Narbonne
Carcassonne towards Portbou	25	Castelnaudary towards Toulouse
