= Narbonne–Portbou railway =

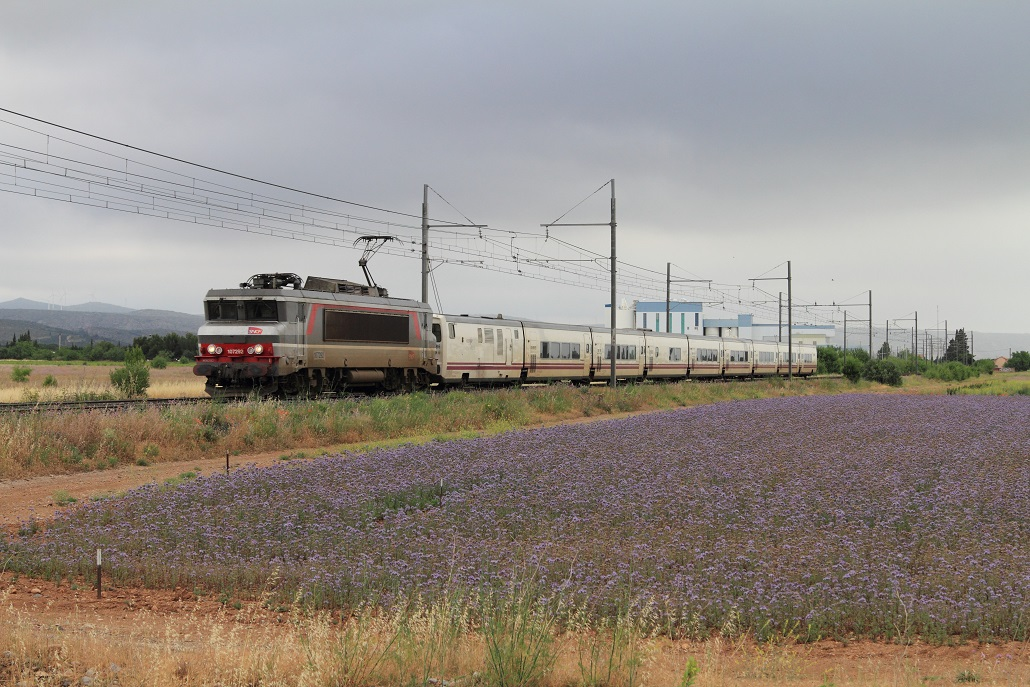

Overview
- Status: Operational
- Owner: SNCF Réseau
- Locale: France (Occitania), Spain (Catalonia)
- Termini: Narbonne station; Portbou railway station

Service
- System: SNCF
- Operator(s): SNCF

History
- Opened: 1858-1878

Technical
- Line length: 104 km (65 mi)
- Number of tracks: Double track
- Track gauge: 1,435 mm (4 ft 8 1/2 in) standard gauge
- Electrification: 1.5 kV DC

The Narbonne—Portbou railway is an important 104-kilometre long railway line that connects the city of Narbonne, France to northeastern Spain. The railway was built by the Compagnie des Chemins de fer du Midi. The first section that was opened in 1858 led from Narbonne to Perpignan. The line was extended to the Spanish border town Portbou in 1878.

== Route ==
The Narbonne–Portbou railway leaves the Bordeaux–Sète railway in Narbonne towards the south. It runs close to the Mediterranean coast for much of its length. South of Perpignan the new high-speed rail to Figueres branches off. The Narbonne–Portbou railway crosses the Spanish border between Cerbère and Portbou, where the railway ends. France and Spain have different rail gauges (standard gauge and Iberian gauge, resp.), which requires change of trains. The section between Cerbère and Portbou has tracks with both gauges.

=== Main stations ===
The main stations on the Narbonne–Portbou railway are:

- Narbonne station
- Perpignan station
- Cerbère station
- Portbou railway station

== Services ==
The Narbonne–Portbou railway is used by the following passenger services:

- TGV from Paris to Barcelona on the section between Narbonne and Perpignan
- AVE from Barcelona to Toulouse or Lyon, and from Madrid to Marseille on the section between Narbonne and Perpignan
- Intercités from Paris to Portbou via Toulouse on the whole line
- TER Occitanie regional services on the whole line
