= Avignonet station =

Railway station in Avignonet-Lauragais, France

Avignonet
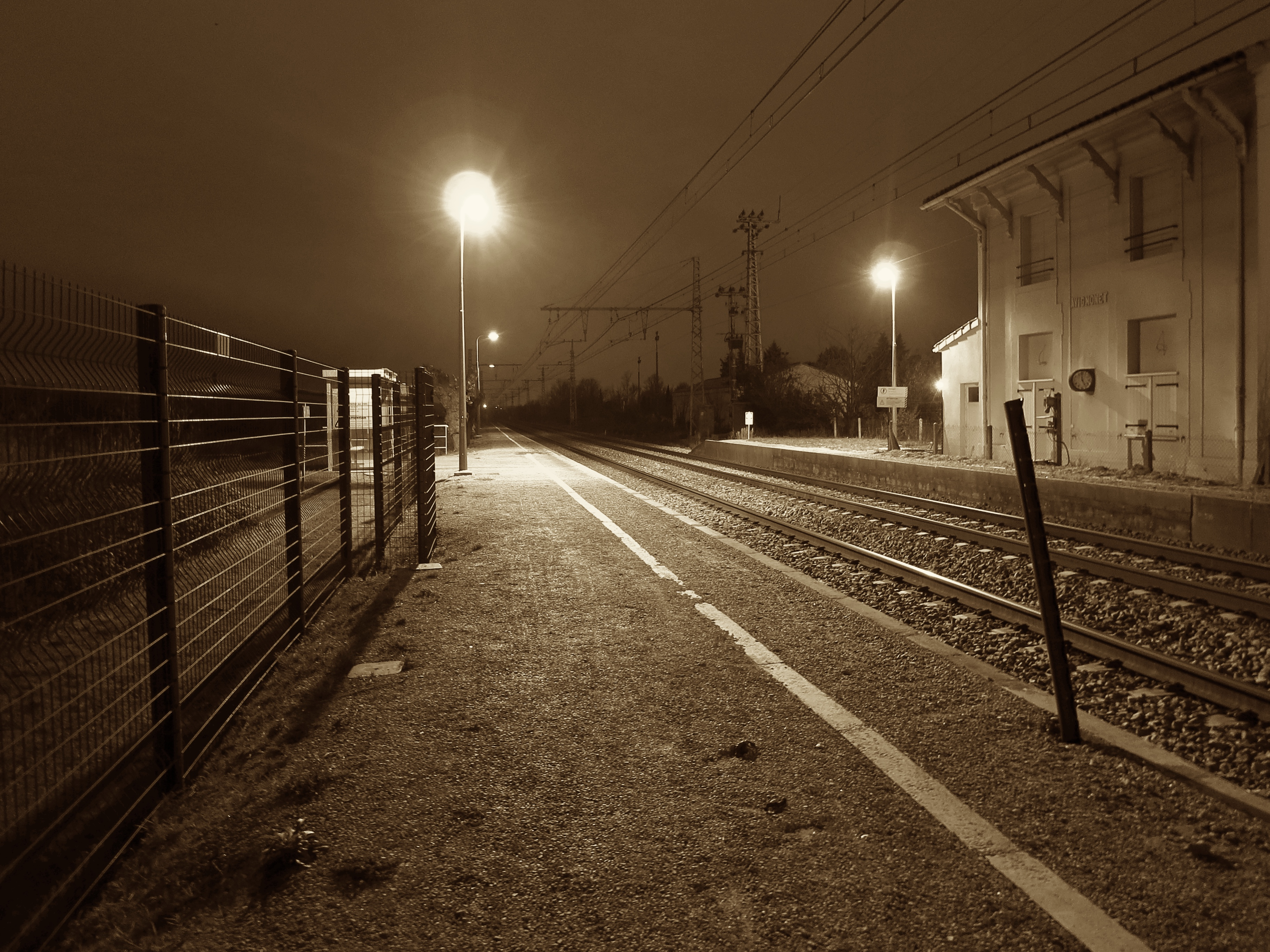
- Gare d'Avignonet

General information
- Location: Avignonet, Occitanie, France
- Coordinates: 43.36381°N 1.78772°E
- Line: Bordeaux–Sète railway

Services
Preceding station	TER Occitanie	Following station
Villefranche-de-Lauragais towards Toulouse	10	Castelnaudary towards Narbonne
Location

Avignonet is a railway station in Avignonet, Occitanie, southern France. Within TER Occitanie, it is part of line 10 (Toulouse–Narbonne).
