= Perpignan station =

Railway station in Occitania, France

Perpignan
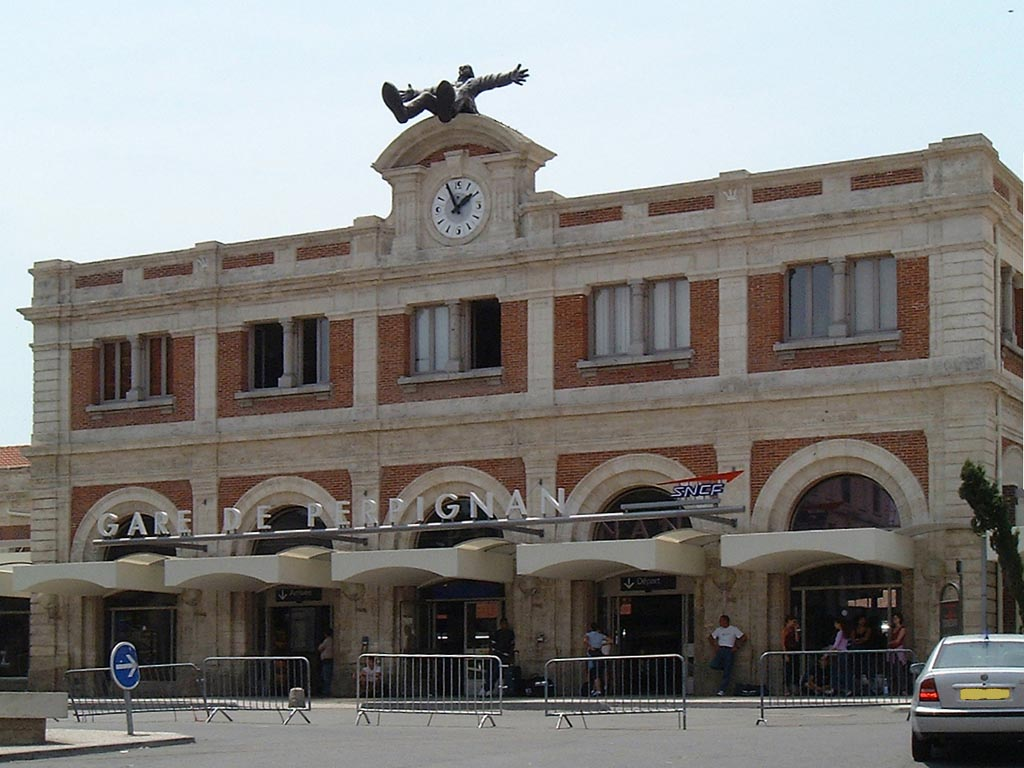
- Perpignan station

General information
- Location: 1 place Salvador-Dalí; 66000 Perpignan; Pyrénées-Orientales; France
- Coordinates: 42.6965°N 2.8799°E
- Owner: SNCF
- Operator: SNCF
- Lines: Narbonne–Portbou railway; LGV Perpignan–Figueres; Perpignan–Villefranche-de-Conflent railway
- Platforms: 4
- Tracks: 6

Construction
- Structure type: Ground
- Parking: Yes (at Parking Perpignan Centre Del Mon–EFFIA)

Other information
- Station code: 87784009

History
- Opened: 12 July 1858

Passengers
- 2024: 2,053,794
Services
Preceding station	SNCF	Following station
Narbonne towards Paris-Lyon	TGV inOui	Terminus
Narbonne towards Paris-Lyon	TGV inOui	Figueres–Vilafant towards Barcelona Sants
Rivesaltes towards Paris-Austerlitz	Intercités (night)	Elne towards Cerbère
Preceding station	Renfe Operadora	Following station
Narbonne towards Lyon-Part-Dieu	AVE	Figueres–Vilafant towards Barcelona Sants
Carcassonne towards Toulouse-Matabiau	AVE	Figueres–Vilafant towards Barcelona Sants
Narbonne towards Marseille-St-Charles	AVE	Figueres–Vilafant towards Madrid Puerta de Atocha
Preceding station	TER Occitanie	Following station
Cerbère towards Portbou	22	Narbonne towards Avignon-Centre
Elne towards Portbou	23	Rivesaltes towards Narbonne
Le Soler towards Villefranche–Vernet-les-Bains	24	Terminus
Elne towards Portbou	25	Rivesaltes towards Toulouse
Location

Perpignan station (French: Gare de Perpignan) is the railway station serving the city of Perpignan, Pyrénées-Orientales department, Occitanie, southern France. Part of the station was decorated in the style of Salvador Dalí, for whom the place held special significance, having proclaimed it to be the "Centre of the Universe" after experiencing a vision of cosmogonic ecstasy there in 1963 and made a painting called La Gare de Perpignan in 1965.

The station opened in 1858 and is located on the Narbonne–Portbou railway, LGV Perpignan–Figueres and Perpignan–Villefranche-de-Conflent railway. The station is served by TGV, Intercités and TER services operated by SNCF. It is also served by the Spanish AVE high-speed service operated by Renfe with trains to Barcelona and Madrid.

== Train services ==
The following services currently call at Perpignan:

- High speed services (TGV) Paris–Nîmes–Montpellier–Béziers–Perpignan–Barcelona
- High speed services (TGV) Paris–Nîmes–Montpellier–Béziers–Perpignan
- High speed services (AVE) Lyon–Nîmes–Montpellier–Béziers–Perpignan–Barcelona
- High speed services (TGV) Toulouse–Carcassonne–Perpignan–Barcelona
- High speed services (AVE) Marseille–Nîmes–Montpellier–Béziers–Perpignan–Barcelona–Madrid
- Night services (Intercités de nuit) Paris–Carcassonne–Narbonne–Cerbère
- Express service (TER Occitanie) Portbou–Cerbère–Perpignan–Narbonne–Béziers–Montpellier–Nîmes–Avignon
- Local service (TER Occitanie) Portbou–Cerbère–Perpignan–Narbonne–Toulouse
- Local service (TER Occitanie) Villefranche-Vernet-les-Bains–Perpignan

== See also ==
- Gare de Perpignan murders
- List of SNCF stations in Occitanie
