= Carcassonne station =

Railway station in Occitanie, France

Carcassonne
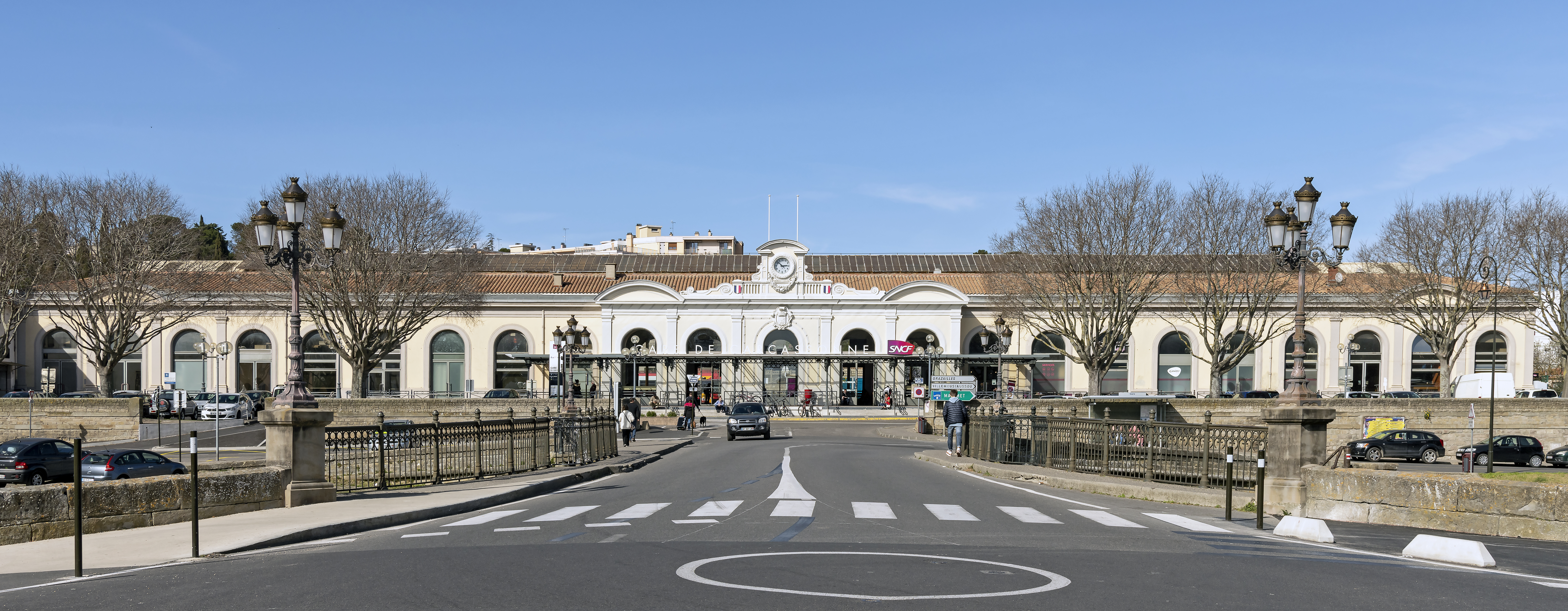
- Gare de Carcassonne

General information
- Location: 1 Avenue Maréchal Joffre; 11000 Carcassonne France
- Coordinates: 43.218182°N 2.351826°E
- Owner: RFF / SNCF
- Lines: Bordeaux–Sète railway Carcassonne–Rivesaltes

Other information
- Station code: 87615286

History
- Opened: 22 April 1857

Passengers
- 2024: 1,248,583
Services
Preceding station	SNCF	Following station
Toulouse Terminus	TGV inOui	Narbonne towards Lyon-Part-Dieu
Toulouse towards Bordeaux	Intercités	Narbonne towards Marseille
Castelnaudary towards Paris-Austerlitz	Intercités (night)	Lézignan-Corbières towards Cerbère
Preceding station	TER Occitanie	Following station
Bram towards Toulouse	10	Lézignan-Corbières towards Narbonne
Lézignan-Corbières towards Portbou	25	Bram towards Toulouse
Terminus	29	Couffoulens-Leuc towards Limoux
Location

Carcassonne is a railway station in Carcassonne, Occitanie, France, on the Bordeaux–Sète and Carcassonne–Rivesaltes lines. The station is served by TGV, Intercités and TER services operated by SNCF.

== History ==
The station built in 1857 by the Railway Company du Midi is located to the north of the ville basse near the Canal du Midi and extended when the Compagnie du Midi opened a second line with the stretch from Carcassonne to Limoux on 15 July 1876, which was extended to Quillan 1 July 1878.

== Architecture ==
The main building is in the classical style and flanked by two wings and a clock. The station hall is decorated with a fresco (8m x 3m) installed in 1995 the painter Jean Camberoque representing the land of the Aude. The Station Buffet features a mural painted in 1996 representing the actor Philippe Noiret waiting for the train on the station platform.

== Train services ==
The following services currently call at Carcassonne:

- High speed services (TGV) Toulouse–Montpellier–Lyon
- Intercity services (Intercités) Bordeaux–Toulouse–Montpellier–Marseille
- Night services (Intercités) Paris–Narbonne–Cerbère
- Regional service (TER Occitanie) Toulouse–Carcassonne–Narbonne
- Local service (TER Occitanie) Carcassonne–Limoux

== Gallery ==
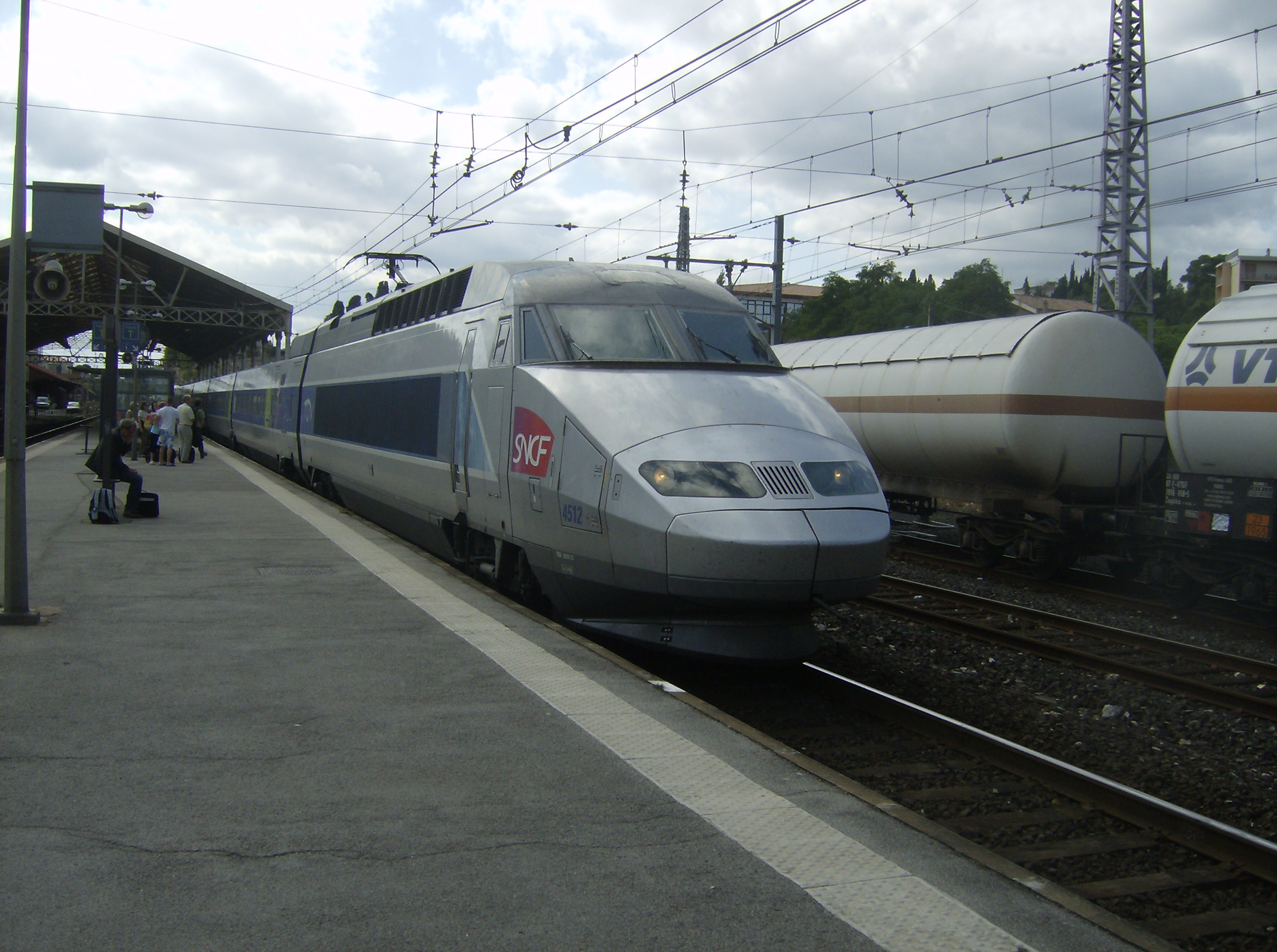
A TGV service to Eastern France

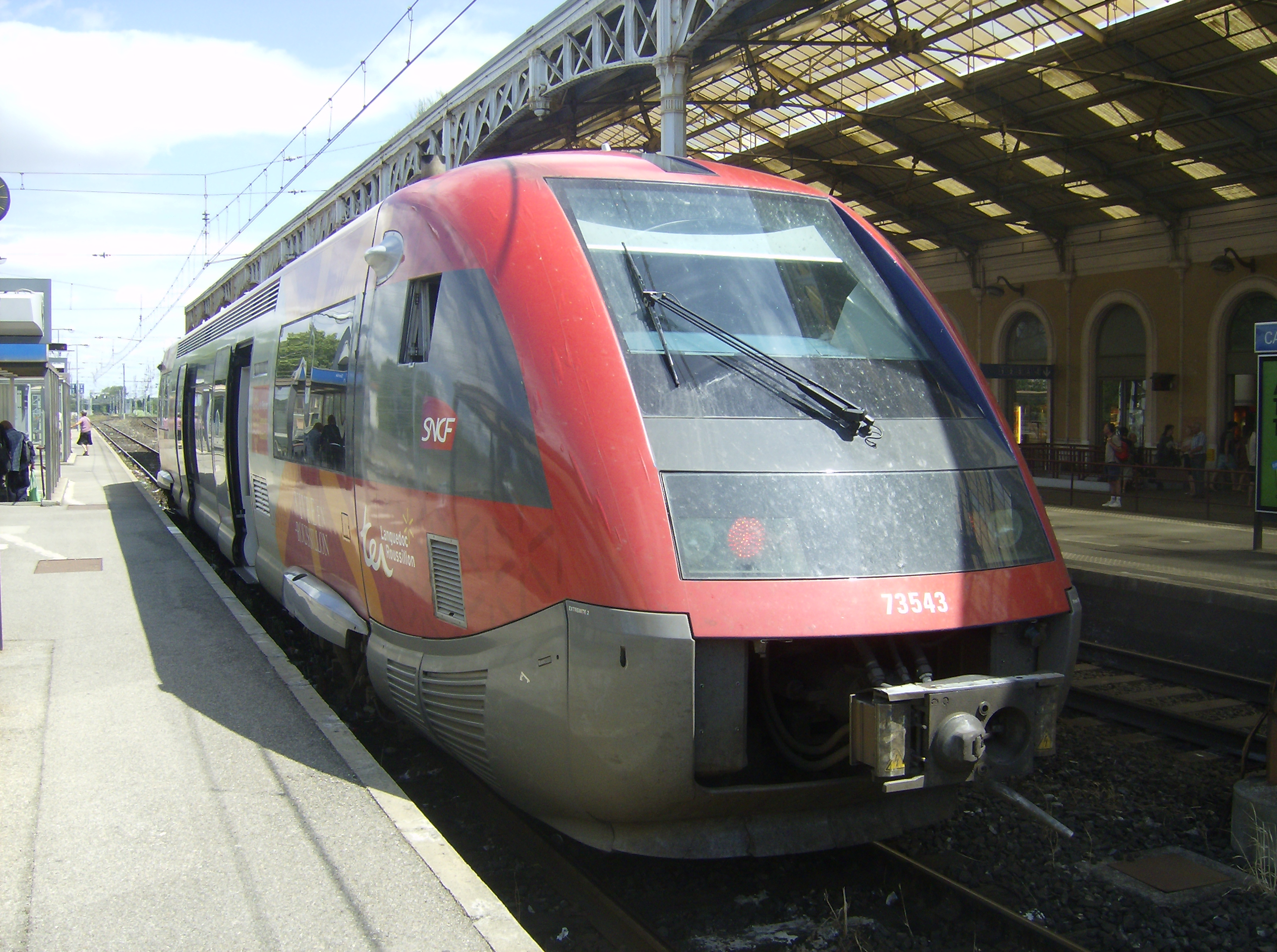
A TER train to Quillan waiting in the station

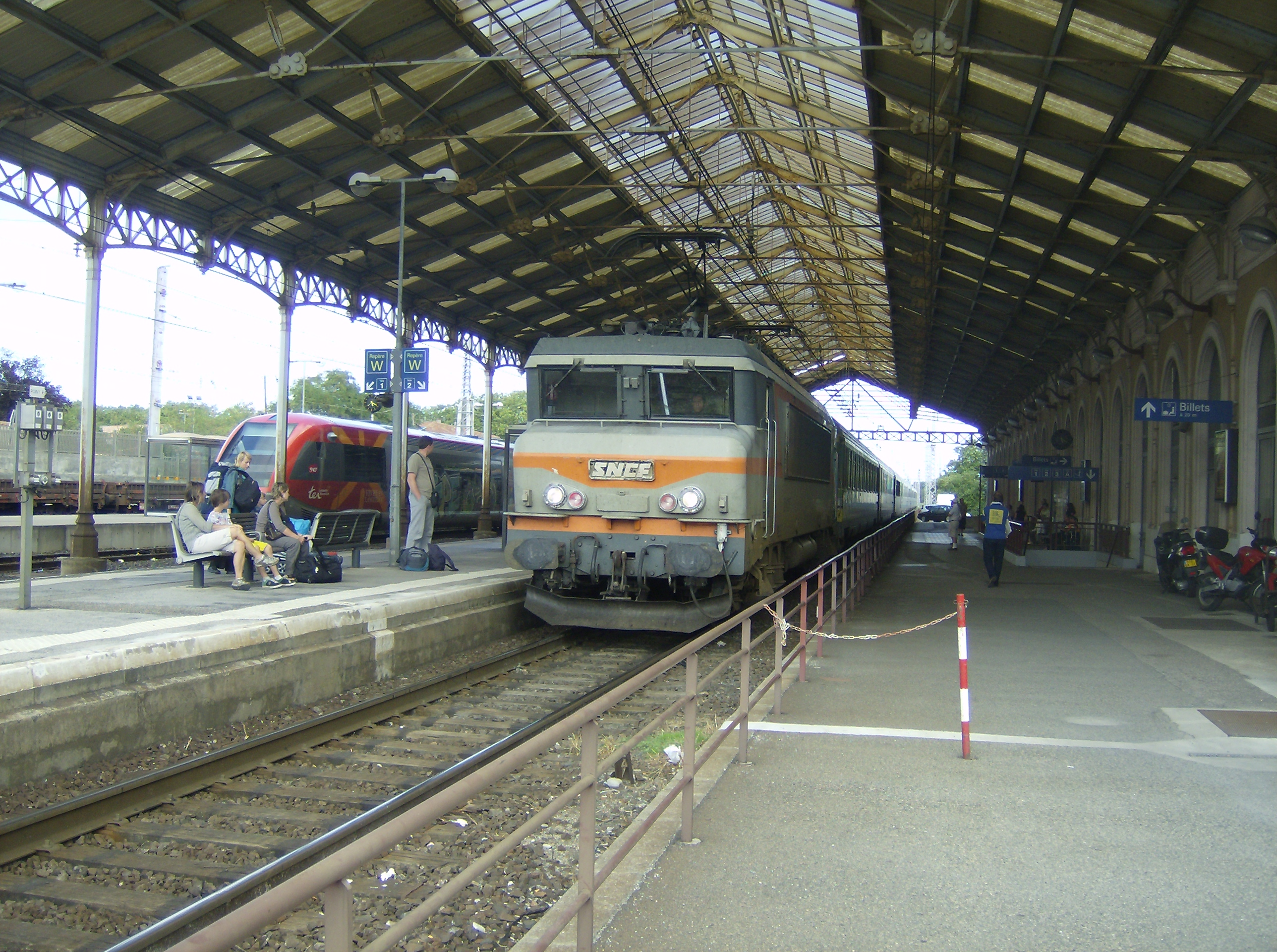
A Train passing through the station
