= Baziège =

- Commune
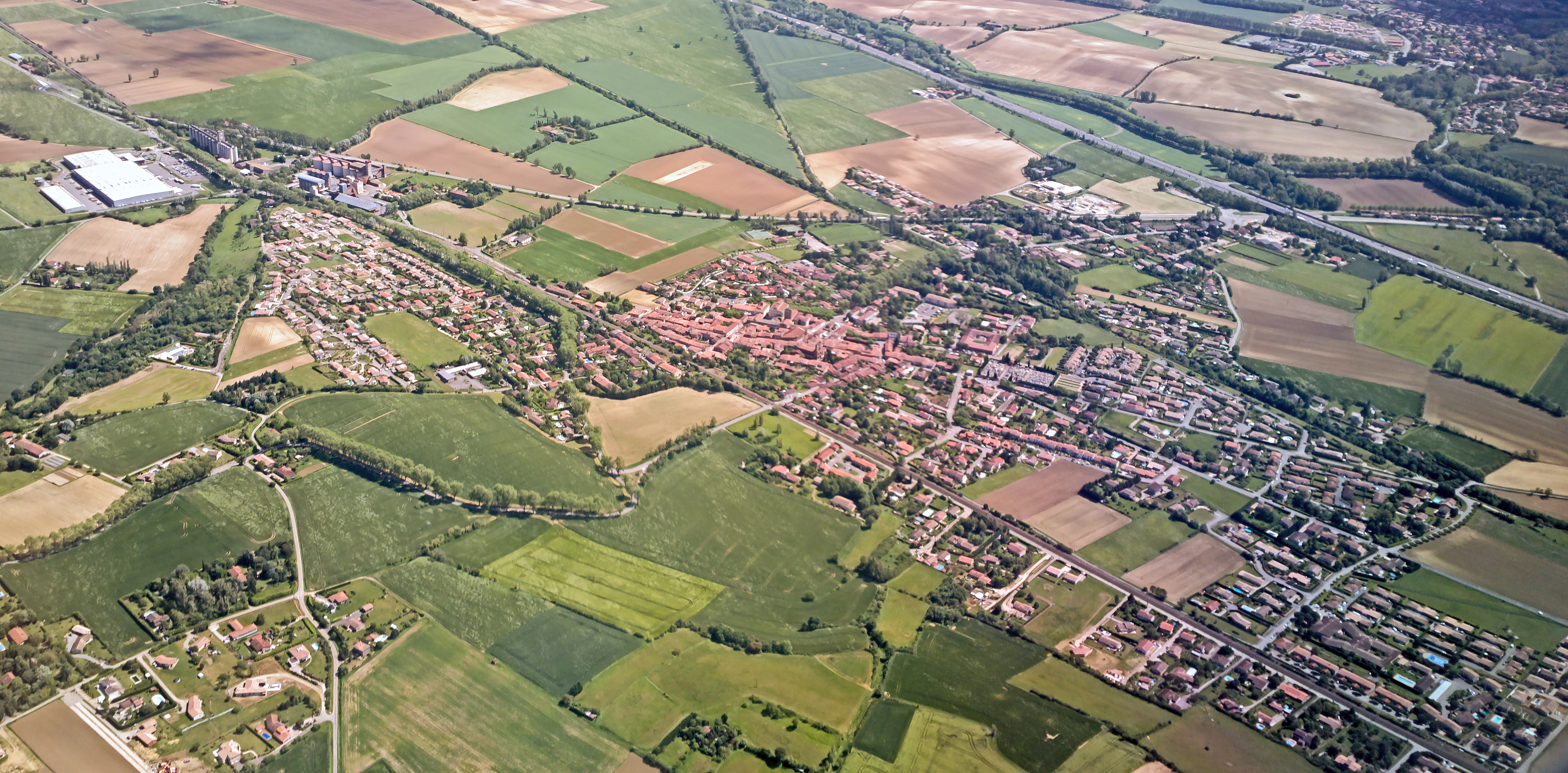
- An aerial view of Baziège

- Coat of arms
- Location of Baziège
- Location within France Location within Occitanie
- Coordinates: 43°27′19″N 1°36′58″E
- Country: France
- Region: Occitania
- Department: Haute-Garonne
- Arrondissement: Toulouse
- Canton: Escalquens
- Intercommunality: CA Sicoval

Government
  - Mayor (2020–2026): Jean Roussel
- Area^{1}: 19.72 km^{2} (7.61 sq mi)
- Elevation: 180 m (590 ft)
- Highest elevation: 253 m (830 ft)
- Lowest elevation: 156 m (512 ft)
- Population (2023): 3,583
  - Density: 181.7/km^{2} (470.6/sq mi)
- Time zone: UTC+01:00 (CET)
  - Summer (DST): UTC+02:00 (CEST)
- INSEE/Postal code: 31048 /31450
- ^{1} French Land Register data, which excludes lakes, ponds, glaciers > 1 km^{2} (0.386 sq mi or 247 acres) and river estuaries.

Baziège (French pronunciation: [bazjɛʒ]; Occitan: Basièja) is a commune in the Haute-Garonne department in southwestern France. Baziège station has rail connections to Toulouse, Carcassonne and Narbonne.

== Population ==
Historical population
Year	Pop.	±% p.a.
1968	1,194	—
1975	1,280	+1.00%
1982	1,648	+3.68%
1990	1,874	+1.62%
1999	2,196	+1.78%
2007	3,082	+4.33%
2012	3,188	+0.68%
2017	3,346	+0.97%
2023	3,583	+1.15%
Source: INSEE

== Monument ==
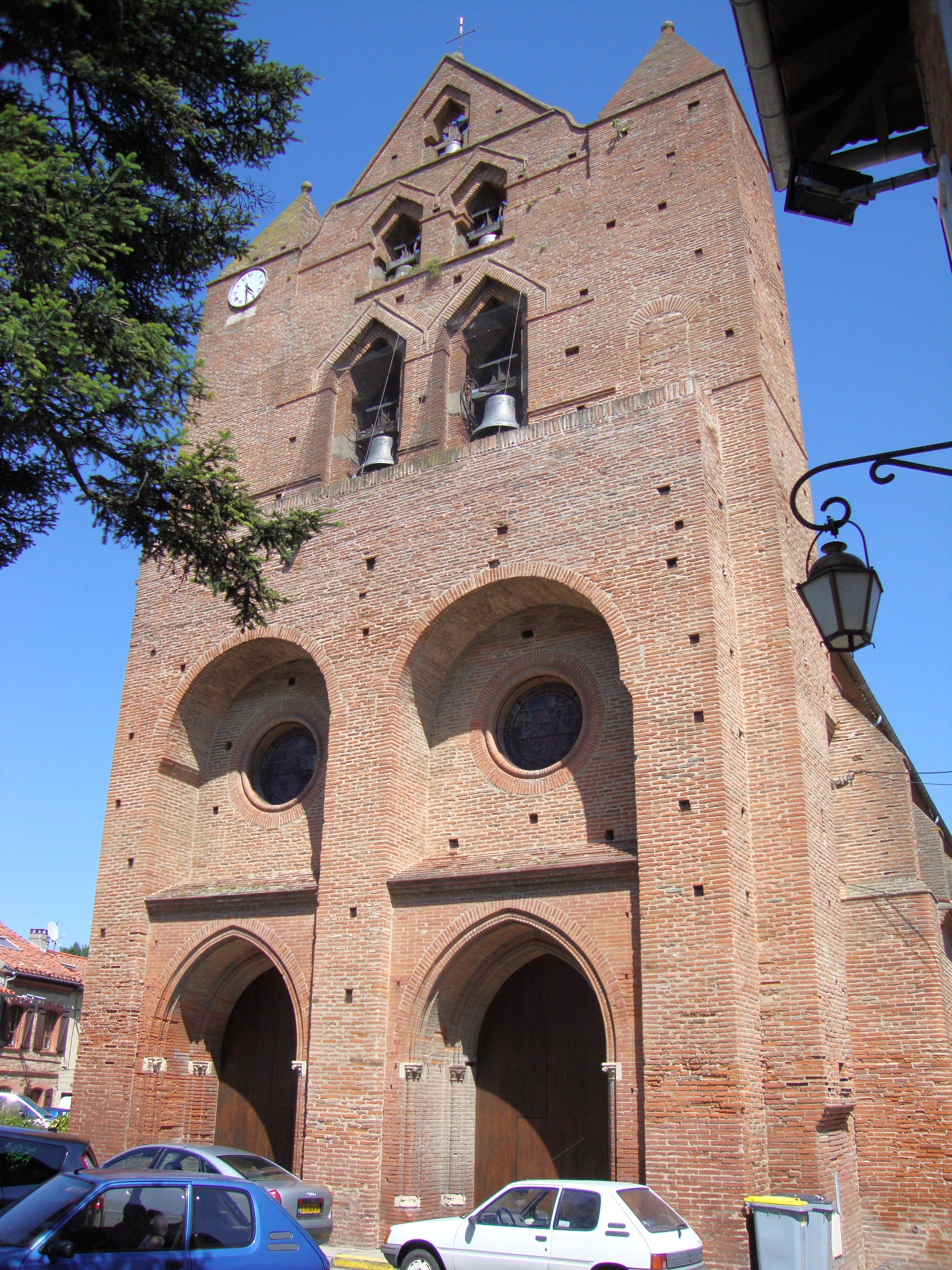

== See also ==
- Communes of the Haute-Garonne department
