= Lézignan-Corbières =

Commune in Occitanie, France

- Commune
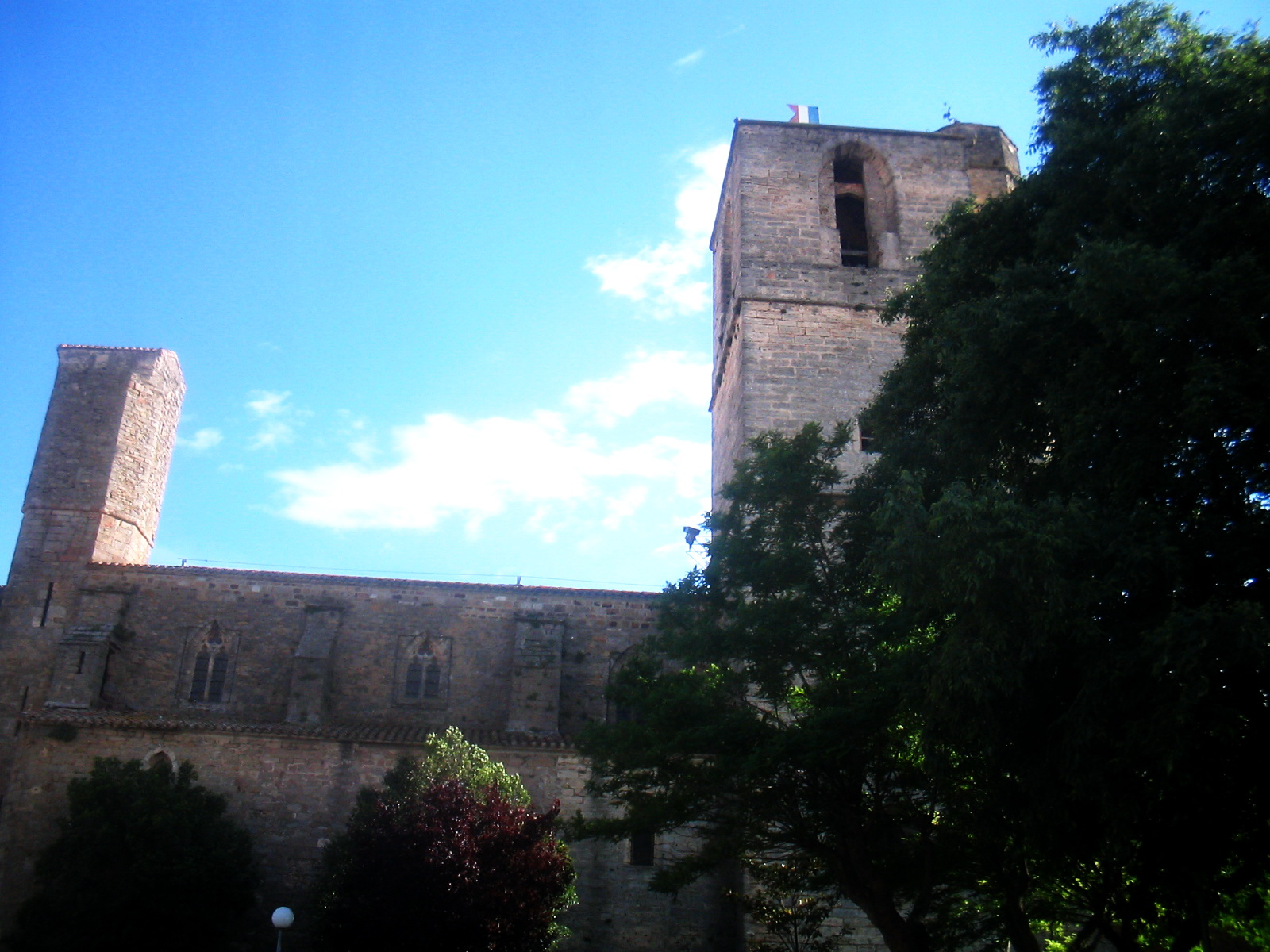
- The church in Lézignan-Corbières

- Coat of arms
- Location of Lézignan-Corbières
- Location within France Location within Occitanie
- Coordinates: 43°12′05″N 2°45′30″E
- Country: France
- Region: Occitania
- Department: Aude
- Arrondissement: Narbonne
- Canton: Le Lézignanais
- Intercommunality: Région Lézignanaise, Corbières et Minervois

Government
  - Mayor (2020–2026): Gérard Forcada
- Area^{1}: 37.68 km^{2} (14.55 sq mi)
- Elevation: 51 m (167 ft)
- Highest elevation: 187 m (614 ft)
- Lowest elevation: 19 m (62 ft)
- Population (2023): 10,343
  - Density: 274.5/km^{2} (710.9/sq mi)
- Time zone: UTC+01:00 (CET)
  - Summer (DST): UTC+02:00 (CEST)
- INSEE/Postal code: 11203 /11200
- ^{1} French Land Register data, which excludes lakes, ponds, glaciers > 1 km^{2} (0.386 sq mi or 247 acres) and river estuaries.

Lézignan-Corbières (French pronunciation: [leziɲɑ̃ kɔʁbjɛʁ]; Occitan: Lesinhan de las Corbièras) is a commune in the Aude department in the Occitanie region in southern France. Situated in the Corbières wine region not far from Narbonne, it has a Vine and Wine Museum (Musée de la Vigne et du Vin).

== Geography ==
The river Orbieu flows northeast through the southeastern part of the commune and forms part of its eastern border. Lézignan-Corbières station has rail connections to Toulouse, Carcassonne and Narbonne.

== Population ==
Historical population

Year	Pop.	±% p.a.
1793	1,379	—
1800	1,505	+1.26%
1806	1,668	+1.73%
1821	1,669	+0.00%
1831	1,792	+0.71%
1836	2,269	+4.83%
1841	2,168	−0.91%
1846	2,442	+2.41%
1851	2,537	+0.77%
1856	2,754	+1.65%
1861	3,016	+1.83%
1866	3,934	+5.46%
1872	3,969	+0.15%
1876	4,670	+4.15%
1881	6,286	+6.12%
1886	6,569	+0.88%
1891	4,792	−6.11%
1896	4,857	+0.27%
1901	4,951	+0.38%

Year	Pop.	±% p.a.
1906	6,339	+5.07%
1911	6,787	+1.38%
1921	7,039	+0.37%
1926	7,152	+0.32%
1931	7,227	+0.21%
1936	7,248	+0.06%
1946	6,986	−0.37%
1954	6,682	−0.55%
1962	6,939	+0.47%
1968	7,558	+1.43%
1975	7,355	−0.39%
1982	7,514	+0.31%
1990	7,881	+0.60%
1999	8,266	+0.53%
2007	9,712	+2.04%
2012	10,883	+2.30%
2017	11,168	+0.52%
2023	10,343	−1.27%

Source: EHESS and INSEE (1968-2023)

== Sport ==
Football Club de Lézignan (also known as Lézignan Sangliers - the Wild Boars) are a semi-professional rugby league club based in Lézignan-Corbières. They became French Champions for the first time in 30 years at the end of the 2007-2008 national competition.

Lezignan 9s is a rugby league nines tournament.

A FlyZone Indoor Skydiving Windtunnel has opened in November 2011 http://www.flyzone.fr/

== Education ==
Schools include:

Public preschools (école maternelle):

- Ecole Maternelle Alphonse Daudet
- Ecole Escouto Can Plaou
- Ecole Maternelle Françoise Dolto

Public primary schools (école primaire):

- Ecole Frédéric Mistral (from CP to CE1)
- Ecole Marie-Curie (from CE2 to CM2)

Public junior high schools (collège):

- Collège Joseph Anglade
- Collège Rosa Parks

There is one public senior high school/sixth form college, Lycée Ernest Ferroul.

Private schools:

- L'Institut l'Amandier (collège-lycée)
- Ecole Privée Sainte Thérèse (maternelle-primaire)

== See also ==
- Corbières AOC
- Communes of the Aude department
