= Quillan station =

Railway station in Quillan, France

Coordinates: 42°52′21″N 2°10′55″E

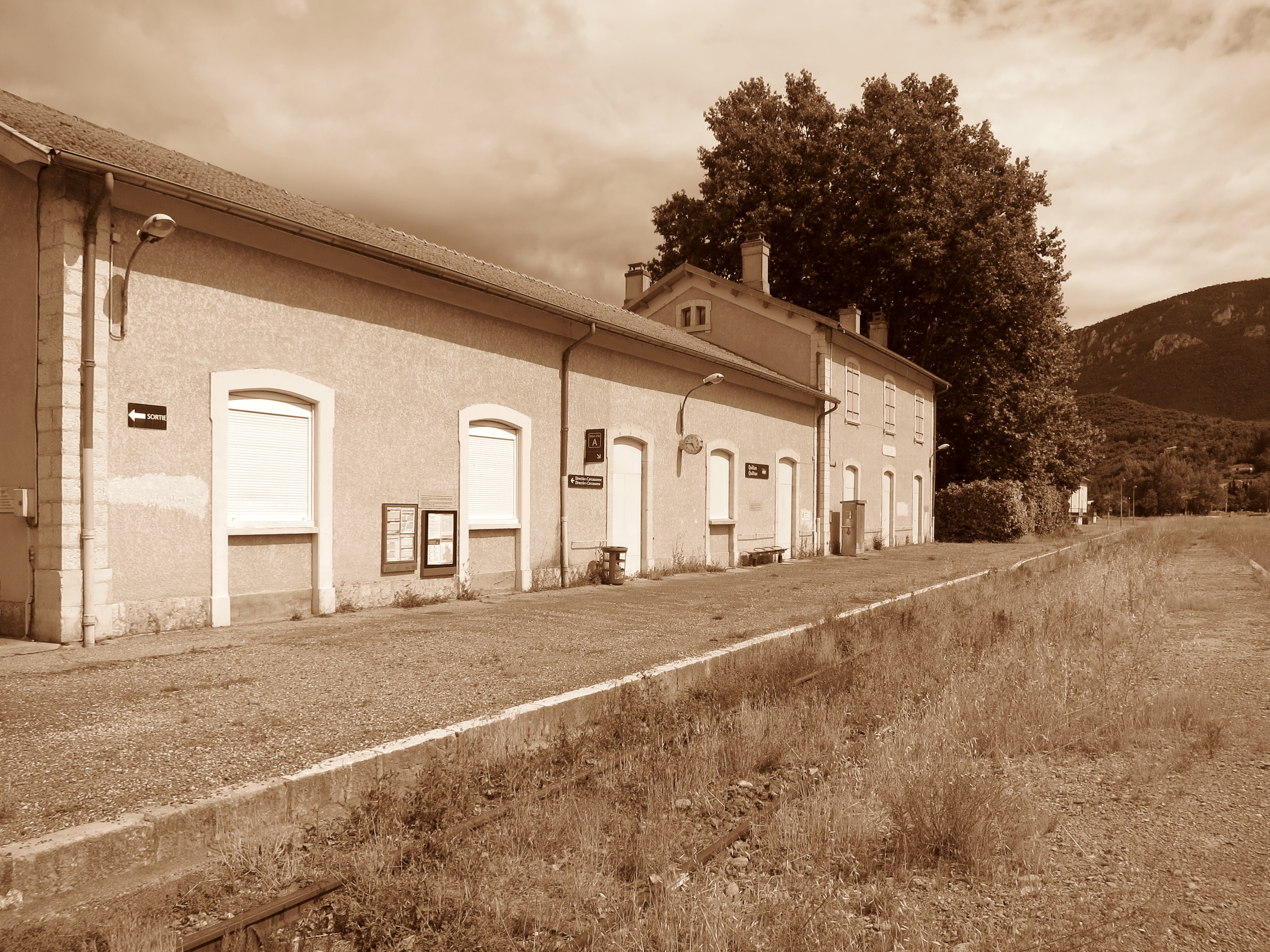
Quillan train station

Quillan is a railway station in Quillan, Occitanie, France. The station is on the Carcassonne–Rivesaltes line. The station is served by TER Occitanie bus services. Today the railway line finishes here and resumes in Axat as a museum railway line. The section between Quillan and Axat was closed in 1939. Train services between Limoux and Quillan were suspended in 2018, and are expected to be resumed in 2025.
