= Espéraza station =

Railway station in Espéraza, France

Coordinates: 42°56′09″N 2°13′06″E

Espéraza is a railway station in Espéraza, Occitanie, France. The station is on the Carcassonne–Rivesaltes line. The station is served by TER Occitanie bus services to Limoux and Quillan. Train services between Limoux and Quillan were suspended in 2018, and are expected to be resumed in 2025.
