= Gare de Perpignan murders =

Criminal case in France

The Gare de Perpignan murders is a French criminal case. Between 1995 and 2001, four girls disappeared, and three were found dead in similar conditions. Authorities initially thought it was the work of a serial killer. In June 2015, three of the four disappearances were cleared up and involved two different murderers.

== History ==
Four girls of similar appearance disappeared near the station area in Perpignan, France. The victims were:

- Tatiana Andújar (17) 24 September 1995
- Mokhtaria Chaïb (19) 21 December 1997
- Marie-Hélène Gonzalez (22) 16 June 1998
- Fatima Idrahou (23) 19 February 2001

Tatiana Andújar has never been found, dead or alive. The three other girls were found dead in a state of undress. Chaïb and Gonzalez's genitals had been mutilated. González's head and hands were found in a trash bag six months after the disappearance. The personal effects of the victims have never been found.

== Fatima Idrahou ==
The fourth victim, Fatima Idrahou, took a lift and was kidnapped. A witness saw the type, the color and identified part of the car's number plate. A bar manager, Marc Delpech, who was married and a father, was arrested fourteen days after the crime. Delpech confessed the murder while in custody. He explained his crime by saying that she had rejected his advances. Her undressed body was found on the bank of the pool of Canet-en-Roussillon. On 18 June 2001, Marc Delpech was sentenced to thirty years of imprisonment with a minimum of twenty years without the possibility of parole. The sentence was affirmed in the appeal court.

== Mokhtaria Chaïb and Marie-Hélène Gonzalez ==
In the middle of October 2014, the DNA of Mokhtaria Chaïb's assailant was identified as Jacques Rançon, a then 54-year-old father of four children. He had moved to Perpignan in 1997, the year he killed her. Jacques Rançon had been repeatedly convicted of sexual assault and violence, including a rape. Rançon confessed to the rape and the murder of Mokhtaria Chaïb while in custody. He was exonerated of the disappearance of Tatiana Andújar, because he was in prison at the time. On 18 June 2015, Rançon confessed to the murder of Marie-Hélène Gonzalez.

== Tatiana Andújar ==
Tatiana Andújar has never been found, dead or alive. Her disappearance has not been solved.

== In media ==
=== Television ===
These investigations form the basis for the French true crime television series, the Lost Station Girls, released on 8 October, 2025 on Disney+'s Hulu hub.
