= The Lost Station Girls =

French true crime drama series

- Starring: Camille Razat; Hugo Becker; Patrick Timsit; Mélanie Doutey; Kévin Azaïs; Ludovic Berthillot; Yannick Choirat
- Country of origin: France
- Original language: French
- No. of episodes: 6

Production
- Producers: Gaëlle Bellan; Virgine Sauvier

Original release
- Network: Hulu (Disney+)

Lost Station Girls is a 2025 French true crime television series about a twenty year police investigation into the murders of three young women in the south-of-France. The series broadcast on Disney+'s Hulu hub with a cast led by Camille Razat, alongside Hugo Becker, Patrick Timsit, Mélanie Doutey, Kévin Azaïs, Ludovic Berthillot and Yannick Choirat.

== Premise ==
This true crime series is based on the Gare de Perpignan murders. The story is centred around the disappearance of a young woman and the murder of three others in Perpignan, in the south of France which all occurred between 1995 and 2001.

== Cast ==
- Camille Razat
- Hugo Becker
- Patrick Timsit
- Mélanie Doutey
- Kévin Azaïs
- Ludovic Berthillot
- Yannick Choirat

== Production ==
The six-part series is produced by Itinéraire for Disney+ and was announced by Disney+ at Series Mania event in March 2024. The company Itinéaire previously produced the series Oussekine for the streaming service. Kevin Deysson, director of Disney+ original productions said that the show's creator Gaëlle Bellan was aiming "to give visibility to the victims [who were] women who were free and full of life," and to discuss broader themes such as "what it was like to be a woman in our society".

Principal photography was underway on 11 March 2024, with filming locations including Perpignan in the South of France and Hérault in Occitania. The series producer is Virginie Sauveur.

Camille Razat was confirmed in a leading role in the cast in March 2024, with the cast also including Hugo Becker, Patrick Timsit, Mélanie Doutey, Kévin Azaïs, Ludovic Berthillot and Yannick Choirat. In April 2025, Razat confirmed on her social media that she had finished filming on the series.

== Release ==
The series became available to stream on Disney+'s Hulu hub in certain territories from 8 October 2025.
