= Cerbère station =

Railway station in France

Coordinates: 42°26′35″N 3°9′49″E

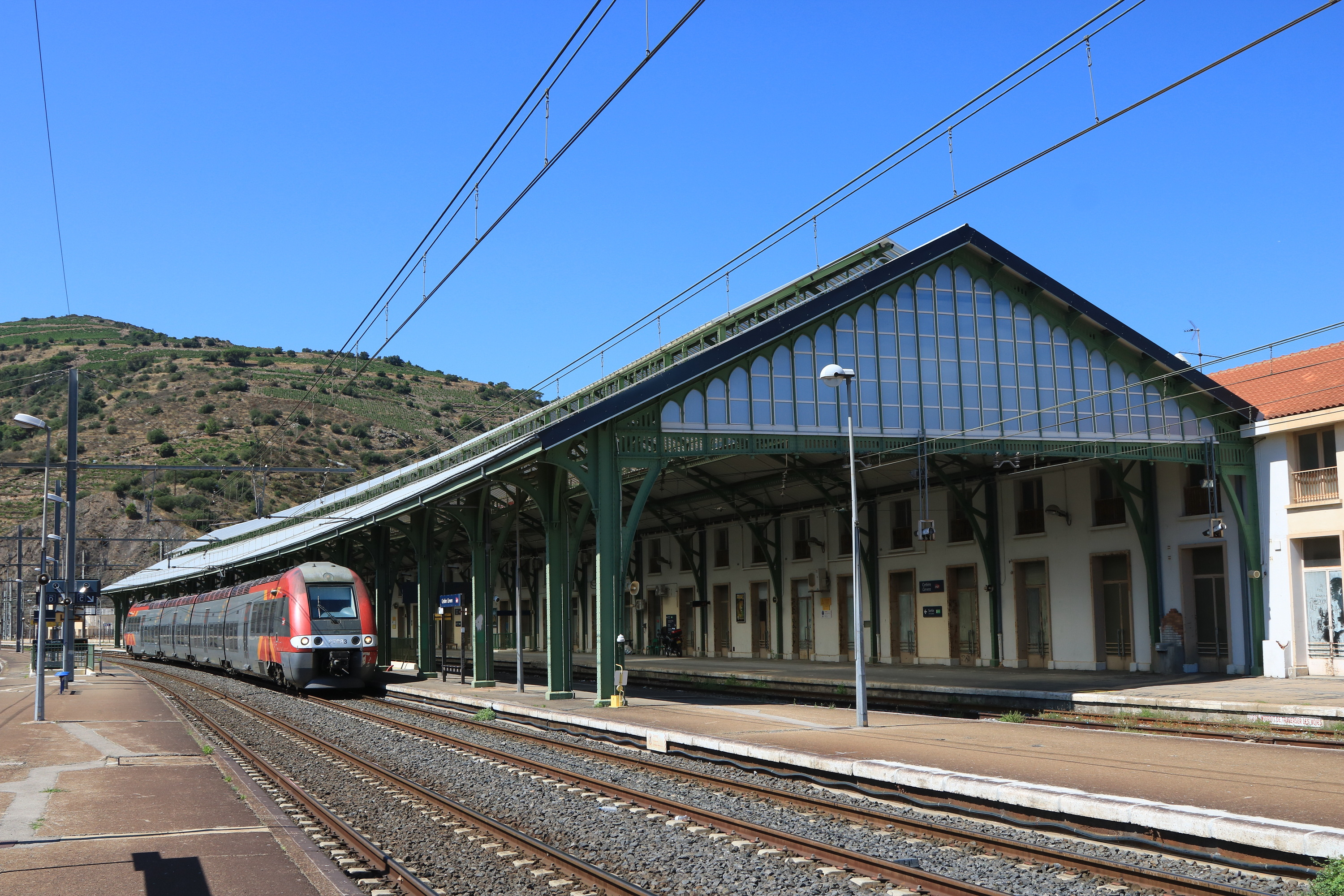
Cerbère station

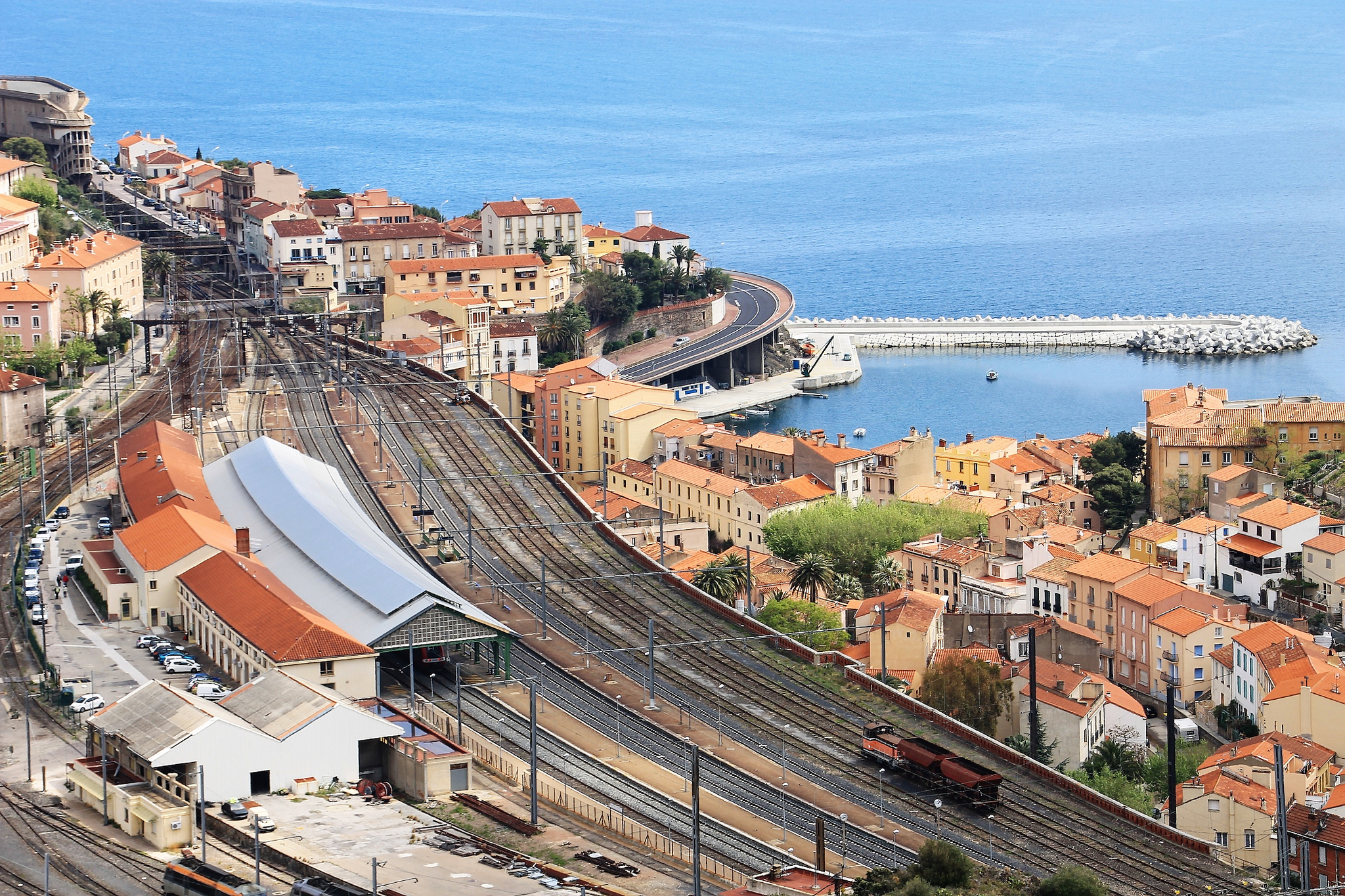
Aerial view of the station showing surrounding town areas

Cerbère station (French: Gare de Cerbère) is the railway station serving the border town Cerbère, Pyrénées-Orientales department, southern France.

It is connected to the Portbou railway station in Spain by the Balitres tunnel, which uses standard gauge track for trains continuing in France and Iberian gauge track for trains continuing in Spain; both stations provide an opportunity to change between French and Spanish services. The tunnel provided a walking escape route for defeated Spanish republicans in 1939 at the end of the Spanish Civil War.

The following services currently call at Cerbère:

- night services (Intercités de nuit) Paris–Carcassonne–Narbonne–Cerbère
- local service (TER Occitanie) Portbou–Cerbère–Narbonne–Montpellier–Avignon
- local service (TER Occitanie) Portbou–Cerbère–Perpignan–Narbonne–Toulouse
- local service (Rodalies de Catalunya) Barcelona–Portbou–Cerbère (Outbound service only from Barcelona)

Historically, the station was also served by the Catalan Talgo service from Montpellier to Barcelona and the Talgo from Montpellier to Murcia, which changed gauge at Portbou, and the Estrella Costa Brava sleeper train from Madrid (on the Iberian gauge track).

Preceding station	SNCF	Following station
Banyuls-sur-Mer towards Paris-Austerlitz	Intercités (night)	Terminus
Preceding station	TER Occitanie	Following station
Portbou Terminus	22	Perpignan towards Avignon-Centre
Portbou Terminus	23	Banyuls-sur-Mer towards Narbonne
Portbou Terminus	25	Banyuls-sur-Mer towards Toulouse
Preceding station	Rodalies de Catalunya	Following station
Terminus	R11	Portbou towards Barcelona Sants
