= Narbonne station =

Railway station in Narbonne, France

Narbonne
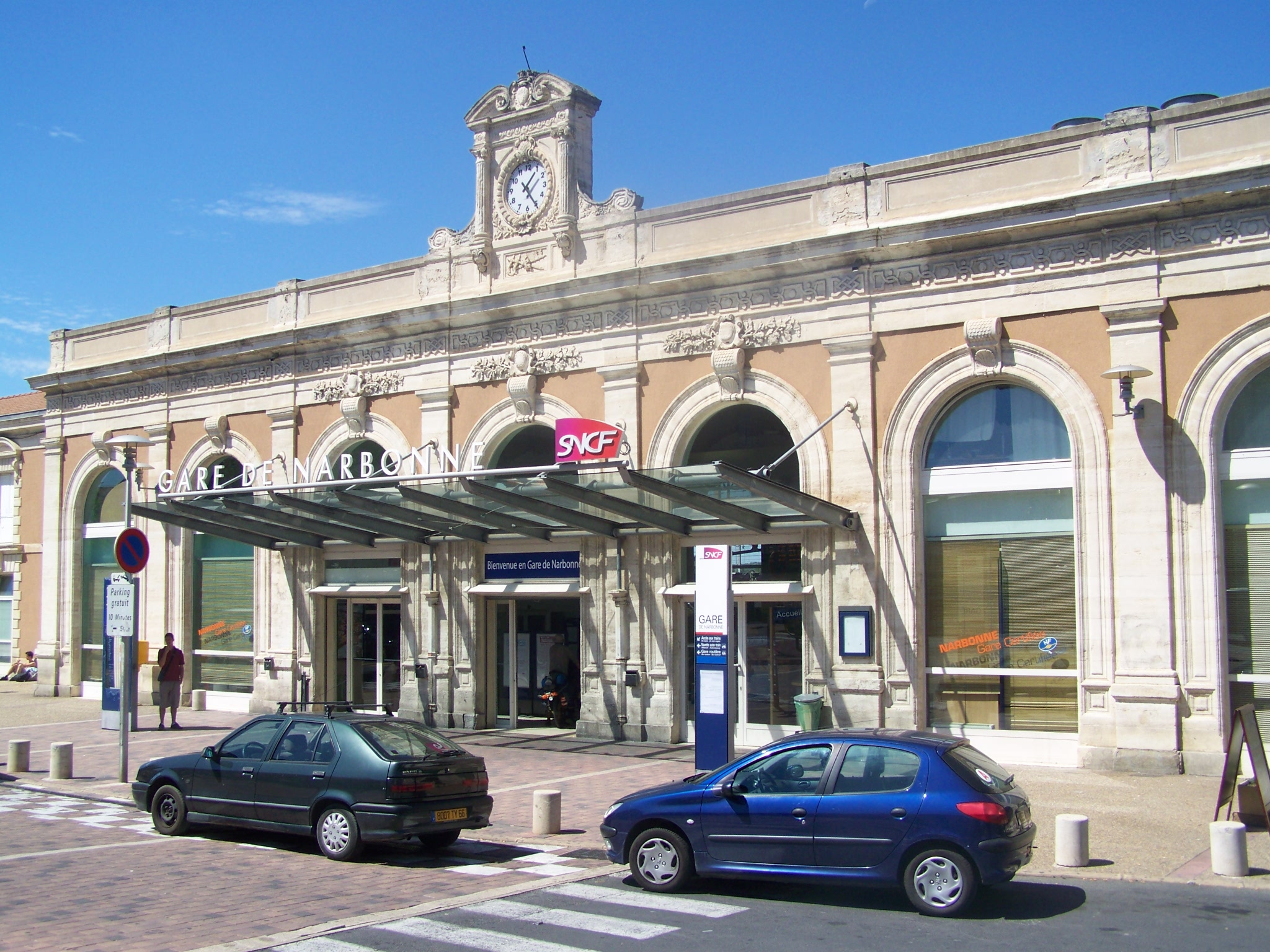
- Narbonne railway station

General information
- Location: Narbonne, Aude, Occitanie; France
- Coordinates: 43°11′26.19″N 3°0′20.38″E
- Owner: SNCF
- Lines: Bordeaux–Sète railway Narbonne–Portbou railway
- Platforms: 3
- Tracks: 6; 2 (abandoned)

Construction
- Structure type: Ground
- Parking: Yes (Parking estacion tren)

Other information
- Station code: 87781104

History
- Opened: 22 April 1857
- Electrified: 1935

Passengers
- 2024: 2,423,475
Services
Preceding station	Renfe Operadora	Following station
Montpellier towards Lyon-Part-Dieu	AVE	Perpignan towards Barcelona Sants
Preceding station	SNCF	Following station
Montpellier towards Paris-Lyon	TGV inOui	Perpignan towards Barcelona Sants
Béziers towards Paris-Lyon	TGV inOui	Perpignan Terminus
Carcassonne towards Toulouse	TGV inOui	Béziers towards Lyon-Part-Dieu
Carcassonne towards Bordeaux	Intercités	Béziers towards Marseille
Lézignan-Corbières towards Paris-Austerlitz	Intercités (night)	Port-la-Nouvelle towards Cerbère
Preceding station	TER Occitanie	Following station
Terminus	6	Béziers towards Marseille
Lézignan-Corbières towards Toulouse	10	Terminus
Terminus	21	Coursan towards Avignon-Centre
Perpignan towards Portbou	22	Béziers towards Avignon-Centre
Port-la-Nouvelle towards Portbou	23	Terminus
Port-la-Nouvelle towards Portbou	25	Lézignan-Corbières towards Toulouse
Location

Narbonne is a railway station in Narbonne, Occitanie, France. The station opened on 22 April 1857 and is on the Bordeaux–Sète railway and Narbonne–Portbou railway lines. The station is served by TGV (high speed), Intercités (long distance, also night train) and TER (local) services operated by the SNCF. The line was electrified through Narbonne in 1935.

The station is at an important 3-way junction, with both passenger and freight services coming from Toulouse, Nîmes, Perpignan and Spain (via Portbou). Some trains avoid the station, by a curve between the Toulouse and Perpignan lines.

== Train services ==
The following services currently call at Narbonne (2022):

- High speed services (TGV)
  - Paris–Valence–Nîmes–Montpellier–Perpignan–Barcelona
  - Lyon–Nîmes–Montpellier–Perpignan–Barcelona
  - Marseille–Nîmes–Montpellier–Perpignan–Barcelona–Madrid
  - Lyon–Nîmes–Montpellier–Toulouse
- Intercity service (Intercités)
  - Bordeaux–Toulouse–Montpellier–Marseille
- Night services (Intercités de nuit)
  - Paris–Carcassonne–Narbonne–Cerbère
- Local service (TER Occitanie)
- Narbonne–Béziers–Montpellier–Nîmes–Avignon
  - Toulouse–Carcassonne–Narbonne
  - Cerbère–Perpignan–Narbonne
- Express service (TER Occitanie)
  - Cerbère–Perpignan–Narbonne–Montpellier–Nîmes–Avignon
  - Narbonne–Montpellier–Nîmes–Arles–Marseille

== Gallery ==
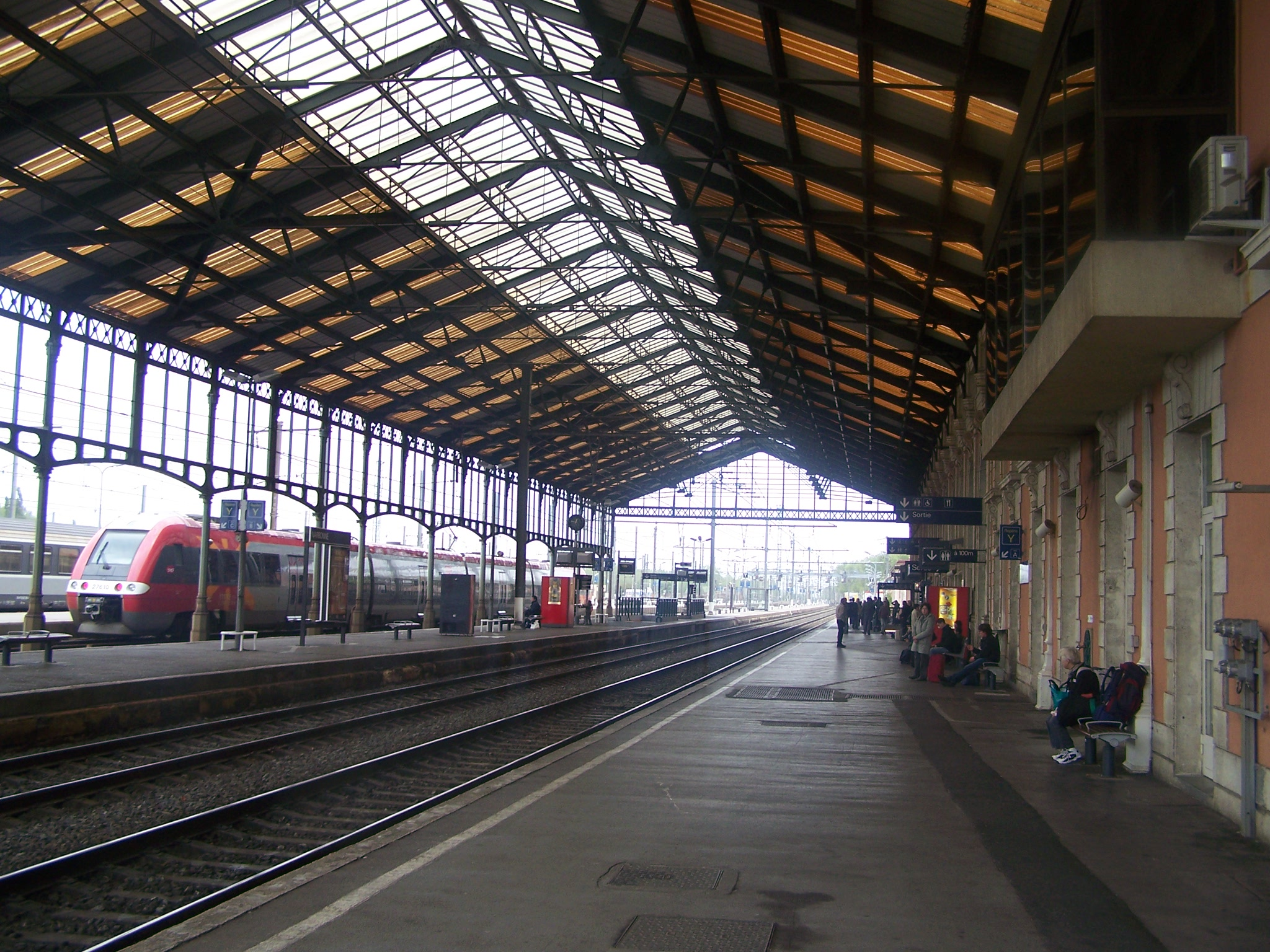
The station and the station roof

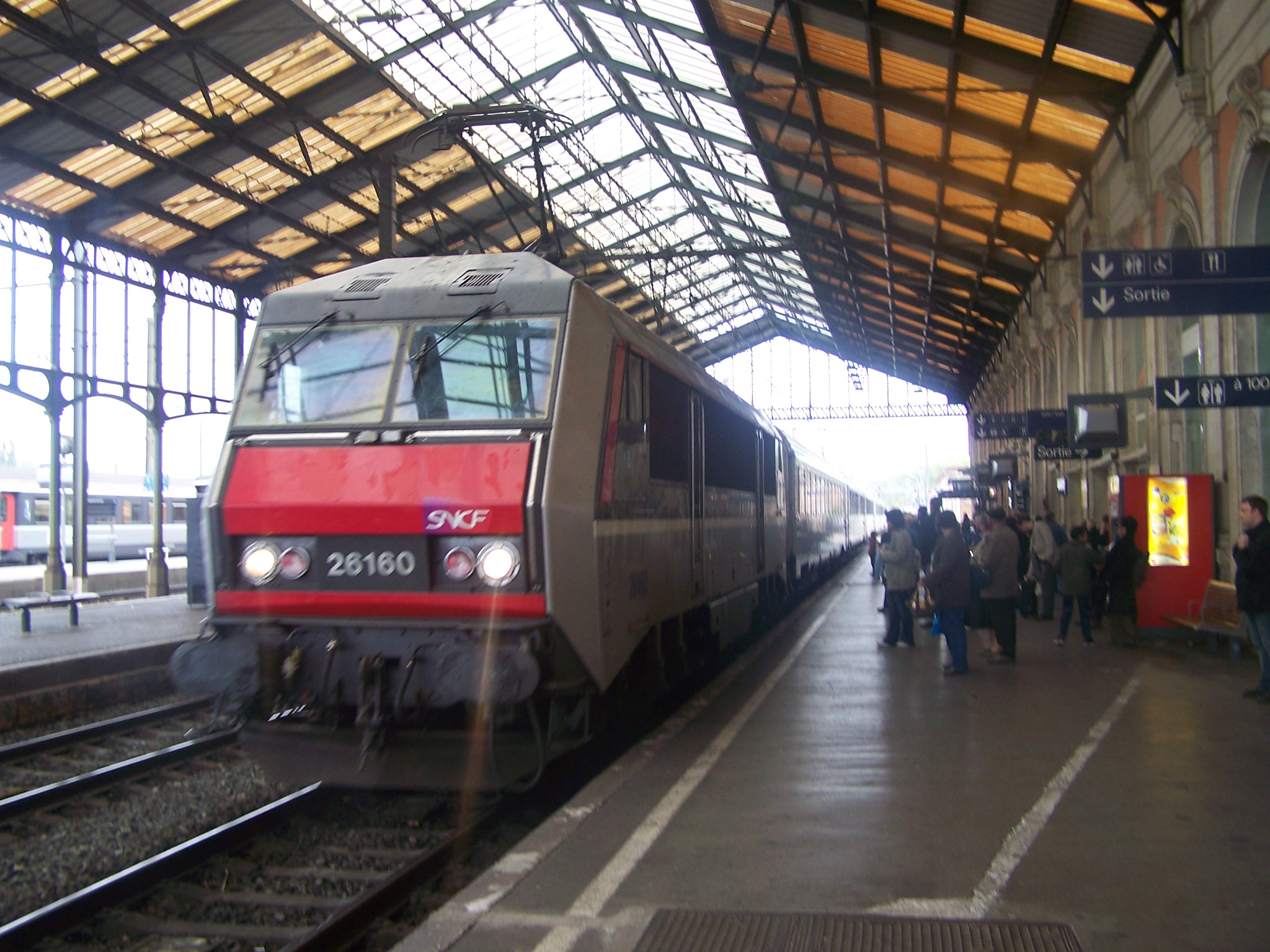
A TER train from Nîmes to Portbou arrives at the station

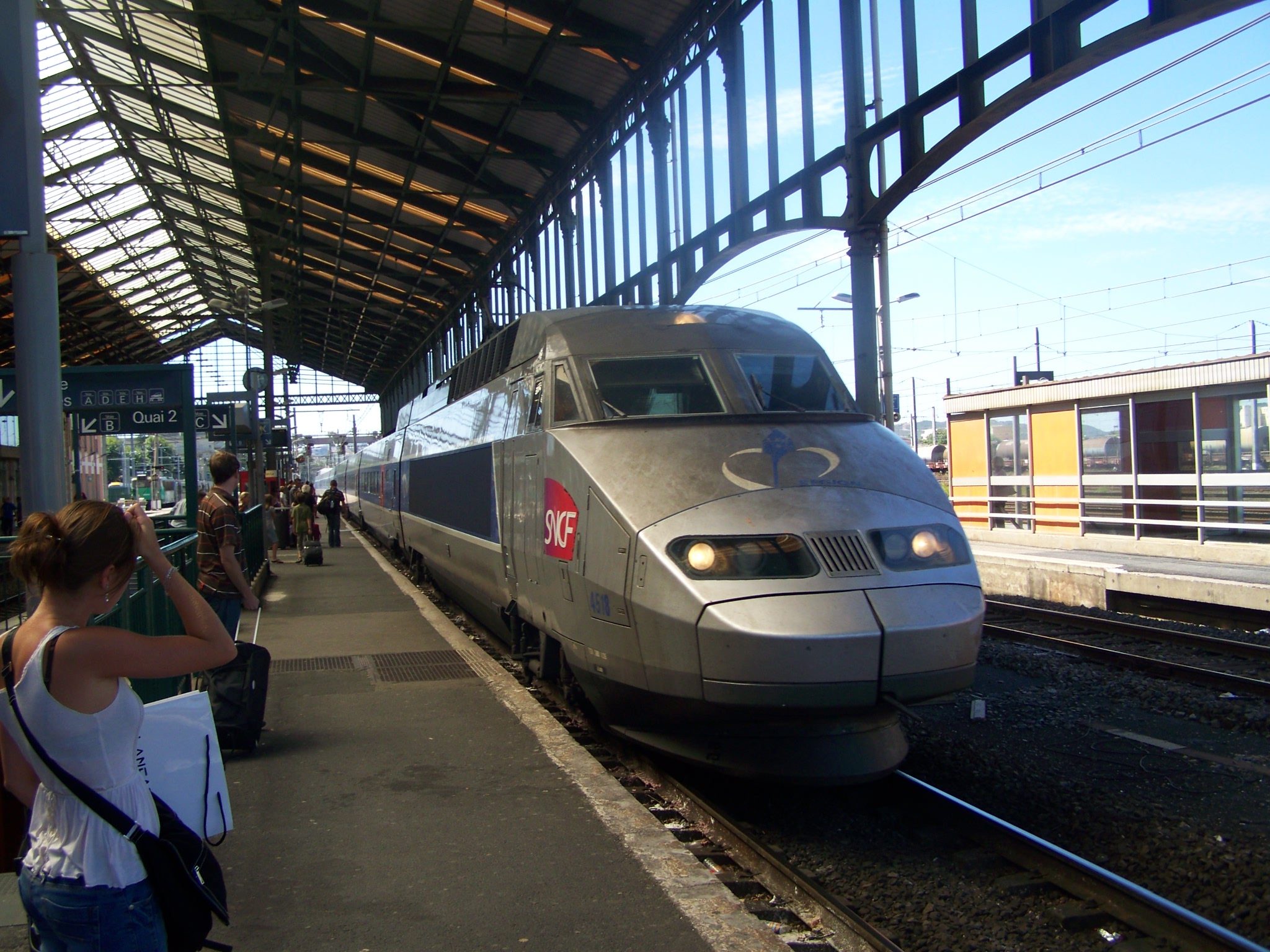
A TGV train for Lille and Brussels arrives at the station
