= Portbou railway station =

Railway station in Portbou, Spain

Portbou
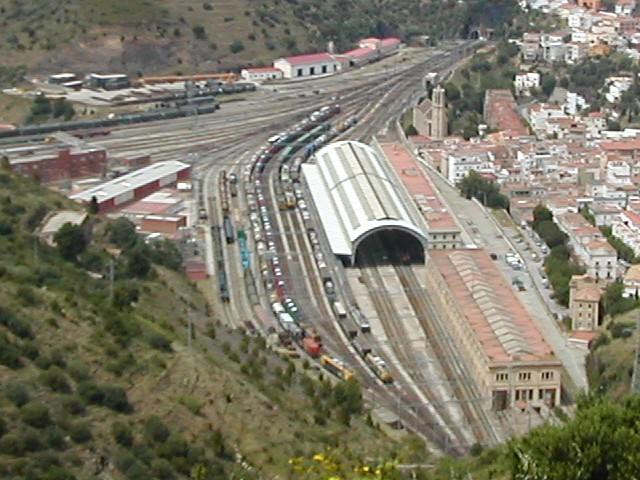
- Aerial view of the station

General information
- Location: Carrer Claudi Planas; 17497 Portbou; Spain
- Coordinates: 42°25′29″N 3°9′28″E
- Owner: Adif
- Operator: Renfe Operadora and SNCF
- Lines: Barcelona–Cerbère (PK 97.227); Narbonne–Portbou

Construction
- Structure type: At-grade

Other information
- Station code: 79315

History
- Opened: 1878

Services
Preceding station	Rodalies de Catalunya	Following station
Colera towards Barcelona Sants	R11	Cerbère Outbound Regional (R) services only Terminus
Colera towards L'Hospitalet de Llobregat	RG1	Terminus
Preceding station	TER Occitanie	Following station
Terminus	22	Cerbère towards Avignon-Centre
Terminus	23	Cerbère towards Narbonne
Terminus	25	Cerbère towards Toulouse
Location
- Location within Catalonia Location within Spain Location within Europe

Portbou is a railway station serving Portbou in Catalonia, Spain. It is on the Barcelona–Cerbère railway and the Narbonne–Portbou railway. The station is owned by Adif and is served by Rodalies de Catalunya regional line R11 and Girona commuter rail service line RG1 and TER Occitanie trains also serve the station.

The station is a border railway station where all trains have to stop, as those coming from/going into France have to change gauge from 1,668 mm (5 ft 5 21/32 in) Iberian gauge to 1,435 mm (4 ft 8 1/2 in) standard gauge. Between Portbou railway station and Cerbère railway station in France, both track gauges run through the Balitres tunnel.
