= Méridienne verte =

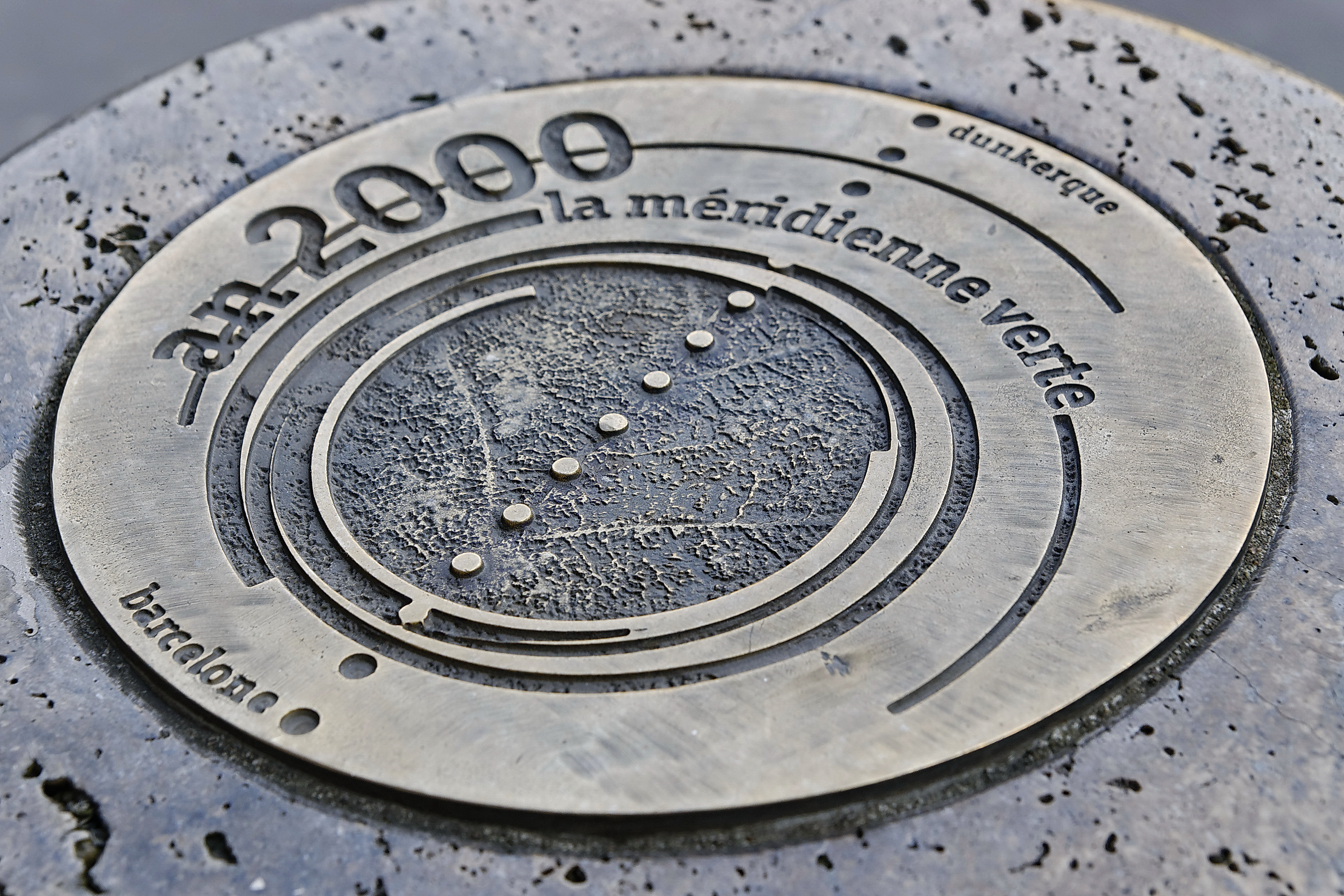
Medallion on a Méridienne verte marker in the Rue de Rivoli, Paris 1

The Méridienne verte (Green Meridian) is a project devised by the architect Paul Chemetov for the 2000 celebration in France. It involved marking on the ground the Paris Meridian crossing France from North to South (from Dunkerque in Nord-Pas-de-Calais to Prats-de-Mollo-la-Preste in Pyrénées-Orientales) by planting trees along the whole line.

On 14 July (Bastille Day) 2000, a picnic was organised along the length of the Méridienne verte. For the occasion, the imaginary line was marked in the sky above Paris by two lasers, located on the Observatory, whose centre defines the longitude of the meridian, and the nearby Senate, also on the line. With a diameter of 4 m and a reach of 1.3 km, their coloured beams lit up the 6th and 14th arrondissements of Paris for three consecutive nights, from 13 to 15 July.

At the intersection of the Meridian and the 45th parallel, in the commune of Ayrens (Cantal), trees have been planted in two perpendicular lines to mark the crossing.

== Communes crossed ==
From North to South, the Méridienne verte crosses 8 régions, 20 départements and 337 communes.

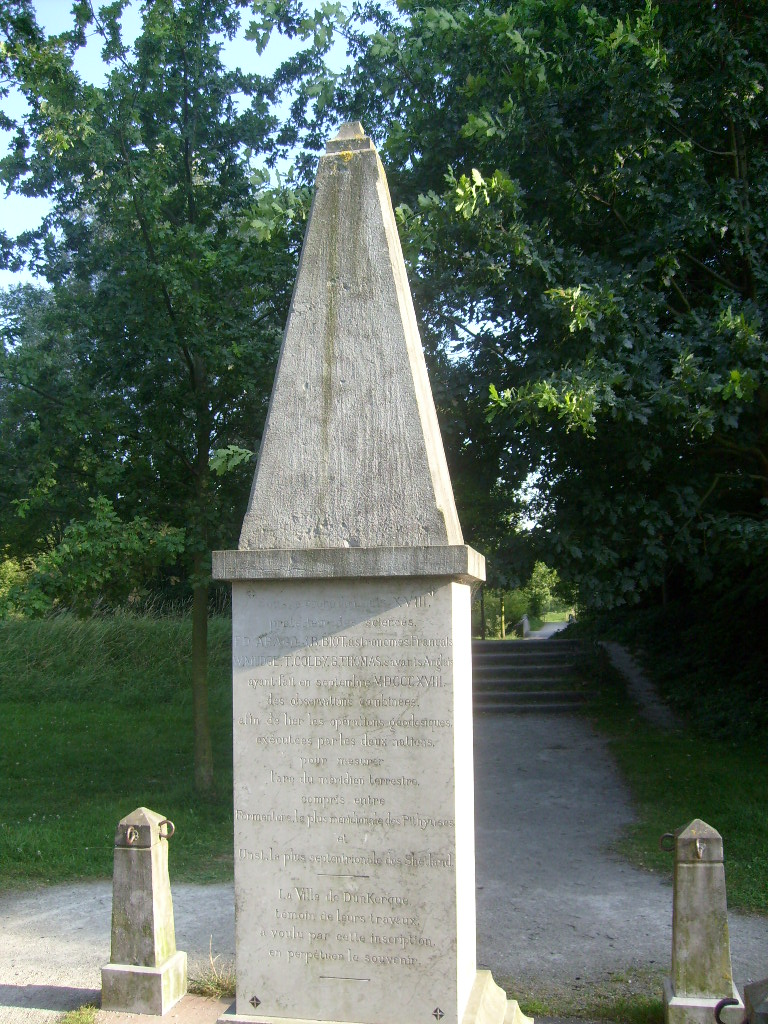
Monument marking the Meridian at Dunkerque

- In the Nord-Pas-de-Calais région :
  - In the Nord département : Dunkerque, Saint-Pol-sur-Mer, Armbouts-Cappel, Spycker, Pitgam, Drincham, Eringhem, Bollezeele, Rubrouck, Broxeele, Buysscheure, Noordpeene
  - In the Pas-de-Calais département : Clairmarais, Arques, Campagne-lès-Wardrecques, Wardrecques, Racquinghem, Quiestède, Roquetoire, Mametz, Aire-sur-la-Lys, Witternesse, Blessy, Liettres, Estrée-Blanche, Ligny-lès-Aire, Westrehem, Fontaine-lès-Hermans, Nédonchel, Fiefs, Sains-lès-Pernes, Hestrus, Conteville-en-Ternois, Hernicourt, Troisvaux, Saint-Pol-sur-Ternoise, Saint-Michel-sur-Ternoise, Herlin-le-Sec, Hautecloque, Buneville, Sibiville, Bouret-sur-Canche, Rebreuve-sur-Canche
- In the Picardie région :
  - In the Somme département : Bouquemaison, Doullens, Beauval, Beauquesne, La Vicogne, Talmas, Villers-Bocage, Coisy, Cardonnette, Allonville, Rivery, Amiens, Camon, Cagny, Saint-Fuscien, Boves, Sains-en-Amiénois, Cottenchy, Estrées-sur-Noye, Jumel, Ailly-sur-Noye, Chaussoy-Epagny, La Faloise, Folleville
  - In the Oise département : Paillart, Le Plessier-sur-Bulles, Rouvroy-les-Merles, Breteuil, Beauvoir, Bonvillers, Saint-André-Farivillers, Campremy, Wavignies, Thieux, Bucamps, Le Quesnel-Aubry, Nourard-le-Franc, Le Mesnil-sur-Bulles, Bulles, Litz, La Neuville-en-Hez, Thury-sous-Clermont, Angy, Bury, Balagny-sur-Thérain, Cires-lès-Mello, Blaincourt-lès-Précy, Crouy-en-Thelle, Précy-sur-Oise, Boran-sur-Oise

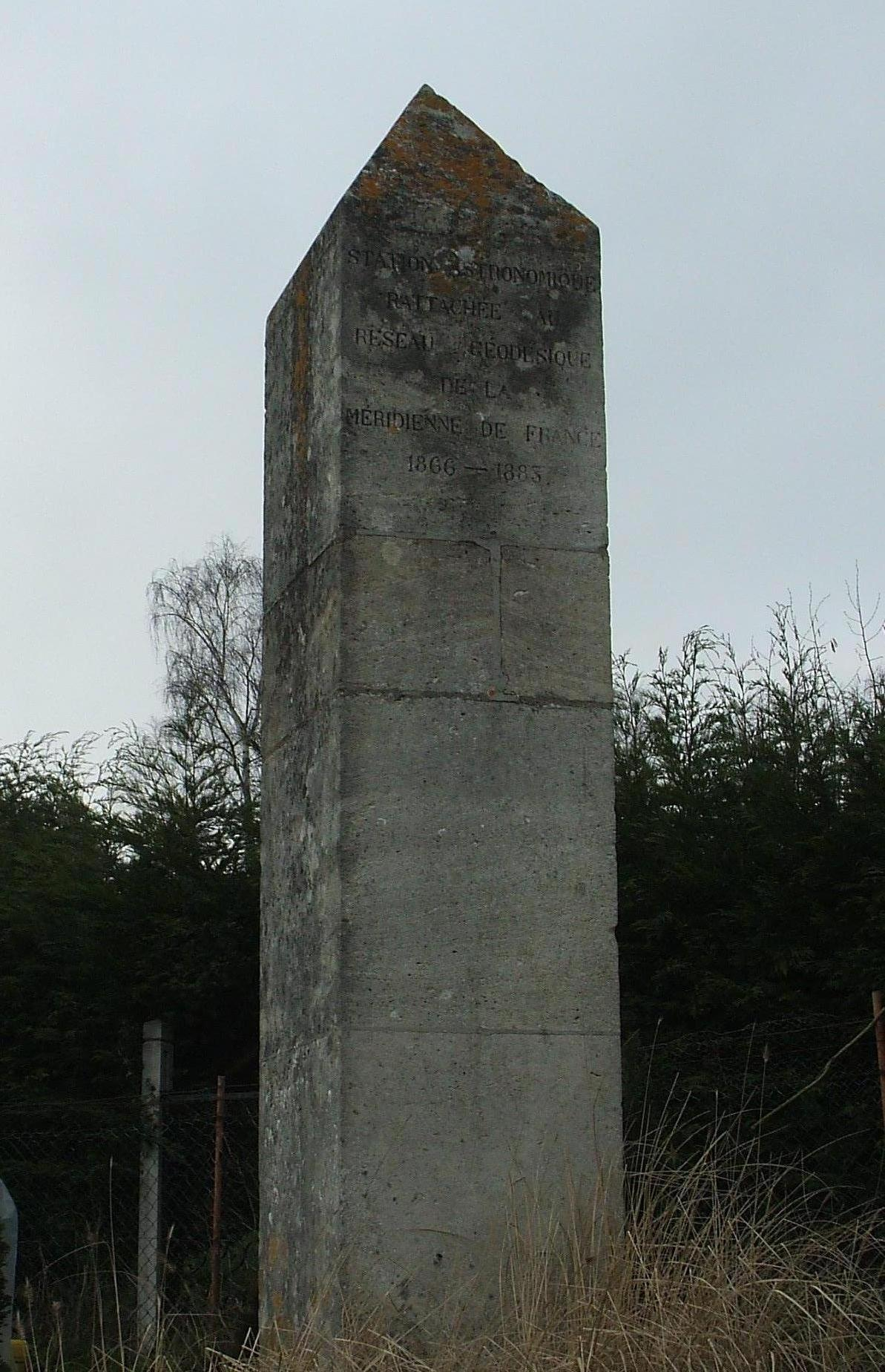
Stele at Saint-Martin-du-Tertre. The inscription refers to the geodesic survey of France 1866-1883.

- In the Île-de-France région :
  - In the Val-d'Oise département : Asnières-sur-Oise, Noisy-sur-Oise, Saint-Martin-du-Tertre, Maffliers, Attainville, Moisselles, Domont, Piscop, Saint-Brice-sous-Forêt, Montmorency, Groslay, Montmagny, Deuil-la-Barre
  - In the Seine-Saint-Denis département : Villetaneuse, Épinay-sur-Seine, L'Île-Saint-Denis, Saint-Denis, Saint-Ouen
  - Paris
  - In the Hauts-de-Seine département : Villeneuve-la-Garenne
  - In the Val-de-Marne département : Gentilly, Arcueil, Cachan, L'Haÿ-les-Roses, Chevilly-Larue, Fresnes, Rungis
  - In the Essonne département : Wissous, Morangis, Savigny-sur-Orge, Épinay-sur-Orge, Villemoisson-sur-Orge, Sainte-Geneviève-des-Bois, Le Plessis-Pâté, Vert-le-Grand, Leudeville, Saint-Vrain, Itteville, Cerny, D'Huison-Longueville, Vayres-sur-Essonne, Courdimanche-sur-Essonne, Maisse, Gironville-sur-Essonne, Prunay-sur-Essonne, Champmotteux, Boigneville
- In the Centre-Val de Loire région :
  - In the Loiret département : Nangeville, Orveau-Bellesauve, Coudray, Manchecourt, Ramoulu, Aulnay-la-Rivière, Estouy, Yèvre-la-Ville, Boynes, Courcelles, Nancray-sur-Rimarde, Boiscommun, Nibelle, Nesploy, Sury-aux-Bois, Saint-Martin-d'Abbat, Bouzy-la-Forêt, Saint-Aignan-des-Gués, Bray-en-Val, Saint-Benoît-sur-Loire, Sully-sur-Loire, Viglain, Villemurlin, Cerdon
  - In the Cher département : Clémont, Sainte-Montaine, Ménétréol-sur-Sauldre, Presly, Méry-ès-Bois, Allogny, Saint-Éloy-de-Gy, Saint-Doulchard, Marmagne, La Chapelle-Saint-Ursin, Bourges, Le Subdray, Trouy, Arçay, Sainte-Lunaise, Corquoy, Châteauneuf-sur-Cher, Venesmes, Crézançay-sur-Cher, Saint-Symphorien, Chambon, Morlac, Marçais, Ardenais, Le Châtelet, Reigny, Culan, Sidiailles
- In the Auvergne région :
  - In the Allier département : Saint-Éloy-d'Allier, Viplaix, Saint-Palais, Mesples, Saint-Sauvier, Treignat
- In the Limousin région :
  - In the Creuse département : Soumans, Leyrat, Verneiges, Auge, Lussat, Tardes, Le Chauchet, Saint-Priest, La Serre-Bussière-Vieille, Mainsat, Champagnat, Lupersat, Saint-Silvain-Bellegarde, La Villetelle, Saint-Pardoux-d'Arnet, Saint-Maurice-près-Crocq, Saint-Agnant-près-Crocq, Flayat, Malleret, Saint-Oradoux-de-Chirouze, Saint-Martial-le-Vieux
  - In the Corrèze département : Couffy-sur-Sarsonne, Courteix, Saint-Pardoux-le-Neuf, Ussel, Saint-Exupéry-les-Roches, Mestes, Chirac-Bellevue, Saint-Étienne-la-Geneste, Sainte-Marie-Lapanouze, Liginiac, Sérandon
- Once more in the Auvergne région :
  - In the Cantal département : Arches, Pleaux, Sourniac, Le Vigean, Mauriac, Ally, Escorailles, Saint-Martin-Cantalès, Saint-Cirgues-de-Malbert, Saint-Illide, Ayrens, Teissières-de-Cornet, Crandelles, Saint-Paul-des-Landes, Ytrac, Sansac-de-Marmiesse, Saint-Mamet-la-Salvetat, Vitrac, Marcolès, Saint-Antoine, Calvinet, Mourjou, Cassaniouze
- In the Midi-Pyrénées région :
  - In the Aveyron département : Grand-Vabre, Almont-les-Junies, Noailhac, Firmi, Auzits, Escandolières, Goutrens, Rignac, Belcastel, Colombiès, Castanet, Gramond, Sauveterre-de-Rouergue, Quins, Naucelle, Tauriac-de-Naucelle, Saint-Just-sur-Viaur
  - In the Tarn département : Tanus, Tréban, Montauriol, Lacapelle-Pinet, Crespin, Padiès, Andouque, Saint-Julien-Gaulène, Saint-Cirgue, Sérénac, Ambialet, Villefranche-d'Albigeois, Teillet, Le Travet, Arifat, Montredon-Labessonnié, Lacrouzette, Burlats, Saint-Salvy-de-la-Balme, Noailhac, Caucalières, Payrin-Augmontel, Aussillon, Aiguefonde, Mazamet
- In the Languedoc-Roussillon région :
  - In the Aude département : Les Martys, Conques-sur-Orbiel, Miraval-Cabardès, La Tourette-Cabardès, Villanière, Villardonnel, Salsigne, Aragon, Villegailhenc, Pennautier, Carcassonne, Cavanac, Couffoulens, Leuc, Verzeille, Ladern-sur-Lauquet, Saint-Hilaire, Villebazy, Saint-Polycarpe, Belcastel-et-Buc, Terroles, Peyrolles, Serres, Rennes-les-Bains, Sougraigne, Bugarach, Saint-Louis-et-Parahou, Lapradelle-Puilaurens, Gincla, Montfort-sur-Boulzane
  - In the Pyrénées-Orientales département : Caudiès-de-Fenouillèdes, Fuilla, Mosset, Conat, Rabouillet, Villefranche-de-Conflent, Serdinya, Escaro, Sahorre, Py, Prats-de-Mollo-la-Preste

== See also ==
- Paris Meridian
