= Mainvilliers =

Mainvilliers may refer to the following places in France:

- Mainvilliers, Eure-et-Loir, a commune in the Eure-et-Loir department
- Mainvilliers, Loiret, a commune in the Loiret department
