= Coudray =

Coudray may refer to:

== Places ==
- Coudray, Eure, France
- Coudray, Loiret, France
- Coudray, Mayenne, France
- Coudray-au-Perche, in the Eure-et-Loir département, France
- Coudray-Rabut, in the Calvados département, France
- Le Coudray, in the Eure-et-Loir département, France
- Le Coudray-Macouard, in the Maine-et-Loire département, France
- Le Coudray-Montceaux, in the Essonne département, France
- Le Coudray-Saint-Germer, in the Oise département, France
- Le Coudray-sur-Thelle, in the Oise département, France

== People with the surname ==
- Clemens Wenzeslaus Coudray (1775–1845), German neoclassical architect
- François Coudray (1678–1727) French sculptor
- Georges Coudray (1902–1998) French politician
- Tiana Coudray (born 1988) American equestrian and dancer

== Other uses ==
- 27712 Coudray, a main-belt asteroid
