= Aragon, Aude =

Commune in Occitanie, France

Aragon
- Commune
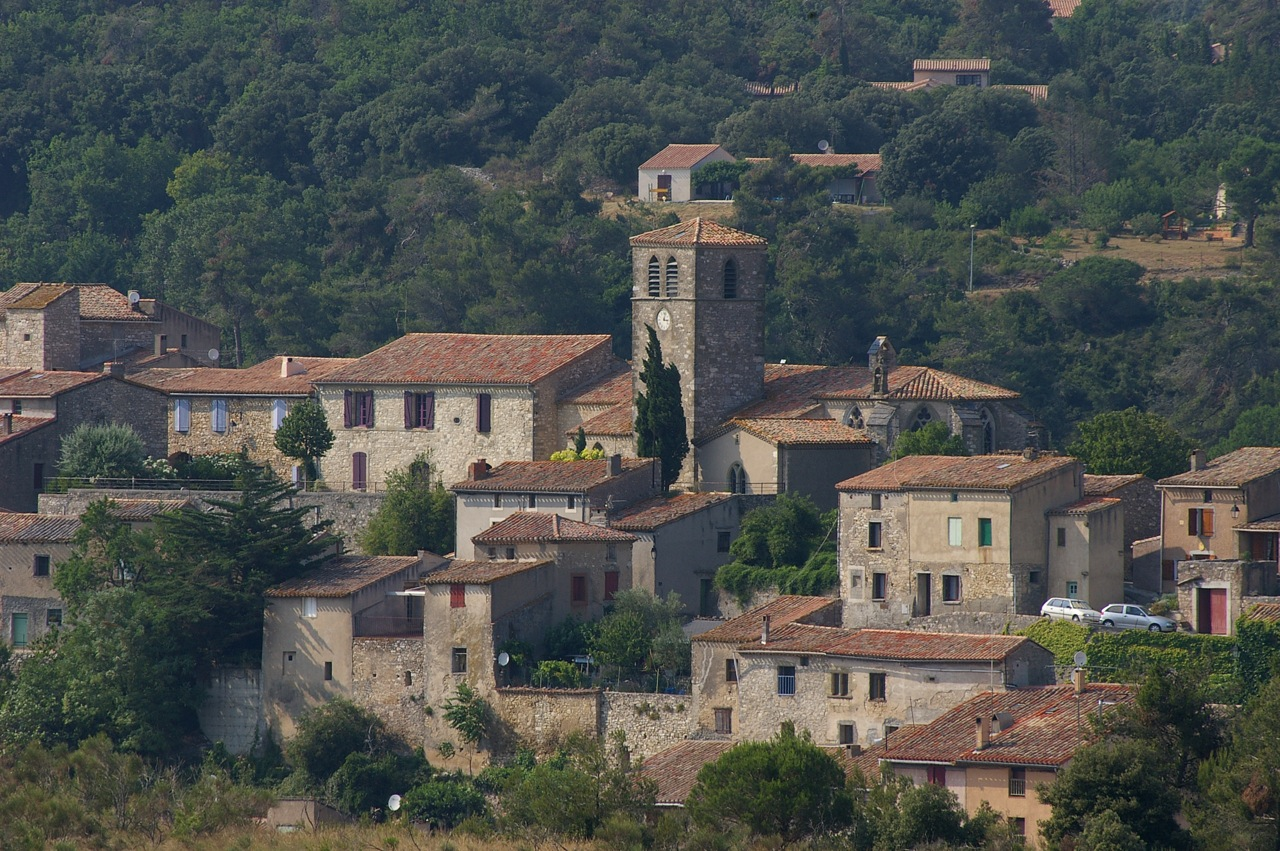
- General View of Aragon

- Coat of arms
- Location of Aragon
- Location within France Location within Occitanie
- Coordinates: 43°17′49″N 2°18′55″E
- Country: France
- Region: Occitania
- Department: Aude
- Arrondissement: Carcassonne
- Canton: La Vallée de l'Orbiel
- Intercommunality: Carcassonne Agglo

Government
  - Mayor (2020–2026): Didier Sie
- Area^{1}: 20.56 km^{2} (7.94 sq mi)
- Elevation: 190 m (620 ft)
- Highest elevation: 346 m (1,135 ft)
- Lowest elevation: 136 m (446 ft)
- Population (2023): 487
  - Density: 23.7/km^{2} (61.3/sq mi)
- Time zone: UTC+01:00 (CET)
  - Summer (DST): UTC+02:00 (CEST)
- INSEE/Postal code: 11011 /11600
- ^{1} French Land Register data, which excludes lakes, ponds, glaciers > 1 km^{2} (0.386 sq mi or 247 acres) and river estuaries.

Aragon (French pronunciation: [aʁaɡɔ̃]; Occitan: Argon) is a commune in the Aude department in the Occitanie region of southern France.

== Geography ==
Aragon is a commune in the Carcassonne urban area on the Green Meridian in Cabardès. The village is built on a rocky outcrop overlooking the Trapel and Vallette streams.

The commune is located some 13 km north of Carcassonne and 6 km east of Montolieu. Access is by the D203 road from Fraisse-Cabardès in the north-west passing through the length of the commune to the village then continuing south to Pennautier. There is also the D935 going south-east from the village to Villegailhenc. The north of the commune is quite rugged and heavily forested while the south of the commune is farmland with some patches of forest.

The Ruisseau de Trapel flows from the north-west passing north of the village and gathering tributaries as it continues south-east to join the Canal du Midi south of Les Pradels. The Ruisseau de la Vallette also flows from further north-west to pass the village on the southern side before joining the Trapel. Numerous other streams rise in the south of the commune and flow south-east. In the north-east the Ruisseau de Vallouviere flows south-east and joins the Trapel south-east of the commune.

== Toponymy ==
The town is also known as Aragon-en-Cabardès but this name is not so easy to use. The name could come from the Kingdom of Aragon and dates from the 11th century but some propose Celtic or Greco-Celtic origins meaning a place near a battle or near the wilderness.

- Hamlets and places: Bancalis, la Borde Neuve, Cabrol, les Capitelles, le Chalet, Combe Petite, Combe Grande, Font de l'Orme, Font en Gui, la Croze (ruins), Garille, Grambaud, La Grange, le Moulin, Moulin de Vignore, Pech Marie, Rude Mine, la Valette d'Artoul, and la Valouvière.
- Topographical feature: la Crose (329m), Montpeyrous (219m), Mourral de las Piouses (161m), and Pech Jalabert (322m).
- Hydrology:
  - Water Sources: Font de Clavel, Fontaine Blanche, and Fount de Cussou.
  - Streams: Ruissseau de Garille, de Gazel, de la Combe Auzine, de la Combe Bertrand, de la Combe des Baysses, de la Combe Petite, de la Valette, de Malmajou, de Malrégas, de Pratjon, de Racaudy, de Trapel, de Vallouvière, des Joies, and du Berger.
- Forests: les Affenadous, Bois de Moure, Bosc de Bez, le Carrétal de la Sourde, la Crose, Montpeyrous, Pech Jalabert, le Pin des Balles, and Plaine de Montolieu.
- Vineyards: Magrie and le Sidobre.
- Pathways: Chemin de la Moulinasse and Chemin de la Plaine de la Bouiche.

Other Places: Champ du Saule, Clapier d'Amen, Clapier Rouge, l'Espinal, la Croix du Carabier, Larjale, le Malrégas, les Précieuses, Mont Feste, Mourrel de la Crose, Mourrel Redon, Pechicous, Plateau d'Aragon, and Pratjon.

== History ==
There are remains from the Bronze Age (2000 BC) which were found in a cave. In 1820 a fragment with a Gallo-Roman funerary inscription was discovered.

In the 10th century Aragon belonged to the Abbey of Montolieu but, from the beginning of the 12th century, traces of the Lords of Aragon have been found. They then had large areas of land but they seem to have followed the Cathar cause. They were thus deprived of their property by the Inquisition although they received financial compensation. Their fief was then shared between the Royal Domain and the bishopric of Carcassonne but, even without the protection of lords, Catharism still survived in the village.

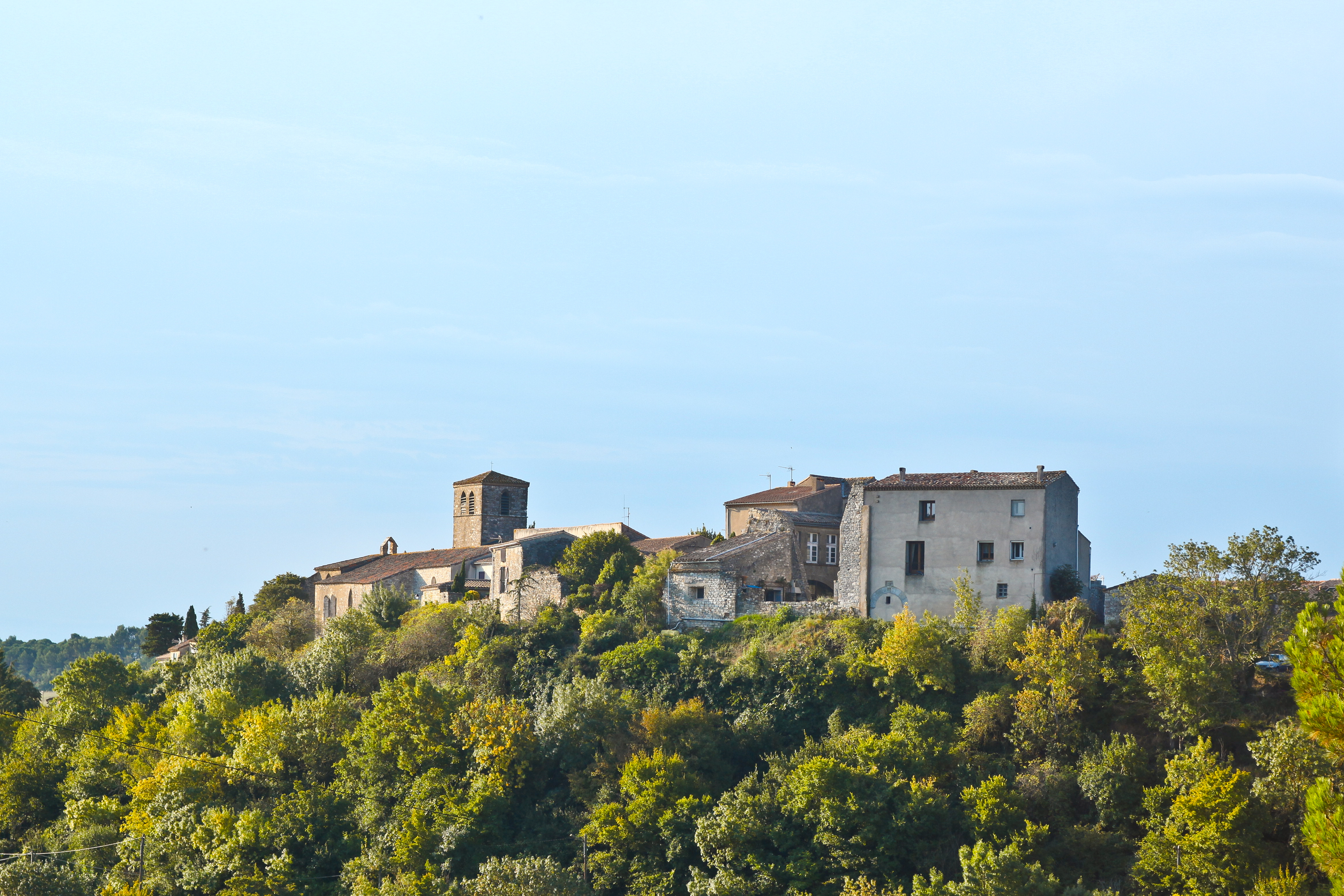
Aragon Village

In 1575 and in 1588 the Huguenots occupied the village. The Viscount of Turenne recaptured it in 1580.

The village experienced a period of prosperity in the late 18th century when looms for supplying the clothiers at Carcassonne brought additional revenue to the community.

In the 17th century, the lordship of Aragon belonged to Sebastian de Maurel, whose daughter, Anne de Maurel d'Aragon, was married in 1726 at Aragon to Pierre de Bancalis, giving birth to the noble family Bancalis de Maurel d'Aragon.

=== Heraldry ===
| Arms of Aragon | Blazon: Argent, a bend of Sable. |

== Administration ==
List of Successive Mayors

Mayors from the French Revolution to 1929

| From | To | Name |
|---|---|---|
| 1790 | 1793 | Pierre Duran |
| 1793 | 1796 | Etienne Escande |
| 1796 | 1796 | Jean Duran |
| 1796 | 1798 | Jean Molinier |
| 1798 | 1800 | Vital Resseguier |
| 1800 | 1806 | Gabriel Beteille |
| 1806 | 1808 | Simon Rousseau |
| 1808 | 1811 | Mathieu Averous |
| 1811 | 1815 | Vital Resseguier |
| 1815 | 1816 | Pierre Pontet |
| 1816 | 1821 | Germaine Pontet |
| 1821 | 1826 | Jean Averous |
| 1826 | 1848 | Germain Pontet |
| 1848 | 1855 | François Escande |
| 1855 | 1864 | Mathieu Averous |
| 1864 | 1871 | Claude Ressiguier |
| 1871 | 1874 | Guillaume Lapeyre |
| 1874 | 1876 | Mathieu Averous |
| 1876 | 1876 | Jules Aribaud |
| 1876 | 1880 | François Barthe |
| 1880 | 1881 | Antoine Tiquet |
| 1881 | 1884 | Jules Aribaud |
| 1884 | 1893 | Louis Satge |
| 1893 | 1894 | François Barthe |
| 1894 | 1904 | Jules Aribaud |
| 1904 | 1918 | Gilbert Durand |
| 1918 | 1919 | François Cayrol |
| 1919 | 1924 | Baptiste Bousquet |
| 1924 | 1925 | Bernard Loubiere |
| 1925 | 1929 | Paul Calmet |

Mayors from 1929

| From | To | Name |
|---|---|---|
| 1929 | 1965 | Paul Blanc |
| 1965 | 1995 | André Bru |
| 1995 | 2008 | Serge Loubet |
| 2008 | 2014 | Bernard Bru |
| 2014 | 2026 | Didier Sie |

== Demography ==
The inhabitants of the commune are known as Aragonais or Aragonaises in French.

Historical population

| Year | Pop. | ±% p.a. |
|---|---|---|
| 1793 | 427 | — |
| 1821 | 708 | +1.82% |
| 1846 | 676 | −0.18% |
| 1872 | 604 | −0.43% |
| 1901 | 496 | −0.68% |
| 1926 | 469 | −0.22% |
| 1946 | 374 | −1.13% |
| 1962 | 334 | −0.70% |
| 1968 | 304 | −1.56% |

| Year | Pop. | ±% p.a. |
|---|---|---|
| 1975 | 306 | +0.09% |
| 1982 | 374 | +2.91% |
| 1990 | 389 | +0.49% |
| 1999 | 453 | +1.71% |
| 2007 | 435 | −0.51% |
| 2012 | 415 | −0.94% |
| 2017 | 433 | +0.85% |
| 2023 | 487 | +1.98% |

Source: EHESS and INSEE

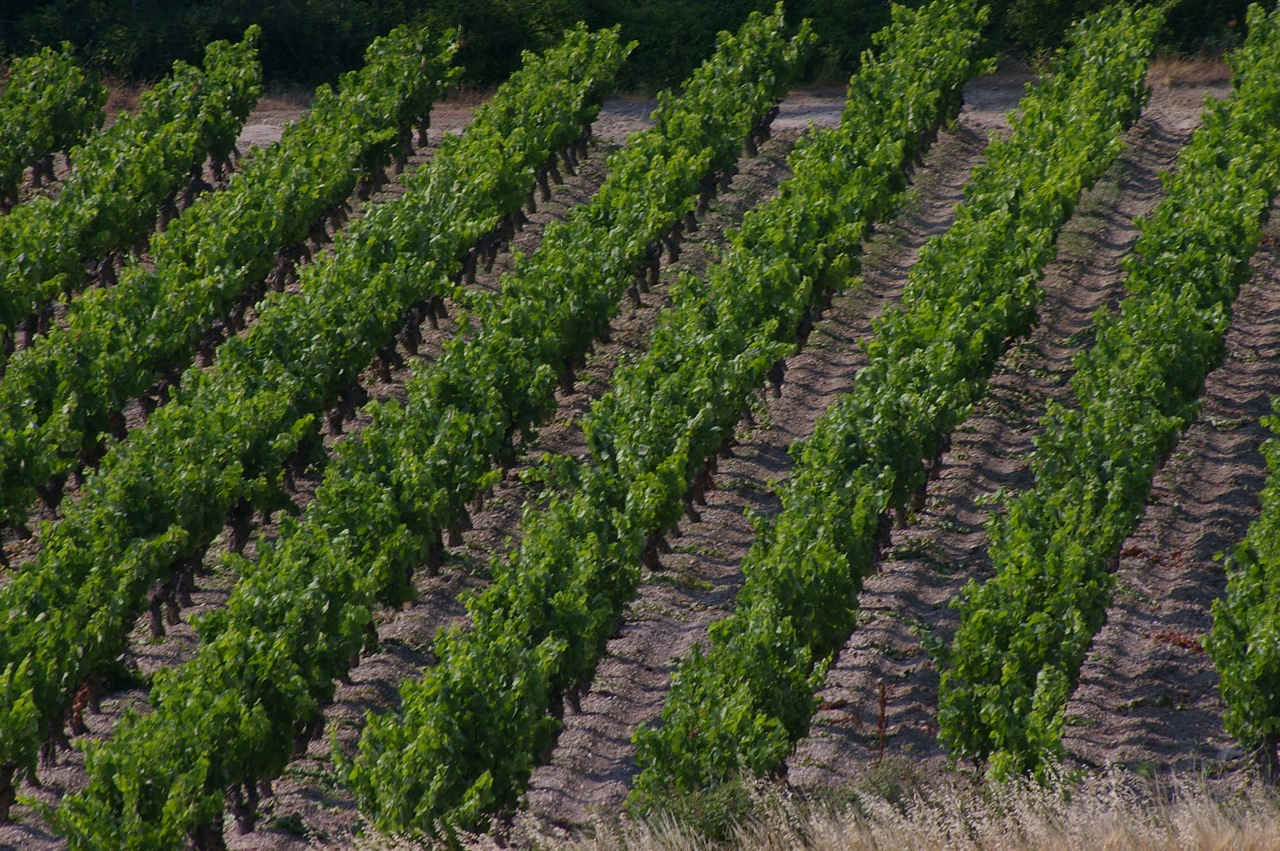
A Vineyard at Aragon

== Economy ==
Aragon is part of the Cabardès AOC

== Culture and heritage ==
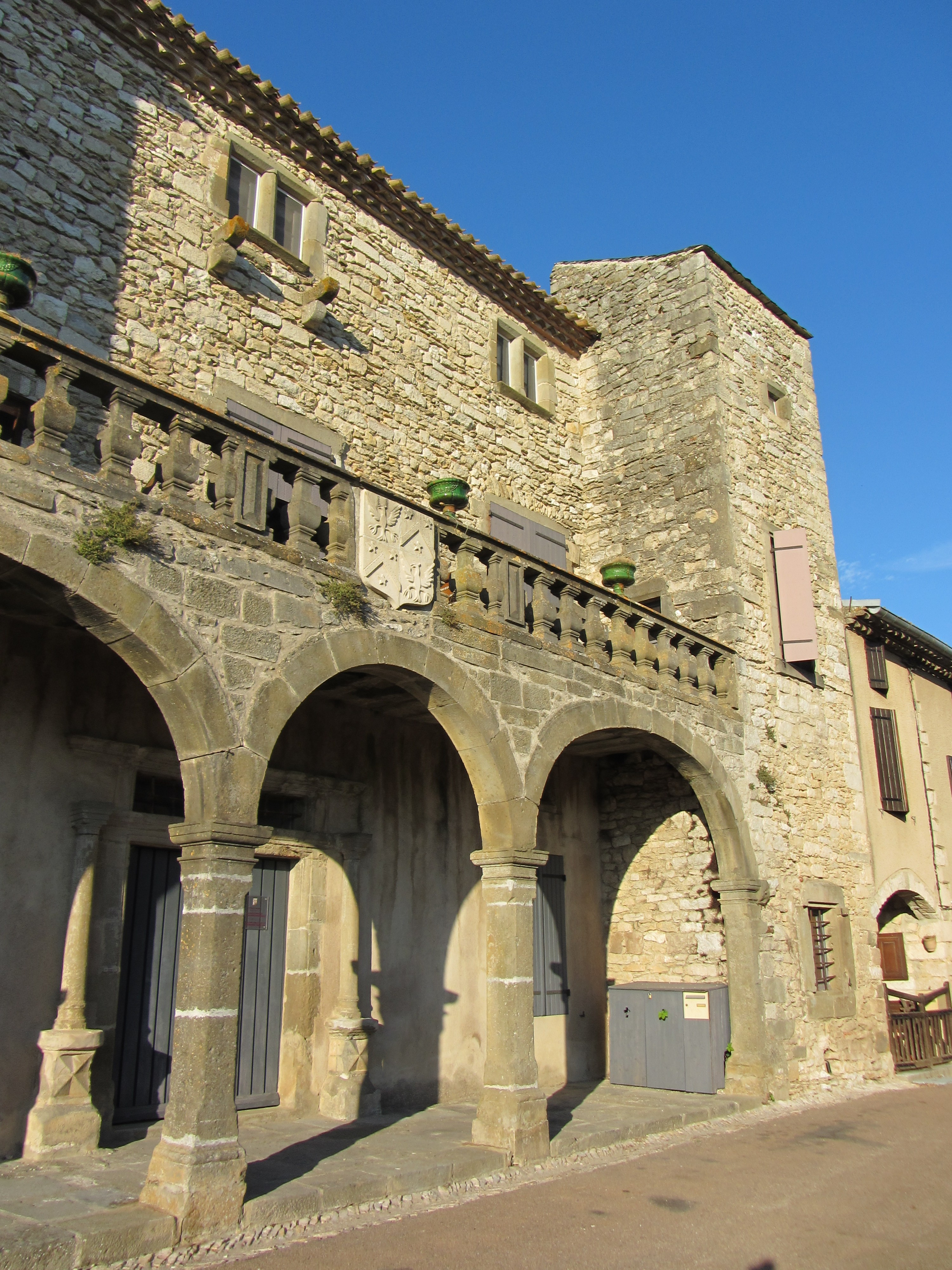
The Chateau

=== Civil heritage ===
- A Chateau (16th century) is registered as an historical monument.
- The Espace Pierre Sèche
- An Old winery tools Museum

=== Religious heritage ===
Two sites are registered as historical monuments:

- A Wayside Cross (16th century)
- The Church of Sainte-Marie (14th century)

== See also ==
- Communes of the Aude department
