= Bray-Saint Aignan =

- Commune
- Location of Bray-Saint Aignan
- Location within France Location within Centre-Val de Loire
- Coordinates: 47°49′52″N 2°22′05″E
- Country: France
- Region: Centre-Val de Loire
- Department: Loiret
- Arrondissement: Orléans
- Canton: Sully-sur-Loire
- Intercommunality: Val de Sully

Government
  - Mayor (2020–2026): Danielle Gressette
- Area^{1}: 26.16 km^{2} (10.10 sq mi)
- Population (2023): 1,803
  - Density: 68.92/km^{2} (178.5/sq mi)
- Time zone: UTC+01:00 (CET)
  - Summer (DST): UTC+02:00 (CEST)
- INSEE/Postal code: 45051 /45460
- ^{1} French Land Register data, which excludes lakes, ponds, glaciers > 1 km^{2} (0.386 sq mi or 247 acres) and river estuaries.

Bray-Saint Aignan (French pronunciation: [bʁɛ sɛ̃.t‿ɛɲɑ̃]) is a commune in the department of Loiret, central France. The municipality was established on 1 January 2017 by merger of the former communes of Bray-en-Val (the seat) and Saint-Aignan-des-Gués.

== See also ==
- Communes of the Loiret department
