= Darvoy =

- Commune
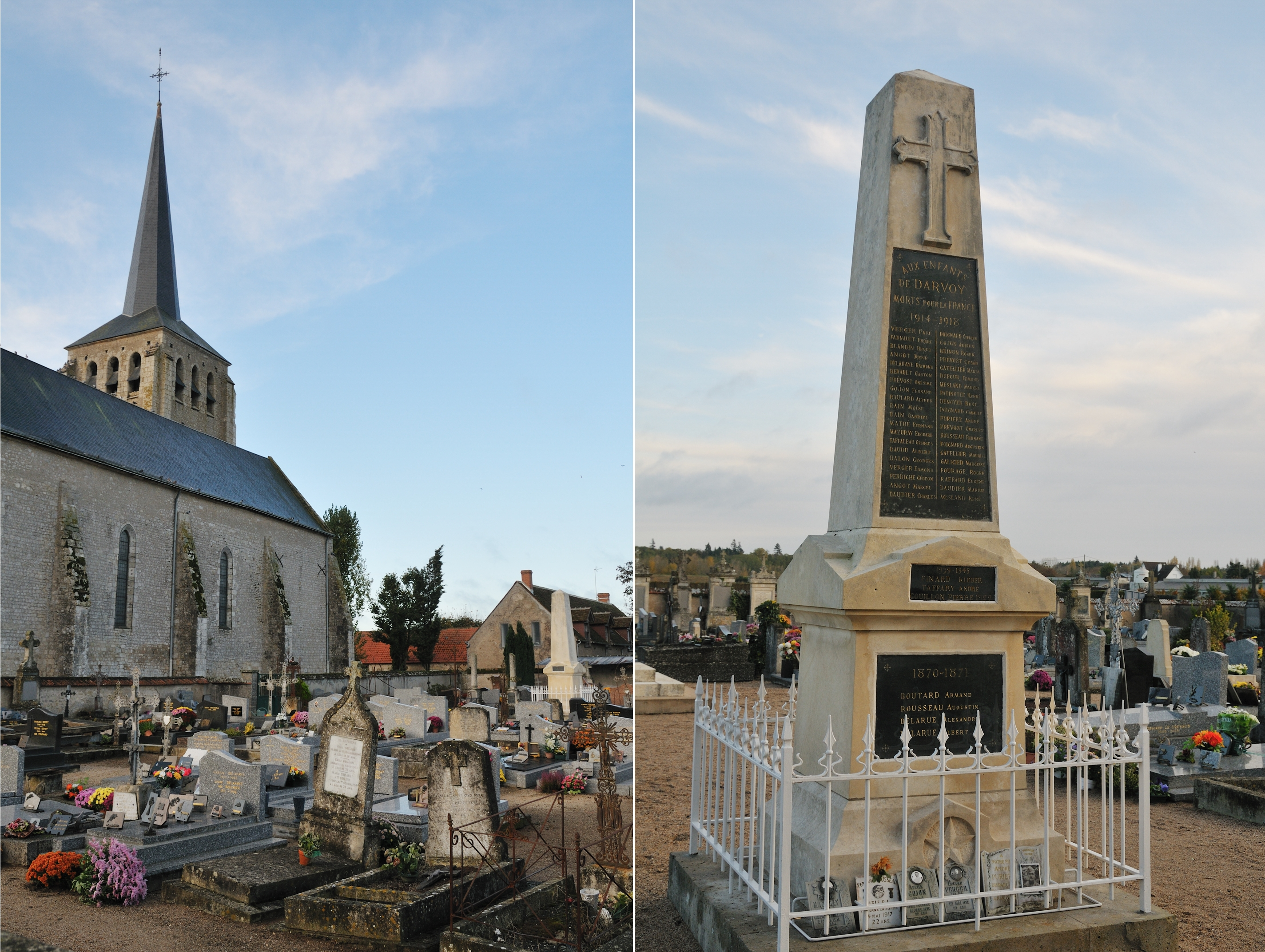
- The church and war memorial in Darvoy

- Coat of arms
- Location of Darvoy
- Location within France Location within Centre-Val de Loire
- Coordinates: 47°51′29″N 2°06′00″E
- Country: France
- Region: Centre-Val de Loire
- Department: Loiret
- Arrondissement: Orléans
- Canton: Châteauneuf-sur-Loire
- Intercommunality: CC des Loges

Government
  - Mayor (2020–2026): Marc Brynhole
- Area^{1}: 8.58 km^{2} (3.31 sq mi)
- Highest elevation: 103 m (338 ft)
- Lowest elevation: 98 m (322 ft)
- Population (2023): 1,930
  - Density: 225/km^{2} (583/sq mi)
- Demonym: Darvoisiens
- Time zone: UTC+01:00 (CET)
  - Summer (DST): UTC+02:00 (CEST)
- INSEE/Postal code: 45123 /45150
- Website: www.darvoy.fr
- ^{1} French Land Register data, which excludes lakes, ponds, glaciers > 1 km^{2} (0.386 sq mi or 247 acres) and river estuaries.

Darvoy (French pronunciation: [daʁvwa]) is a commune in the Loiret department in north-central France.

== Etymology ==
Darvoy likely comes from the Celtic Der or Dervos (oak), or Dervetum (oak).

== Geography ==
Darvoy is in the Loire Valley, 17 km east of Orléans, 2 km south-west of Jargeau, and 122 km south of Paris. Darvoy is part of the Central Region and is part of the Jargeau canton. Darvoy is 101 meters above sea level.

== See also ==
- Communes of the Loiret department
