= Canton of Chantilly =

Canton of France

Coordinates: 49.19°N 2.47°E

- Canton
- Situation of the canton of Chantilly in the department of Oise
- Country: France
- Region: Hauts-de-France
- Department: Oise
- No. of communes: {{{nbcomm}}}
- Population (2023): 42,504
- INSEE code: 6003

The canton of Chantilly is an administrative division of the Oise department, northern France. Its borders were modified at the French canton reorganisation which came into effect in March 2015. Its seat is in Chantilly.

It consists of the following communes:

1. Apremont
2. Boran-sur-Oise
3. Chantilly
4. Coye-la-Forêt
5. Crouy-en-Thelle
6. Gouvieux
7. Lamorlaye
8. Le Mesnil-en-Thelle
9. Morangles
10. Saint-Maximin
