= Le Mesnil-en-Thelle =

- Commune
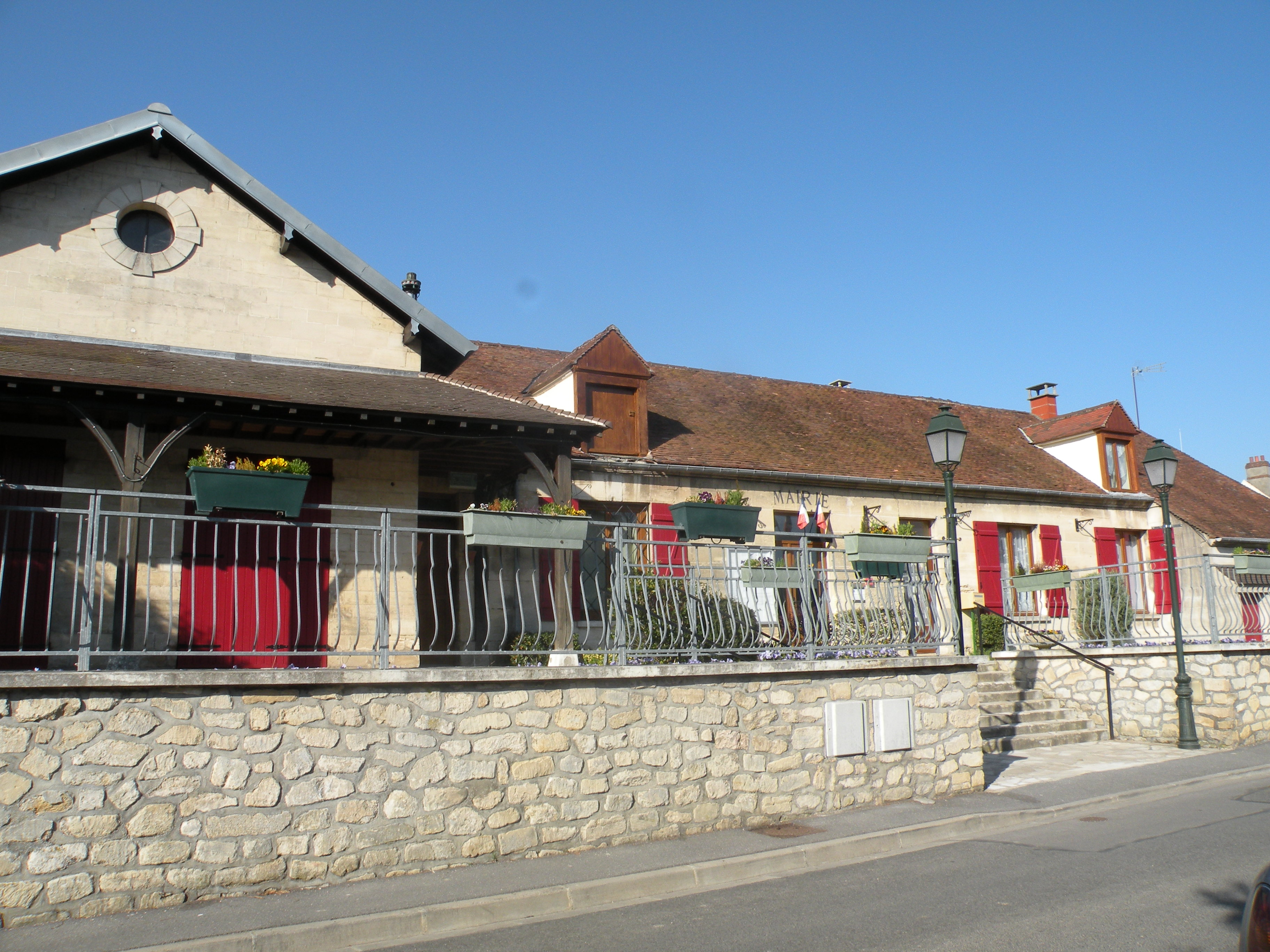
- The town hall in Le Mesnil-en-Thelle

- Coat of arms
- Location of Le Mesnil-en-Thelle
- Location within France Location within Hauts-de-France
- Coordinates: 49°10′44″N 2°17′11″E
- Country: France
- Region: Hauts-de-France
- Department: Oise
- Arrondissement: Senlis
- Canton: Chantilly

Government
  - Mayor (2023–2026): Nadia Moria
- Area^{1}: 6.09 km^{2} (2.35 sq mi)
- Elevation: 45 m (148 ft)
- Highest elevation: 101 m (331 ft)
- Lowest elevation: 29 m (95 ft)
- Population (2023): 2,439
  - Density: 400/km^{2} (1,040/sq mi)
- Time zone: UTC+01:00 (CET)
  - Summer (DST): UTC+02:00 (CEST)
- INSEE/Postal code: 60398 /60530
- ^{1} French Land Register data, which excludes lakes, ponds, glaciers > 1 km^{2} (0.386 sq mi or 247 acres) and river estuaries.

Le Mesnil-en-Thelle (French pronunciation: [lə menil ɑ̃ tɛl]) is a commune in the Oise department in northern France.

== Population ==
Historical population
Year	Pop.	±% p.a.
1968	824	—
1975	1,310	+6.85%
1982	1,516	+2.11%
1990	2,118	+4.27%
1999	2,089	−0.15%
2007	2,297	+1.19%
2012	2,296	−0.01%
2017	2,229	−0.59%
2023	2,439	+1.51%
Source: INSEE

== See also ==
- Communes of the Oise department
