= Combreux =

- Commune
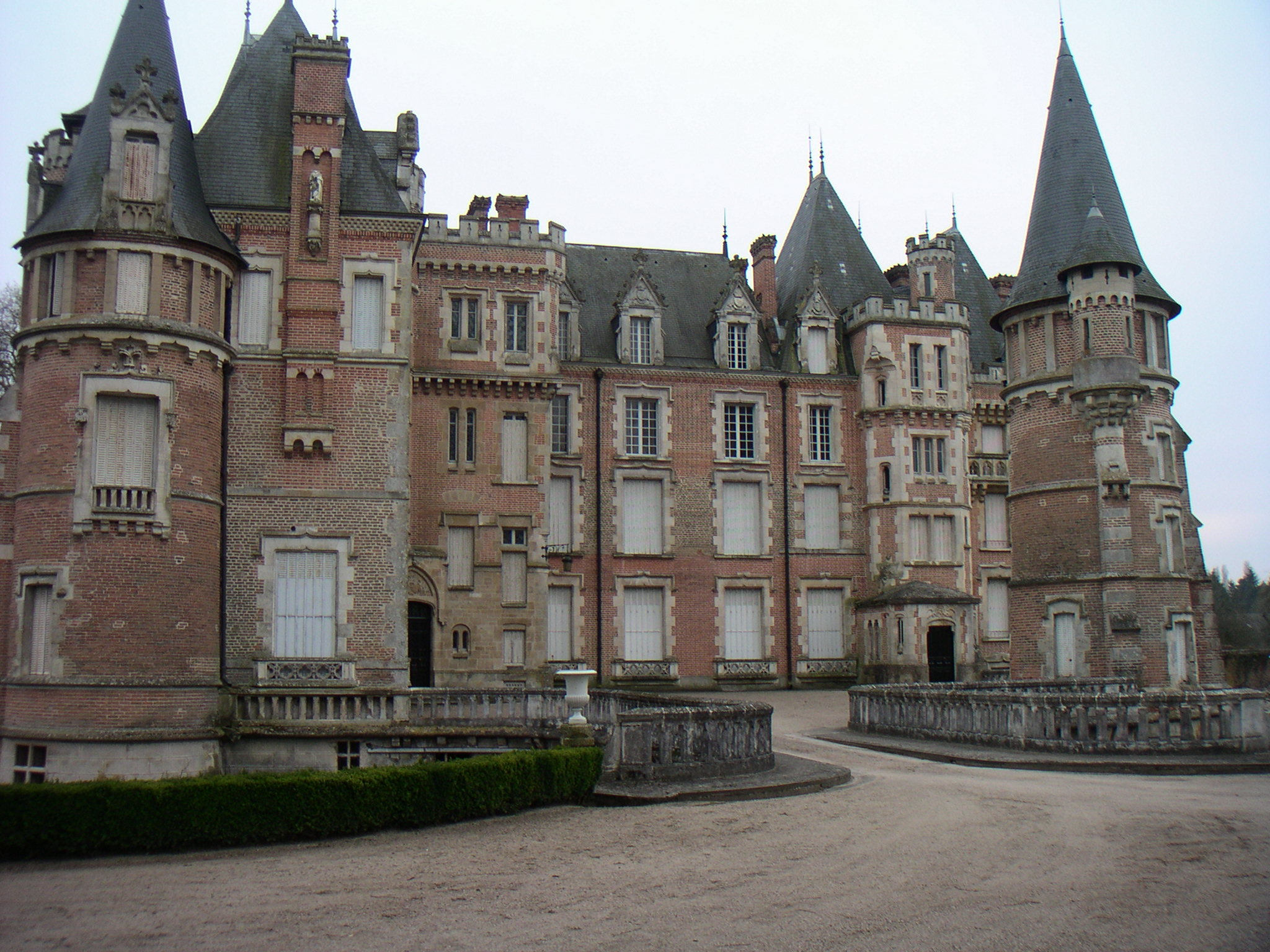
- The château in Combreux

- Coat of arms
- Location of Combreux
- Location within France Location within Centre-Val de Loire
- Coordinates: 47°57′23″N 2°18′10″E
- Country: France
- Region: Centre-Val de Loire
- Department: Loiret
- Arrondissement: Orléans
- Canton: Châteauneuf-sur-Loire
- Intercommunality: CC des Loges

Government
  - Mayor (2020–2026): Philibert de La Rochefoucauld
- Area^{1}: 12.67 km^{2} (4.89 sq mi)
- Highest elevation: 147 m (482 ft)
- Lowest elevation: 115 m (377 ft)
- Population (2023): 266
  - Density: 21.0/km^{2} (54.4/sq mi)
- Demonym: Combreusiens
- Time zone: UTC+01:00 (CET)
  - Summer (DST): UTC+02:00 (CEST)
- INSEE/Postal code: 45101 /45530
- ^{1} French Land Register data, which excludes lakes, ponds, glaciers > 1 km^{2} (0.386 sq mi or 247 acres) and river estuaries.

Combreux (French pronunciation: [kɔ̃bʁø]) is a commune in the Loiret department in north-central France.

== See also ==
- Communes of the Loiret department
