= Canton of Châteauneuf-sur-Loire =

Coordinates: 47.87°N 2.22°E

The canton of Châteauneuf-sur-Loire is an administrative division of the Loiret department, central France. Its borders were modified at the French canton reorganisation which came into effect in March 2015. Its seat is in Châteauneuf-sur-Loire.

It consists of the following communes:

1. Bouzy-la-Forêt
2. Châteauneuf-sur-Loire
3. Combreux
4. Darvoy
5. Donnery
6. Fay-aux-Loges
7. Ingrannes
8. Jargeau
9. Saint-Denis-de-l'Hôtel
10. Saint-Martin-d'Abbat
11. Seichebrières
12. Sully-la-Chapelle
13. Sury-aux-Bois
14. Vitry-aux-Loges
