= Épanchoir de Foucaud =

Botanical garden in Languedoc-Roussillon, France

Coordinates: 43.2276°N 2.3200°E

The Épanchoir de Foucaud is a small botanical garden located in Pennautier just outside Carcassonne, Aude, Languedoc-Roussillon, France. It contains a collection of Mediterranean plants set about an épanchoir of the Canal du Midi, that is, a spillway for the canal's excess water. The garden is open daily without charge.

== See also ==
- Canal du Midi
- List of botanical gardens in France
