= Serres, Aude =

Commune in Occitanie, France

Serres
- Commune
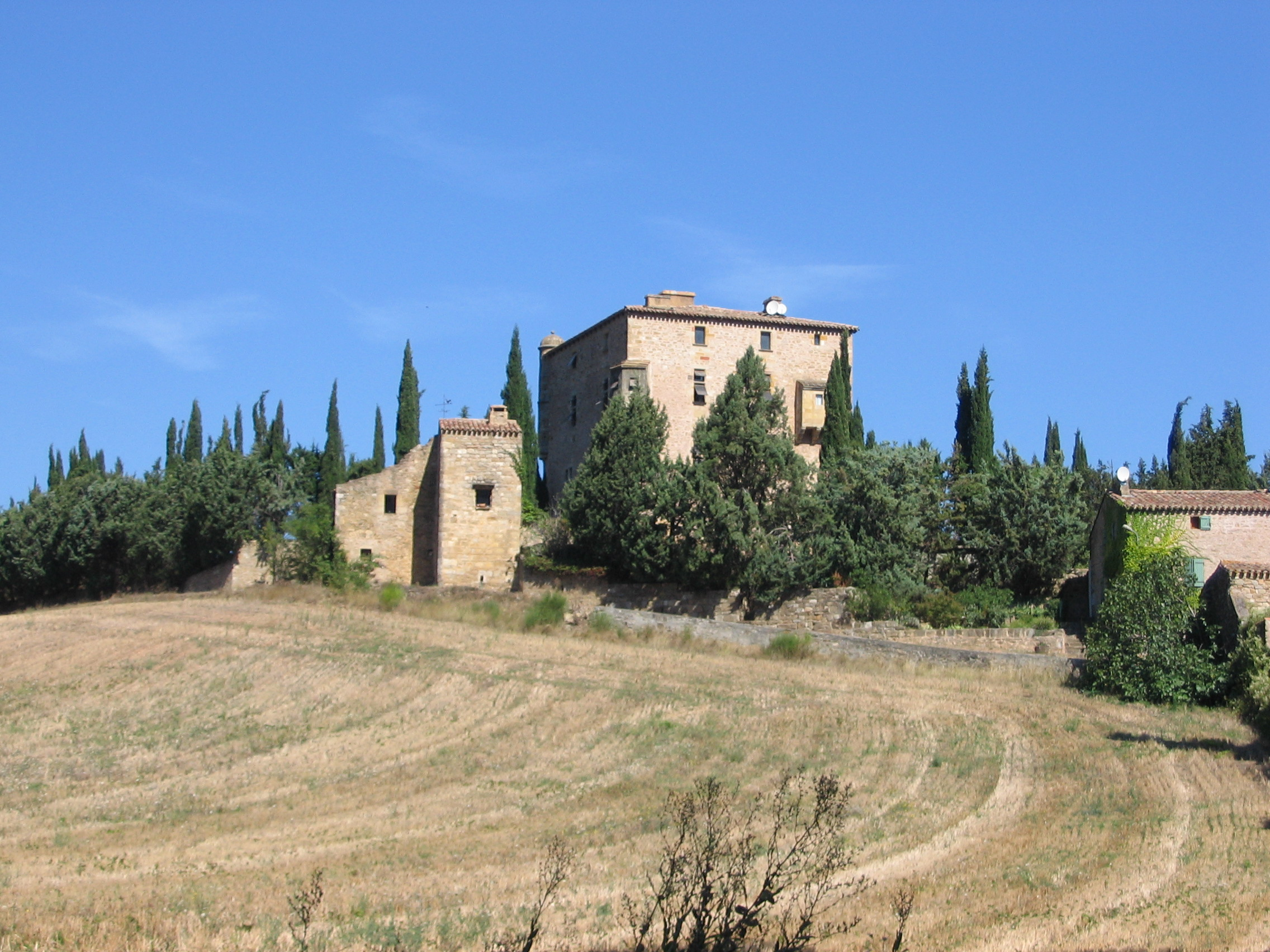
- The chateau in Serres

- Coat of arms
- Location of Serres
- Location within France Location within Occitanie
- Coordinates: 42°56′51″N 2°19′32″E
- Country: France
- Region: Occitania
- Department: Aude
- Arrondissement: Limoux
- Canton: La Haute-Vallée de l'Aude

Government
  - Mayor (2020–2026): Octave Treton
- Area^{1}: 4.06 km^{2} (1.57 sq mi)
- Elevation: 271 m (889 ft)
- Highest elevation: 797 m (2,615 ft)
- Lowest elevation: 259 m (850 ft)
- Population (2023): 89
  - Density: 22/km^{2} (57/sq mi)
- Time zone: UTC+01:00 (CET)
  - Summer (DST): UTC+02:00 (CEST)
- INSEE/Postal code: 11377 /11190
- ^{1} French Land Register data, which excludes lakes, ponds, glaciers > 1 km^{2} (0.386 sq mi or 247 acres) and river estuaries.

Serres (French pronunciation: [sɛʁ]; Occitan: Sèrras) is a commune in the Aude department in southern France.

== Geography ==
The commune is situated on the Route Departmental D613 between Arques and Couiza. Mount Pech Cardou at an altitude of 795 m overlooks Serres village.

== Population ==
Historical population
Year	Pop.	±% p.a.
1968	62	—
1975	72	+2.16%
1982	41	−7.73%
1990	55	+3.74%
1999	58	+0.59%
2007	50	−1.84%
2012	49	−0.40%
2017	65	+5.81%
2023	89	+5.38%
Source: INSEE

== Sights ==
The village has a 16th-century chateau, church dedicated to St Pierre and Tinel wine museum with a 15th-century vaulted wine cellar.

A 17th-century restored bridge over the river Rialsesse has a Méridienne verte ("Green Meridian") marker. Another marker is situated outside the church at the old olive tree.

The patron saint of the village is St. Miguel.

== Economy ==
The area produces Chardonnay, Chenin, Pinot Noir, Carignan and Mauzac grapes used in Blanquette wine. The village has a caveau where Nicolas Therez and Amandine Caruso produce some of Limoux's finest wines.

== See also ==
- Communes of the Aude department
