= Aytua =

Coordinates: 42°32′22″N 2°19′57″E

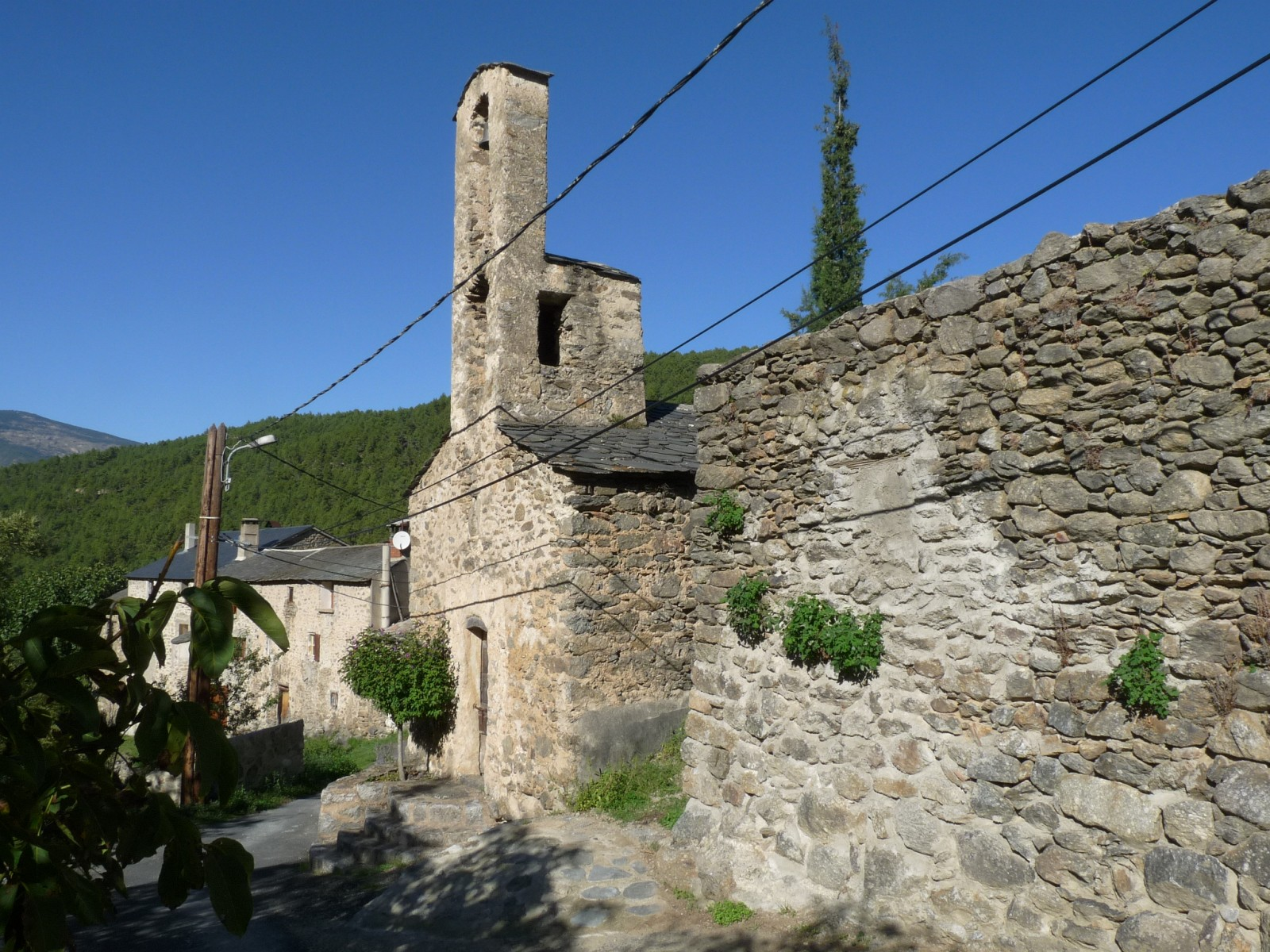
The chapel in Aytua

Aytua (Catalan: Aituà) is a former commune in Pyrénées-Orientales (France).

== Geography ==
Aytua is located east of the commune of Escaro and northwest of Thorrent, another former commune.

== History ==
Originally independent, since 20 March 1822, it is linked with Escaro.

The village was surrounded by facilities for the mining and processing of iron ore, with blast furnaces operated by Givors.

From the beginning of the 20th century, ore was transported by a steam locomotive driven train - manufactured in Germany by the Orenstein & Koppel factories - from the Aytua galleries to the La Vista station. From there, outputs were moved by an incline railway to the village of Serdinya. From Serdinya, it could be further moved via the third-rail, electric railway that came into operation in 1910.

There was a canteen in Aytua, which also served as a dormitory, built after the First World War by the Société des mines d'Aytua, a subsidiary of the Givors blast furnaces.

== Politics and administration ==
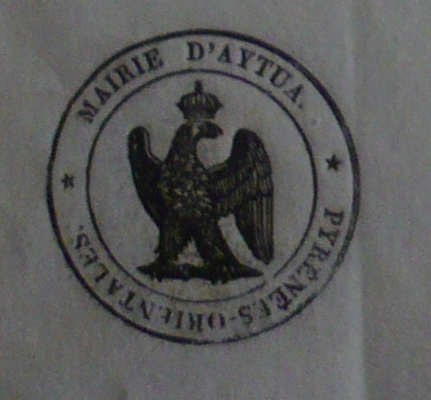
Seal of Aytua (1815)

=== Mayors ===
Mayor	Term start	Term end
Joseph Parent Raulet	?	June 1815
Sébastien Parent	June 1815	?

== Sites of interest ==
- Saint-Christine chapel, from the 16th century.
