= Labrosse, Loiret =

Labrosse
- Part of Le Malesherbois
- Location of Labrosse
- Location within France Location within Centre-Val de Loire
- Coordinates: 48°14′42″N 2°23′35″E
- Country: France
- Region: Centre-Val de Loire
- Department: Loiret
- Arrondissement: Pithiviers
- Canton: Le Malesherbois
- Commune: Le Malesherbois
- Area^{1}: 4.09 km^{2} (1.58 sq mi)
- Highest elevation: 134 m (440 ft)
- Lowest elevation: 106 m (348 ft)
- Population (2022): 95
  - Density: 23/km^{2} (60/sq mi)
- Demonym: Boëssois
- Time zone: UTC+01:00 (CET)
  - Summer (DST): UTC+02:00 (CEST)
- Postal code: 45330
- ^{1} French Land Register data, which excludes lakes, ponds, glaciers > 1 km^{2} (0.386 sq mi or 247 acres) and river estuaries.

Labrosse (French pronunciation: [labʁɔs]) is a former commune in the Loiret department in north-central France. On 1 January 2016, it was merged into the new commune of Le Malesherbois.

== See also ==
- Communes of the Loiret department
