= Seichebrières =

- Commune
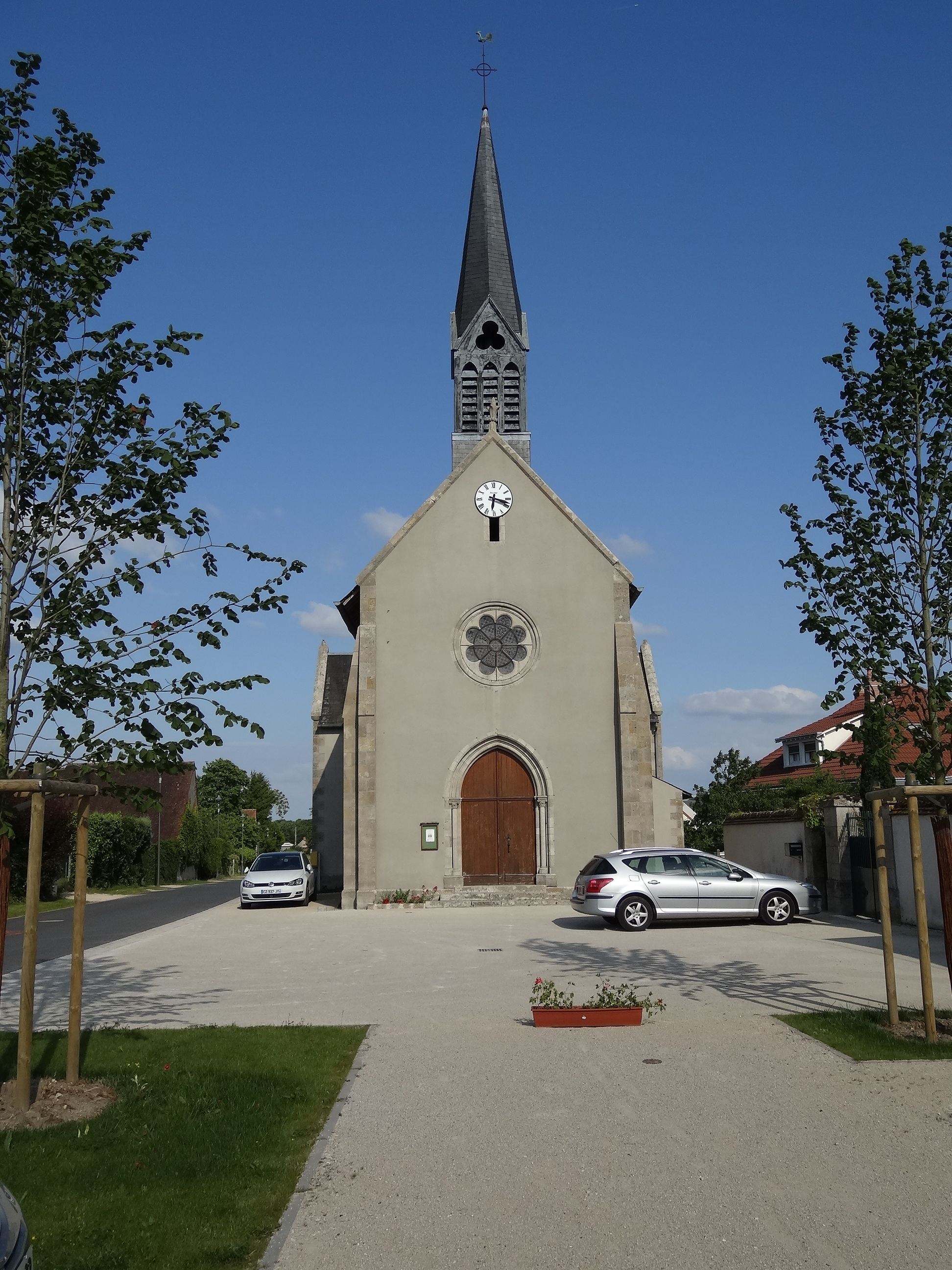
- The church in Sechebrieres
- Location of Seichebrières
- Location within France Location within Centre-Val de Loire
- Coordinates: 47°58′13″N 2°16′12″E
- Country: France
- Region: Centre-Val de Loire
- Department: Loiret
- Arrondissement: Orléans
- Canton: Châteauneuf-sur-Loire
- Intercommunality: CC des Loges

Government
  - Mayor (2020–2026): Philippe Vacher
- Area^{1}: 14.84 km^{2} (5.73 sq mi)
- Highest elevation: 168 m (551 ft)
- Lowest elevation: 120 m (390 ft)
- Population (2023): 218
  - Density: 14.7/km^{2} (38.0/sq mi)
- Demonym: Seichebriérois
- Time zone: UTC+01:00 (CET)
  - Summer (DST): UTC+02:00 (CEST)
- INSEE/Postal code: 45305 /45530
- ^{1} French Land Register data, which excludes lakes, ponds, glaciers > 1 km^{2} (0.386 sq mi or 247 acres) and river estuaries.

Seichebrières (French pronunciation: [sɛʃbʁijɛʁ]) is a commune in the Loiret department in north-central France.

== See also ==
- Communes of the Loiret department
