= Sully-la-Chapelle =

- Commune
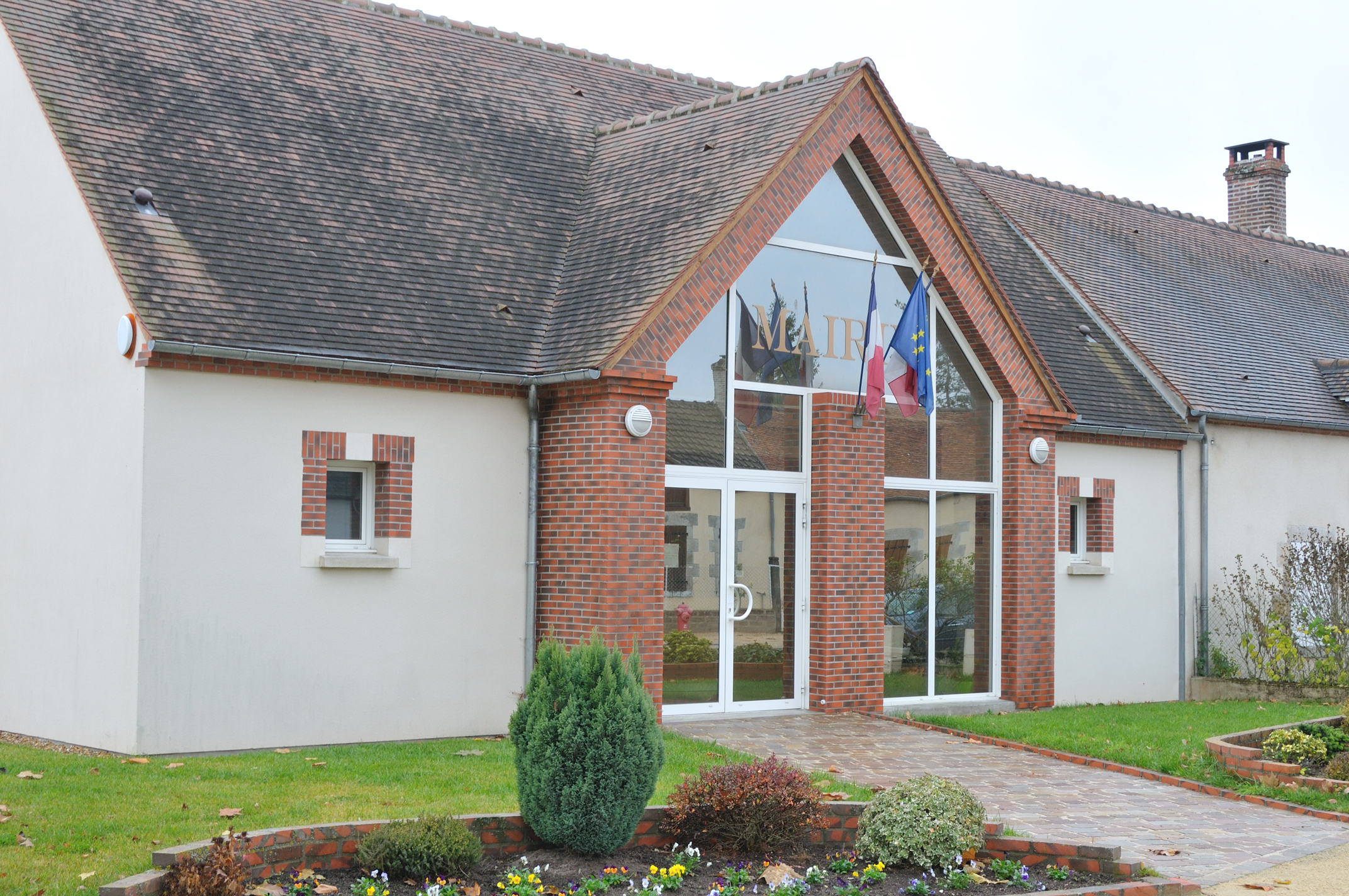
- The town hall in Sully-la-Chapelle
- Location of Sully-la-Chapelle
- Location within France Location within Centre-Val de Loire
- Coordinates: 47°58′35″N 2°10′59″E
- Country: France
- Region: Centre-Val de Loire
- Department: Loiret
- Arrondissement: Orléans
- Canton: Châteauneuf-sur-Loire
- Intercommunality: CC des Loges

Government
  - Mayor (2020–2026): Patrick Morisseau
- Area^{1}: 26.17 km^{2} (10.10 sq mi)
- Highest elevation: 147 m (482 ft)
- Lowest elevation: 106 m (348 ft)
- Population (2023): 464
  - Density: 17.7/km^{2} (45.9/sq mi)
- Time zone: UTC+01:00 (CET)
  - Summer (DST): UTC+02:00 (CEST)
- INSEE/Postal code: 45314 /45450
- ^{1} French Land Register data, which excludes lakes, ponds, glaciers > 1 km^{2} (0.386 sq mi or 247 acres) and river estuaries.

Sully-la-Chapelle (French pronunciation: [syli la ʃapɛl]) is a commune in the Loiret department in north-central France.

== See also ==
- Communes of the Loiret department
