= Le Malesherbois =

- Commune
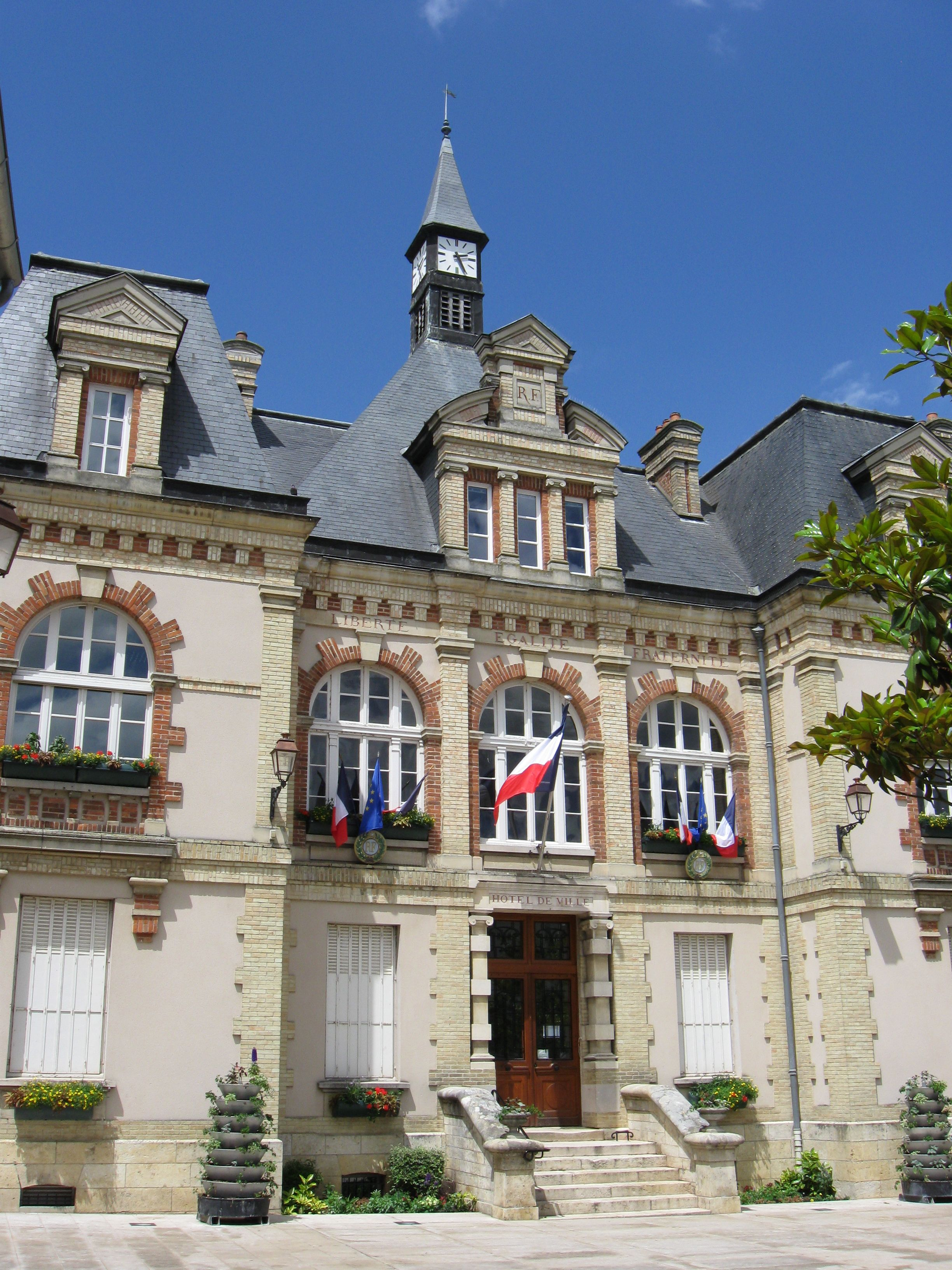
- The town hall in Malesherbes
- Location of Le Malesherbois
- Location within France Location within Centre-Val de Loire
- Coordinates: 48°17′46″N 2°24′58″E
- Country: France
- Region: Centre-Val de Loire
- Department: Loiret
- Arrondissement: Pithiviers
- Canton: Le Malesherbois

Government
  - Mayor (2020–2026): Hervé Gaurat
- Area^{1}: 85.04 km^{2} (32.83 sq mi)
- Population (2023): 8,016
  - Density: 94.26/km^{2} (244.1/sq mi)
- Time zone: UTC+01:00 (CET)
  - Summer (DST): UTC+02:00 (CEST)
- INSEE/Postal code: 45191 /45330, 45300
- ^{1} French Land Register data, which excludes lakes, ponds, glaciers > 1 km^{2} (0.386 sq mi or 247 acres) and river estuaries.

Le Malesherbois (French pronunciation: [lə malzɛʁbwa]) is a commune in the Loiret department of north-central France. The municipality was established on 1 January 2016 by merger of the former communes of Malesherbes, Coudray, Labrosse, Mainvilliers, Manchecourt, Nangeville and Orveau-Bellesauve.

== Population ==
Population data refer to the commune in its geography as of January 2025.

Historical population
Year	Pop.	±% p.a.
1968	4,148	—
1975	5,109	+3.02%
1982	6,259	+2.94%
1990	7,361	+2.05%
1999	7,675	+0.47%
2007	7,867	+0.31%
2012	8,121	+0.64%
2017	8,201	+0.20%
2023	8,016	−0.38%
Source: INSEE

== See also ==
- Communes of the Loiret department
