= Boran-sur-Oise =

- Commune
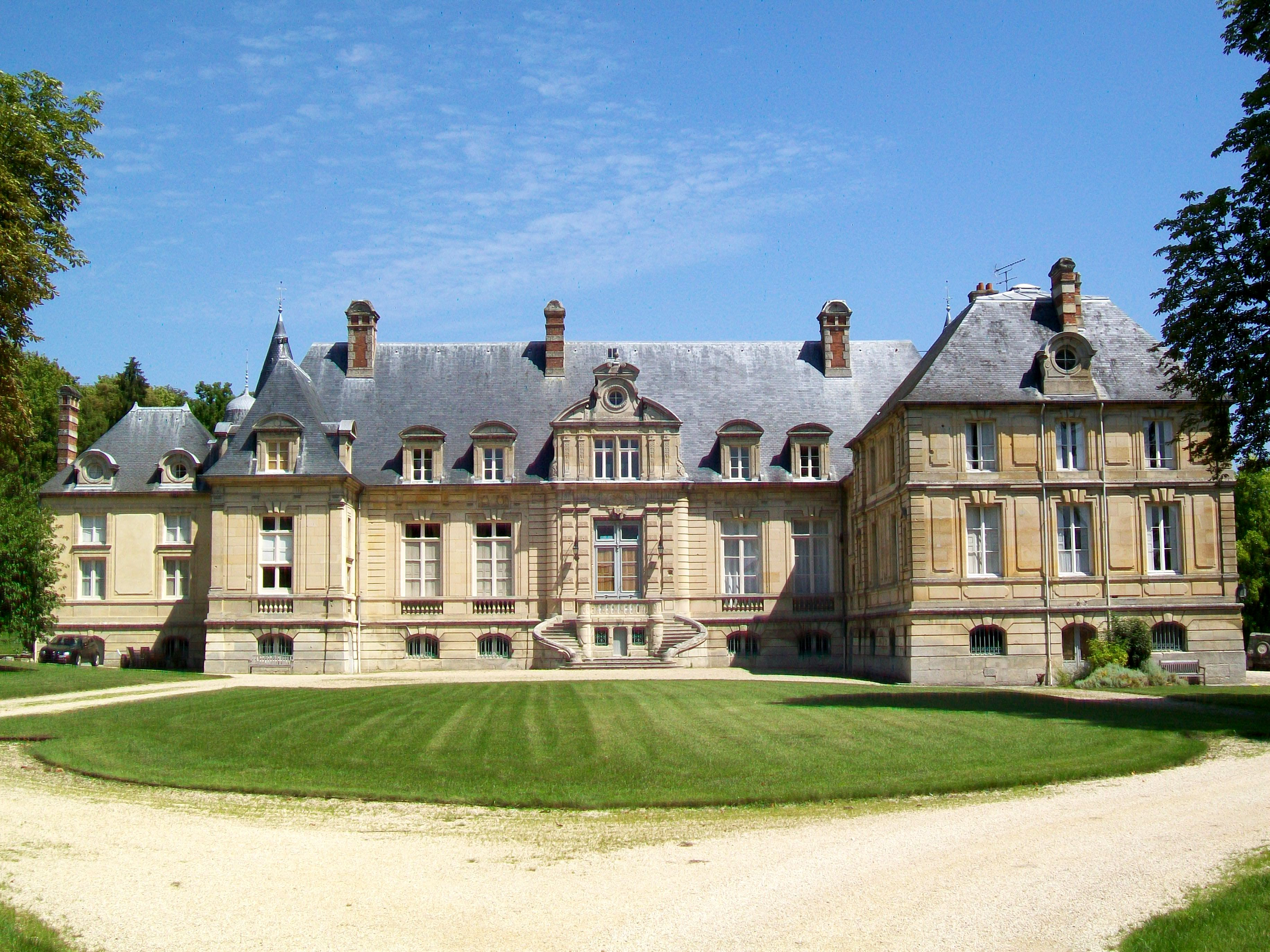
- The chateau in Boran-sur-Oise

- Coat of arms
- Location of Boran-sur-Oise
- Location within France Location within Hauts-de-France
- Coordinates: 49°10′00″N 2°21′34″E
- Country: France
- Region: Hauts-de-France
- Department: Oise
- Arrondissement: Senlis
- Canton: Chantilly

Government
  - Mayor (2020–2026): Jean-Jacques Dumortier
- Area^{1}: 11.25 km^{2} (4.34 sq mi)
- Highest elevation: 103 m (338 ft)
- Lowest elevation: 24 m (79 ft)
- Population (2023): 2,135
  - Density: 189.8/km^{2} (491.5/sq mi)
- Time zone: UTC+01:00 (CET)
  - Summer (DST): UTC+02:00 (CEST)
- INSEE/Postal code: 60086 /60820
- ^{1} French Land Register data, which excludes lakes, ponds, glaciers > 1 km^{2} (0.386 sq mi or 247 acres) and river estuaries.

Boran-sur-Oise (French pronunciation: [bɔʁɑ̃ syʁ waz], literally Boran on Oise) is a commune in the Oise department in northern France.

== Population ==
Historical population

Year	Pop.	±% p.a.
1793	781	—
1821	824	+0.19%
1846	789	−0.17%
1872	766	−0.11%
1901	796	+0.13%
1926	985	+0.86%
1946	1,019	+0.17%
1962	1,474	+2.33%
1968	1,579	+1.15%

Year	Pop.	±% p.a.
1975	1,606	+0.24%
1982	1,968	+2.95%
1990	2,141	+1.06%
1999	2,123	−0.09%
2007	2,108	−0.09%
2012	2,104	−0.04%
2017	2,165	+0.57%
2023	2,135	−0.23%

Source: EHESS and INSEE (1968-2023)

== Notable people ==
- Gérard Paul Deshayes (1795–1875), geologist and conchologist, died in Boran-sur-Oise

== See also ==
- Communes of the Oise department
