= Sury-aux-Bois =

- Commune
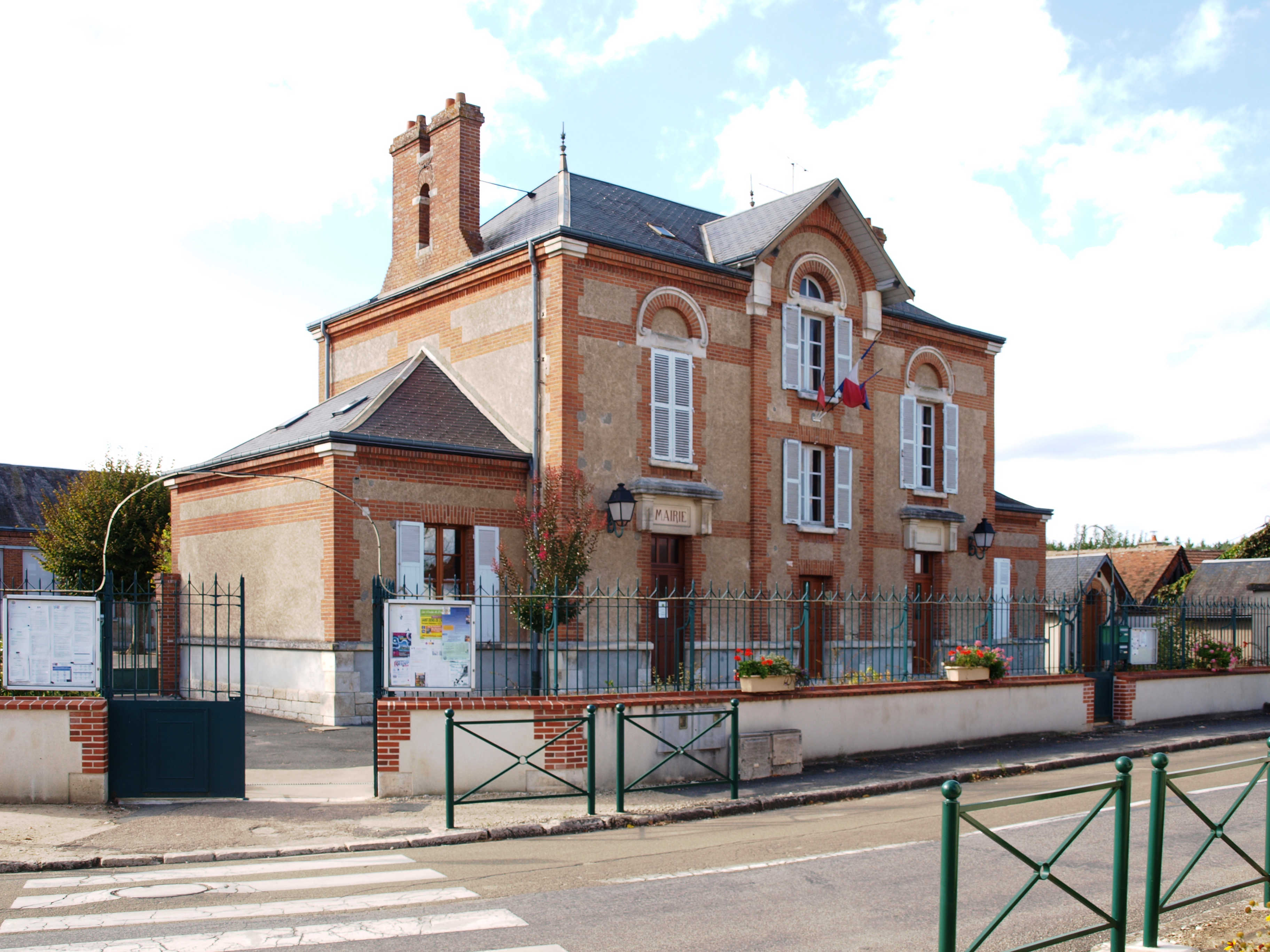
- The town hall in Sury-aux-Bois

- Coat of arms
- Location of Sury-aux-Bois
- Location within France Location within Centre-Val de Loire
- Coordinates: 47°58′00″N 2°20′33″E
- Country: France
- Region: Centre-Val de Loire
- Department: Loiret
- Arrondissement: Orléans
- Canton: Châteauneuf-sur-Loire
- Intercommunality: CC des Loges

Government
  - Mayor (2020–2026): Françoise Hébert
- Area^{1}: 38 km^{2} (15 sq mi)
- Highest elevation: 160 m (520 ft)
- Lowest elevation: 109 m (358 ft)
- Population (2023): 767
  - Density: 20/km^{2} (52/sq mi)
- Demonym: Suryens
- Time zone: UTC+01:00 (CET)
  - Summer (DST): UTC+02:00 (CEST)
- INSEE/Postal code: 45316 /45530
- ^{1} French Land Register data, which excludes lakes, ponds, glaciers > 1 km^{2} (0.386 sq mi or 247 acres) and river estuaries.

Sury-aux-Bois (French pronunciation: [syʁi o bwa]) is a commune in the Loiret department in north-central France.

== See also ==
- Communes of the Loiret department
