= Crouy-en-Thelle =

- Commune
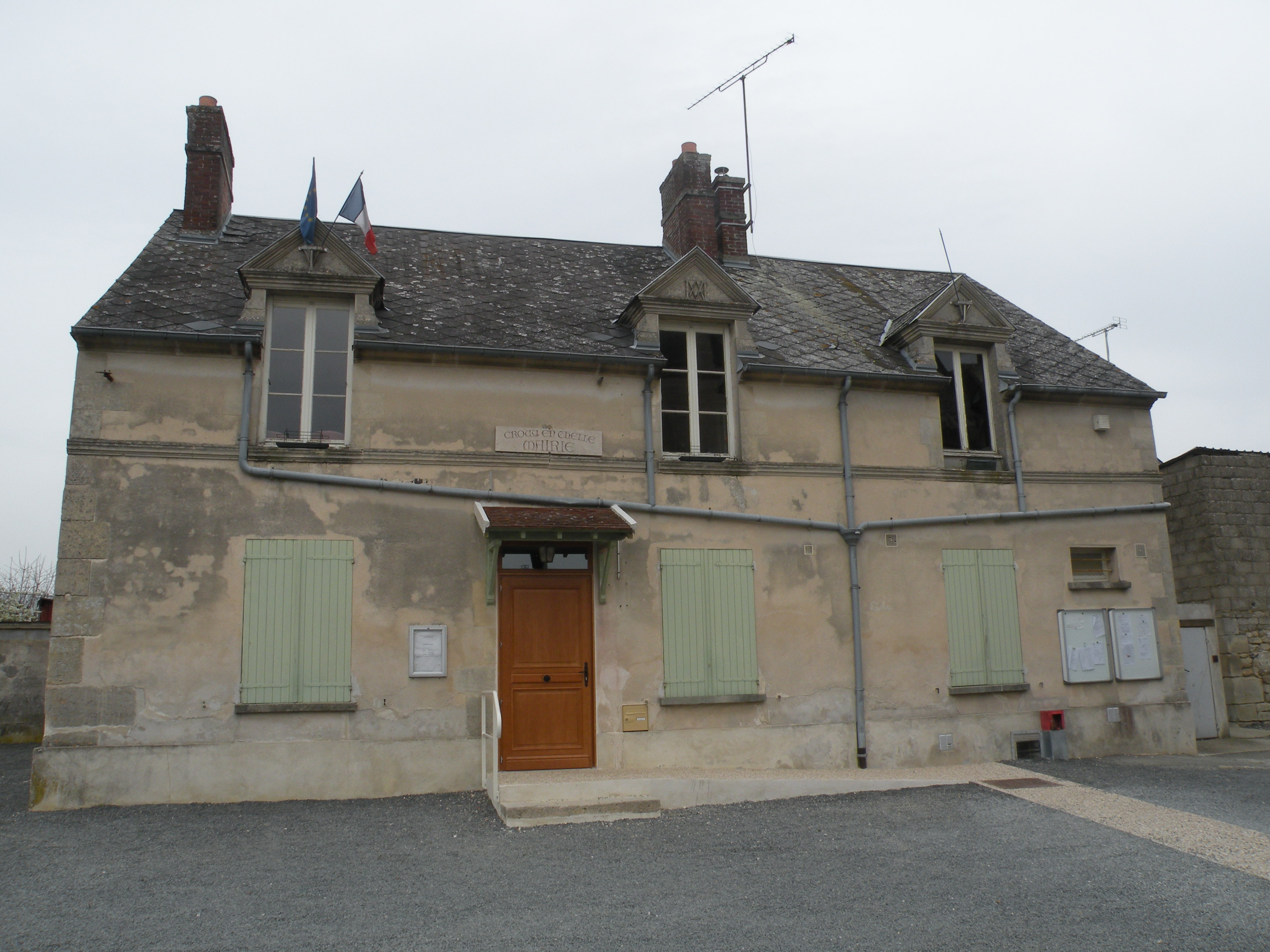
- The town hall in Crouy-en-Thelle

- Coat of arms
- Location of Crouy-en-Thelle
- Location within France Location within Hauts-de-France
- Coordinates: 49°12′57″N 2°19′23″E
- Country: France
- Region: Hauts-de-France
- Department: Oise
- Arrondissement: Senlis
- Canton: Chantilly
- Intercommunality: CC Thelloise

Government
  - Mayor (2021–2026): Yannick Van-Pee
- Area^{1}: 5.87 km^{2} (2.27 sq mi)
- Elevation: 120 m (390 ft)
- Highest elevation: 137 m (449 ft)
- Lowest elevation: 64 m (210 ft)
- Population (2023): 1,092
  - Density: 186/km^{2} (482/sq mi)
- Time zone: UTC+01:00 (CET)
  - Summer (DST): UTC+02:00 (CEST)
- INSEE/Postal code: 60185 /60530
- ^{1} French Land Register data, which excludes lakes, ponds, glaciers > 1 km^{2} (0.386 sq mi or 247 acres) and river estuaries.

Crouy-en-Thelle (French pronunciation: [kʁui ɑ̃ tɛl]) is a commune in the Oise department in northern France.

== Population ==
As of 2019, there are 415 dwellings in the commune, of which 399 primary residences.

Historical population
Year	Pop.	±% p.a.
1968	380	—
1975	353	−1.05%
1982	721	+10.74%
1990	869	+2.36%
1999	988	+1.44%
2007	998	+0.13%
2012	1,110	+2.15%
2017	1,098	−0.22%
2023	1,092	−0.09%
Source: INSEE

== Geography ==
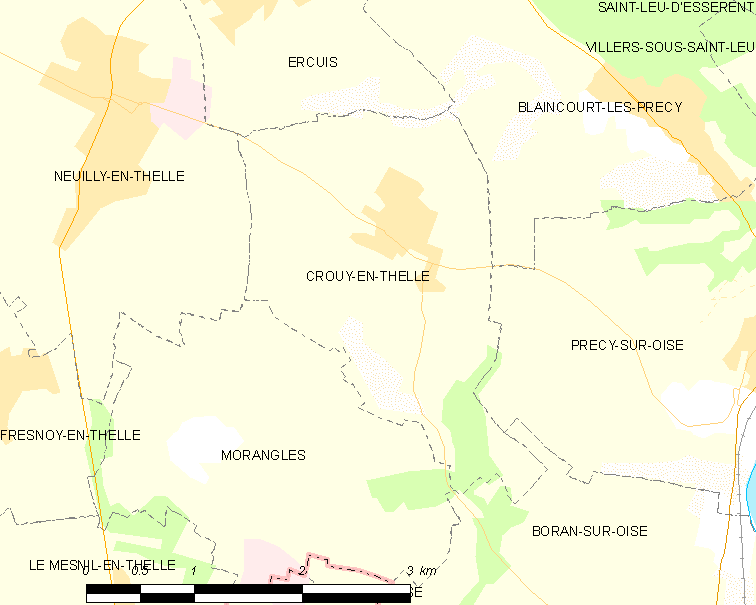
Map of the commune

Crouy-en-Thelle's elevation ranges between 64 m (210 ft) and 137 m (449 ft) above sea level. Its area is 5.87 km^{2} (2.27 sq mi). The town is 3 km east of Neuilly-en-Thelle, and 8 km northeast of Persan.

== See also ==
- Communes of the Oise department
