= Saint-Aignan-des-Gués =

- Part of Bray-Saint Aignan
- Coat of arms
- Location of Saint-Aignan-des-Gués
- Location within France Location within Centre-Val de Loire
- Coordinates: 47°50′33″N 2°19′16″E
- Country: France
- Region: Centre-Val de Loire
- Department: Loiret
- Arrondissement: Orléans
- Canton: Sully-sur-Loire
- Commune: Bray-Saint Aignan
- Area^{1}: 3.84 km^{2} (1.48 sq mi)
- Highest elevation: 130 m (430 ft)
- Lowest elevation: 108 m (354 ft)
- Population (2019): 293
  - Density: 76.3/km^{2} (198/sq mi)
- Time zone: UTC+01:00 (CET)
  - Summer (DST): UTC+02:00 (CEST)
- Postal code: 45460
- ^{1} French Land Register data, which excludes lakes, ponds, glaciers > 1 km^{2} (0.386 sq mi or 247 acres) and river estuaries.

Saint-Aignan-des-Gués (French pronunciation: [sɛ̃.t‿ɛɲɑ̃ de ɡe]) is a former commune in the Loiret department in north-central France. On 1 January 2017, it was merged into the new commune Bray-Saint Aignan. Its population was 293 in 2019.

== See also ==
- Communes of the Loiret department
