= Saint-Martin-d'Abbat =

- Commune
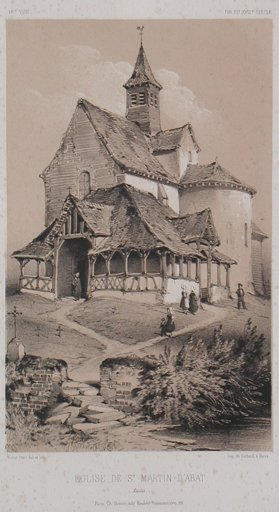
- The church in Saint-Martin-d'Abbat

- Coat of arms
- Location of Saint-Martin-d'Abbat
- Location within France Location within Centre-Val de Loire
- Coordinates: 47°51′27″N 2°16′10″E
- Country: France
- Region: Centre-Val de Loire
- Department: Loiret
- Arrondissement: Orléans
- Canton: Châteauneuf-sur-Loire
- Intercommunality: Les Loges

Government
  - Mayor (2020–2026): Joël Turpin
- Area^{1}: 38.97 km^{2} (15.05 sq mi)
- Highest elevation: 139 m (456 ft)
- Lowest elevation: 106 m (348 ft)
- Population (2023): 1,851
  - Density: 47.50/km^{2} (123.0/sq mi)
- Time zone: UTC+01:00 (CET)
  - Summer (DST): UTC+02:00 (CEST)
- INSEE/Postal code: 45290 /45110
- ^{1} French Land Register data, which excludes lakes, ponds, glaciers > 1 km^{2} (0.386 sq mi or 247 acres) and river estuaries.

Saint-Martin-d'Abbat (French pronunciation: [sɛ̃ maʁtɛ̃ d‿aba]) is a commune and town in the Loiret department in the administrative region of Centre-Val de Loire, France. It is located in the natural region of Loire Valley.

== See also ==
- Communes of the Loiret department
