= Escaro =

Escaro Escaró
- Commune
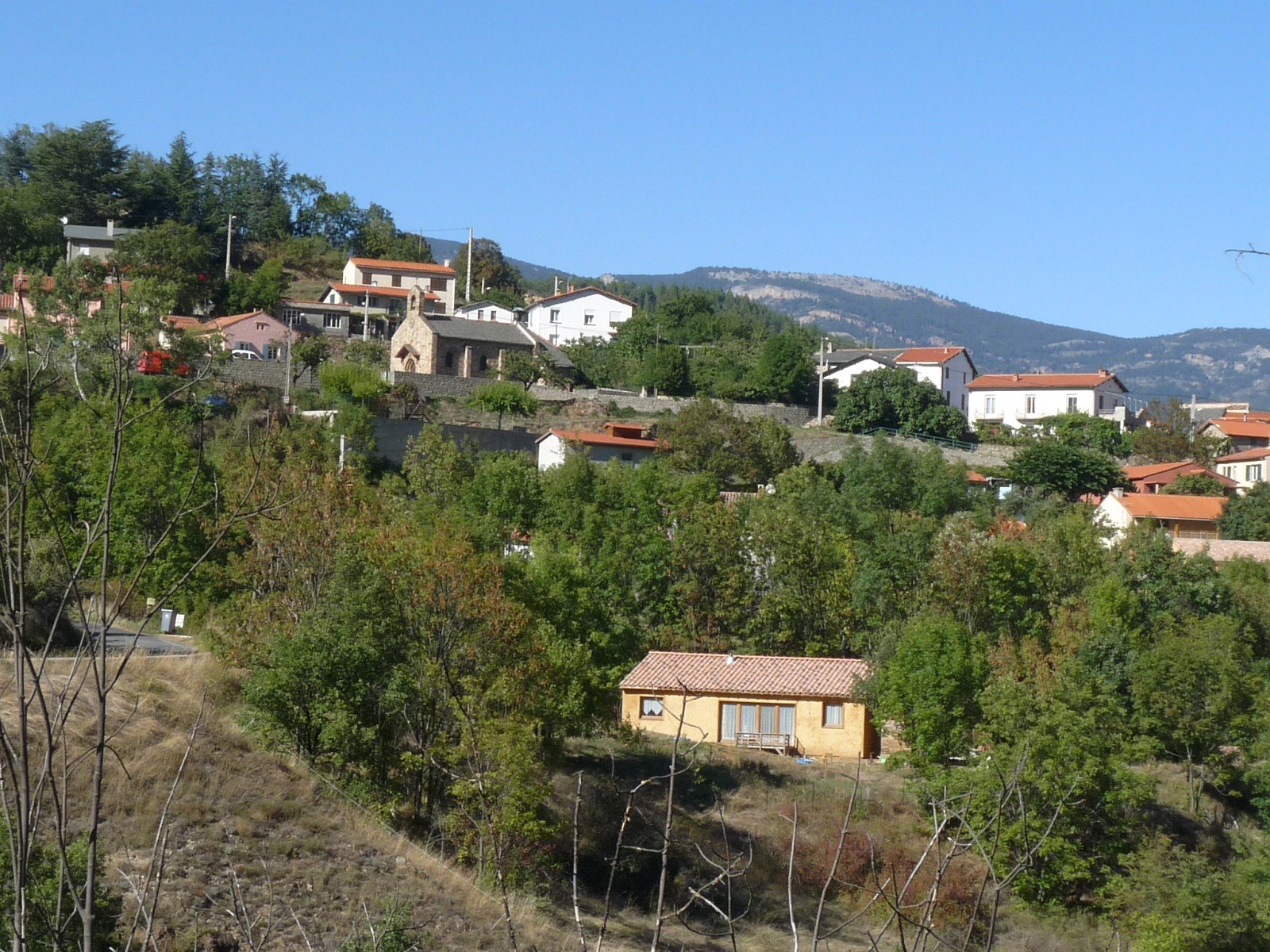
- A general view of Escaro
- Location of Escaro
- Location within France Location within Occitanie
- Coordinates: 42°32′19″N 2°18′57″E
- Country: France
- Region: Occitania
- Department: Pyrénées-Orientales
- Arrondissement: Prades
- Canton: Les Pyrénées catalanes
- Intercommunality: Conflent Canigó

Government
  - Mayor (2020–2026): Daniel Aspe
- Area^{1}: 15.21 km^{2} (5.87 sq mi)
- Elevation: 900 m (3,000 ft)
- Highest elevation: 2,082 m (6,831 ft)
- Lowest elevation: 588 m (1,929 ft)
- Population (2023): 128
  - Density: 8.42/km^{2} (21.8/sq mi)
- Time zone: UTC+01:00 (CET)
  - Summer (DST): UTC+02:00 (CEST)
- INSEE/Postal code: 66068 /66360
- ^{1} French Land Register data, which excludes lakes, ponds, glaciers > 1 km^{2} (0.386 sq mi or 247 acres) and river estuaries.

Escaro (French pronunciation: [ɛskaʁo]; Catalan: Escaró) is a commune in the Pyrénées-Orientales department in southern France.

== Geography ==
=== Localisation ===
Escaro is located in the canton of Les Pyrénées catalanes and in the arrondissement of Prades.

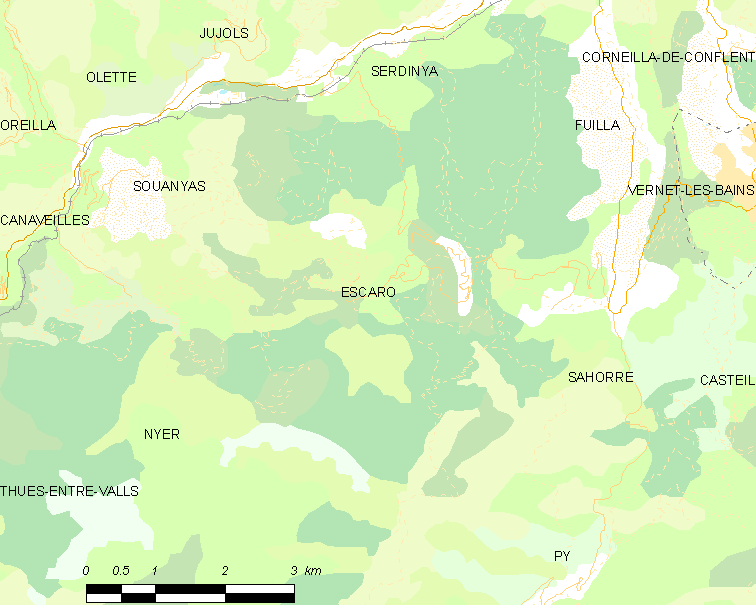
Map of Escaro and its surrounding communes

== History ==
On 20 March 1822, the commune of Aytua is linked to Escaro.

== Population ==
Historical population
Year	Pop.	±% p.a.
1968	164	—
1975	92	−7.93%
1982	85	−1.12%
1990	102	+2.31%
1999	84	−2.13%
2007	89	+0.73%
2012	120	+6.16%
2017	106	−2.45%
2023	128	+3.19%
Source: INSEE

== See also ==
- Communes of the Pyrénées-Orientales department
