= Orveau-Bellesauve =

- Part of Le Malesherbois
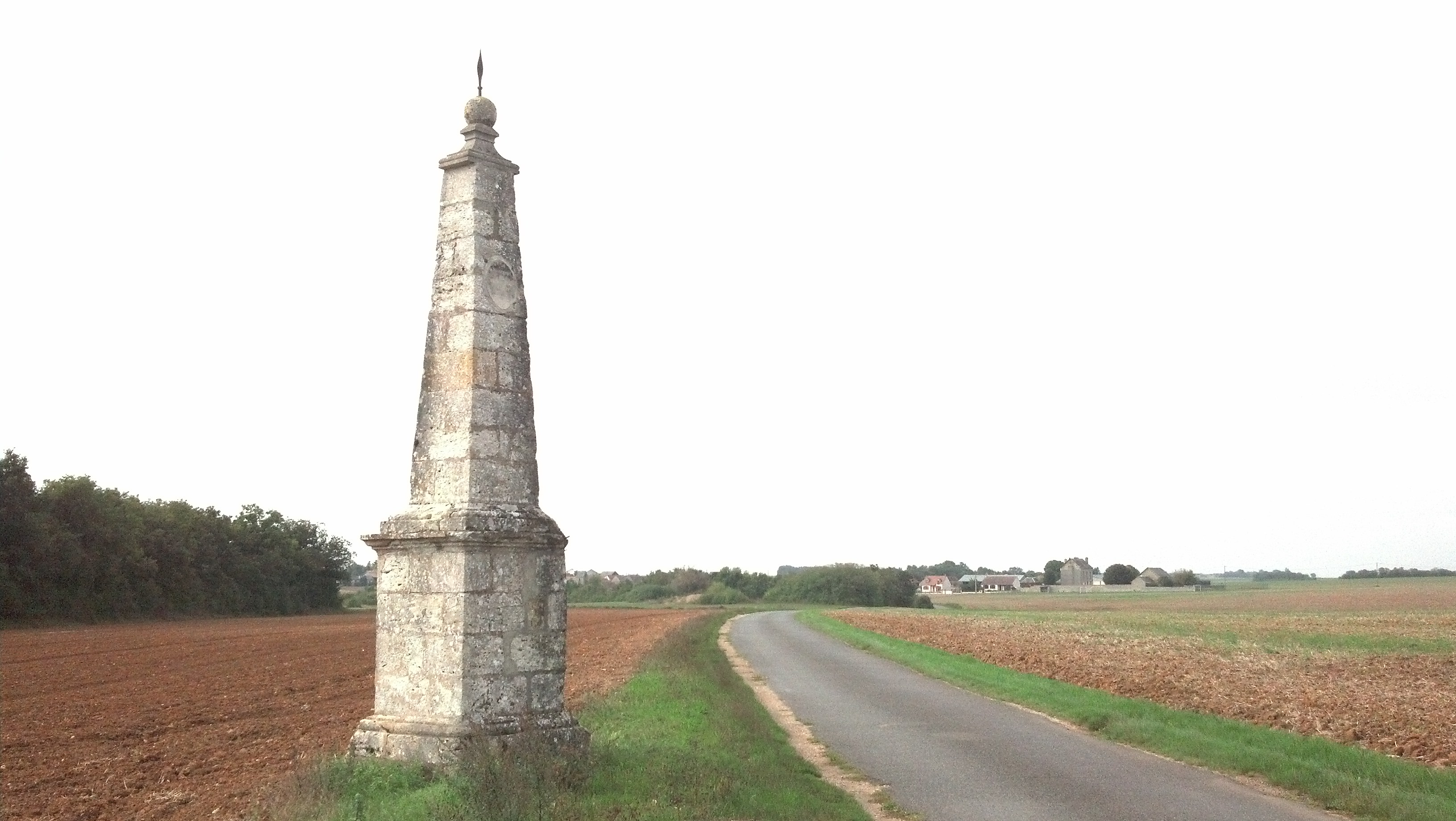
- The astronomical obelisk in Orveau-Bellesauve
- Location of Orveau-Bellesauve
- Location within France Location within Centre-Val de Loire
- Coordinates: 48°16′58″N 2°19′47″E
- Country: France
- Region: Centre-Val de Loire
- Department: Loiret
- Arrondissement: Pithiviers
- Canton: Le Malesherbois
- Commune: Le Malesherbois
- Area^{1}: 15.8 km^{2} (6.1 sq mi)
- Highest elevation: 139 m (456 ft)
- Lowest elevation: 103 m (338 ft)
- Population (2022): 413
  - Density: 26.1/km^{2} (67.7/sq mi)
- Time zone: UTC+01:00 (CET)
  - Summer (DST): UTC+02:00 (CEST)
- Postal code: 45330
- ^{1} French Land Register data, which excludes lakes, ponds, glaciers > 1 km^{2} (0.386 sq mi or 247 acres) and river estuaries.

Orveau-Bellesauve (French pronunciation: [ɔʁvo bɛlzov]) is a former commune in the Loiret department in north-central France. On 1 January 2016, it was merged into the new commune of Le Malesherbois.

== See also ==
- Communes of the Loiret department
