= Bray-en-Val =

- Part of Bray-Saint Aignan
- Location of Bray-en-Val
- Location within France Location within Centre-Val de Loire
- Coordinates: 47°49′50″N 2°22′03″E
- Country: France
- Region: Centre-Val de Loire
- Department: Loiret
- Arrondissement: Orléans
- Canton: Sully-sur-Loire
- Commune: Bray-Saint Aignan
- Area^{1}: 22.32 km^{2} (8.62 sq mi)
- Highest elevation: 147 m (482 ft)
- Lowest elevation: 107 m (351 ft)
- Population (2019): 1,448
  - Density: 64.87/km^{2} (168.0/sq mi)
- Time zone: UTC+01:00 (CET)
  - Summer (DST): UTC+02:00 (CEST)
- Postal code: 45460
- ^{1} French Land Register data, which excludes lakes, ponds, glaciers > 1 km^{2} (0.386 sq mi or 247 acres) and river estuaries.

Bray-en-Val (French pronunciation: [bʁɛ ɑ̃ val]) is a former commune in the Loiret department in north-central France. On 1 January 2017, it was merged into the new commune Bray-Saint Aignan.

== Population ==
Historical population

Year	Pop.	±% p.a.
1793	401	—
1821	444	+0.36%
1846	536	+0.76%
1872	668	+0.85%
1901	712	+0.22%
1926	622	−0.54%
1946	685	+0.48%
1962	668	−0.16%

Year	Pop.	±% p.a.
1968	702	+0.83%
1975	744	+0.83%
1982	837	+1.70%
1990	902	+0.94%
1999	1,043	+1.63%
2013	1,393	+2.09%
2019	1,448	+0.65%

Source: EHESS and INSEE

== See also ==
- Communes of the Loiret department
