= Bouzy-la-Forêt =

- Commune
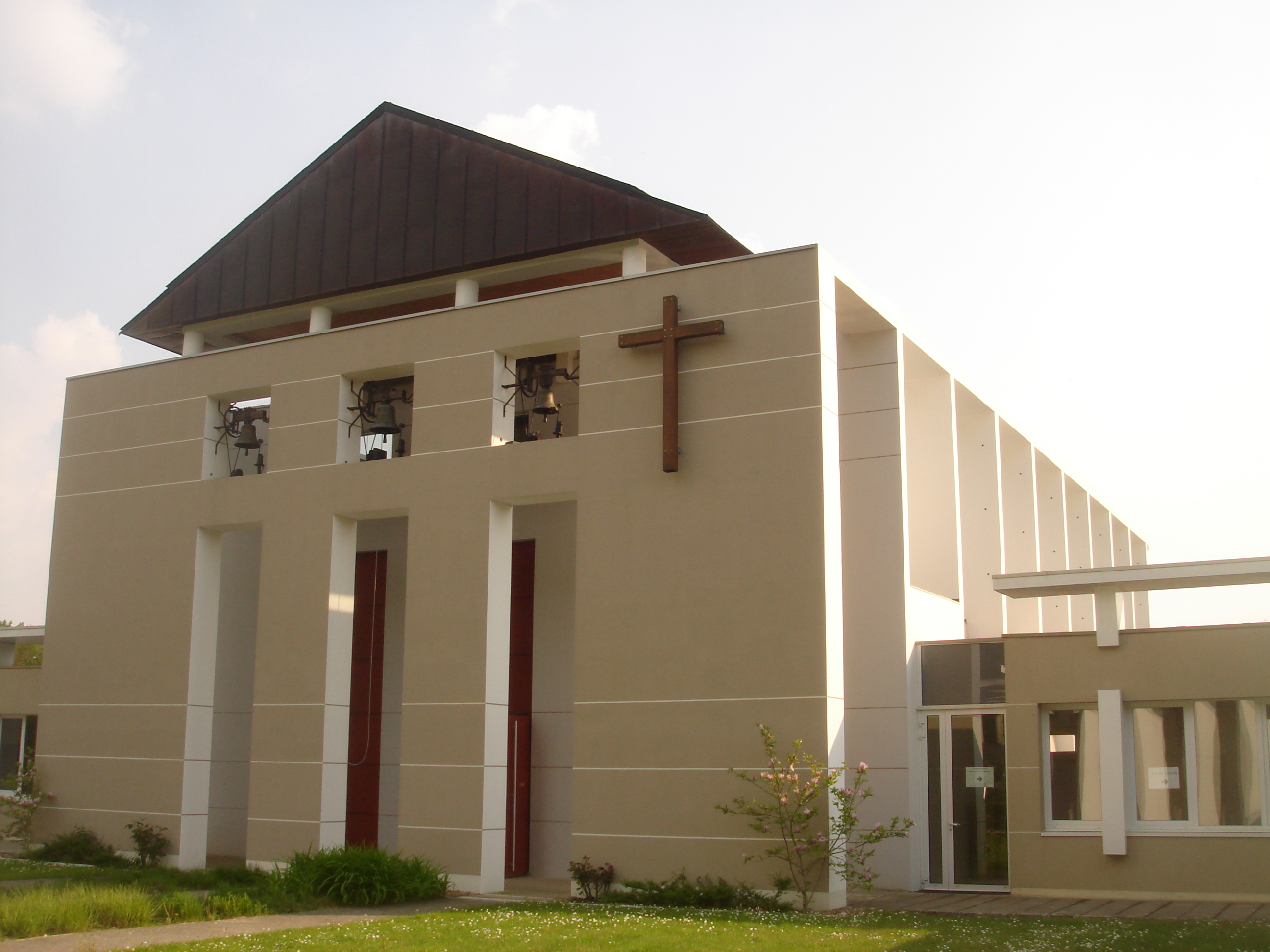
- The monastery in Bouzy-la-Forêt
- Location of Bouzy-la-Forêt
- Location within France Location within Centre-Val de Loire
- Coordinates: 47°51′08″N 2°22′46″E
- Country: France
- Region: Centre-Val de Loire
- Department: Loiret
- Arrondissement: Orléans
- Canton: Châteauneuf-sur-Loire
- Intercommunality: Loges

Government
  - Mayor (2020–2026): Florence Bonduel
- Area^{1}: 37.47 km^{2} (14.47 sq mi)
- Highest elevation: 142 m (466 ft)
- Lowest elevation: 113 m (371 ft)
- Population (2023): 1,218
  - Density: 32.51/km^{2} (84.19/sq mi)
- Time zone: UTC+01:00 (CET)
  - Summer (DST): UTC+02:00 (CEST)
- INSEE/Postal code: 45049 /45460
- ^{1} French Land Register data, which excludes lakes, ponds, glaciers > 1 km^{2} (0.386 sq mi or 247 acres) and river estuaries.

Bouzy-la-Forêt (French pronunciation: [buzi la fɔʁɛ]) is a commune in the Loiret département in north-central France.

== Population ==
Historical population
Year	Pop.	±% p.a.
1968	525	—
1975	541	+0.43%
1982	719	+4.15%
1990	766	+0.79%
1999	864	+1.35%
2007	1,147	+3.61%
2012	1,230	+1.41%
2017	1,221	−0.15%
2023	1,218	−0.04%
Source: INSEE

== See also ==
- Communes of the Loiret department
