= Manchecourt =

- Part of Le Malesherbois
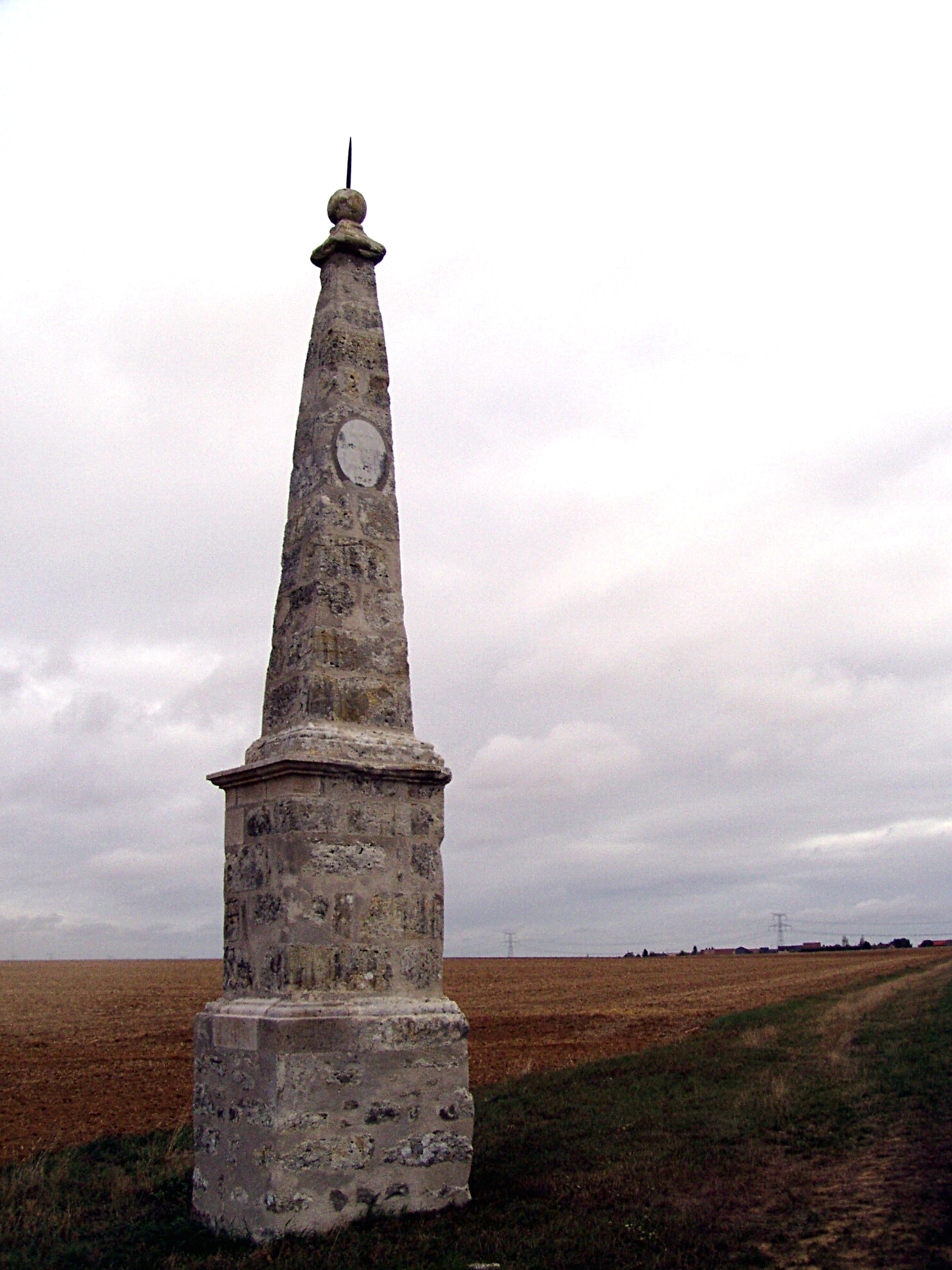
- A Paris meridian marker in Manchecourt
- Location of Manchecourt
- Location within France Location within Centre-Val de Loire
- Coordinates: 48°14′21″N 2°20′30″E
- Country: France
- Region: Centre-Val de Loire
- Department: Loiret
- Arrondissement: Pithiviers
- Canton: Le Malesherbois
- Commune: Le Malesherbois
- Area^{1}: 16.23 km^{2} (6.27 sq mi)
- Highest elevation: 138 m (453 ft)
- Lowest elevation: 107 m (351 ft)
- Population (2022): 750
  - Density: 46/km^{2} (120/sq mi)
- Time zone: UTC+01:00 (CET)
  - Summer (DST): UTC+02:00 (CEST)
- Postal code: 45300
- ^{1} French Land Register data, which excludes lakes, ponds, glaciers > 1 km^{2} (0.386 sq mi or 247 acres) and river estuaries.

Manchecourt (French pronunciation: [mɑ̃ʃkuʁ]) is a former commune in the Loiret department in north-central France. On 1 January 2016, it was merged into the new commune of Le Malesherbois.

== See also ==
- Communes of the Loiret department
