= Pennautier =

Commune in Occitanie, France

- Commune
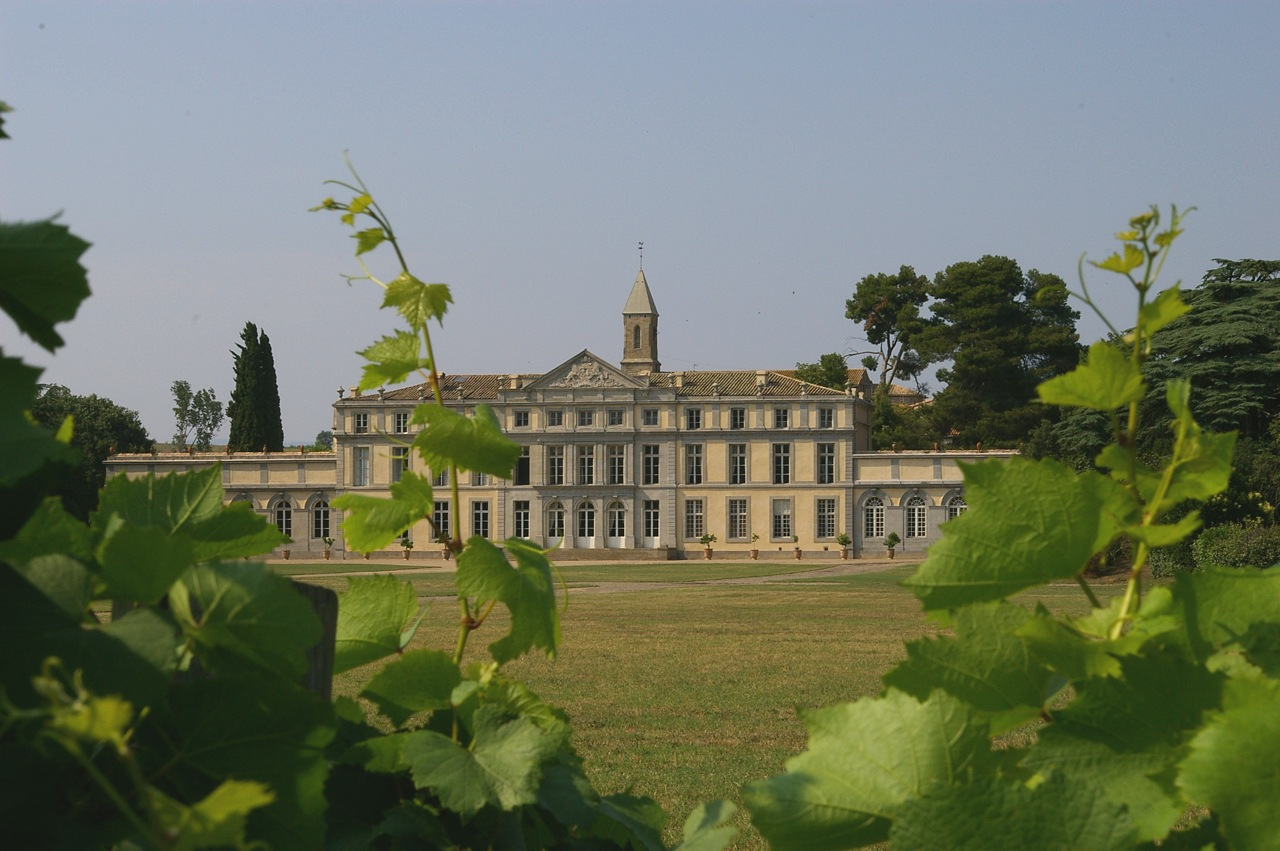
- Chateau

- Coat of arms
- Location of Pennautier
- Location within France Location within Occitanie
- Coordinates: 43°14′47″N 2°19′09″E
- Country: France
- Region: Occitania
- Department: Aude
- Arrondissement: Carcassonne
- Canton: La Vallée de l'Orbiel
- Intercommunality: Carcassonne Agglo

Government
  - Mayor (2020–2026): Jacques Dimon
- Area^{1}: 17.78 km^{2} (6.86 sq mi)
- Elevation: 104 m (341 ft)
- Highest elevation: 201 m (659 ft)
- Lowest elevation: 94 m (308 ft)
- Population (2023): 2,895
  - Density: 162.8/km^{2} (421.7/sq mi)
- Time zone: UTC+01:00 (CET)
  - Summer (DST): UTC+02:00 (CEST)
- INSEE/Postal code: 11279 /11610
- ^{1} French Land Register data, which excludes lakes, ponds, glaciers > 1 km^{2} (0.386 sq mi or 247 acres) and river estuaries.

Pennautier (French pronunciation: [pɛnotje]; Occitan: Puègnautièr) is a commune in the Aude department in southern France.

== Population ==
The inhabitants of the commune are known as Pennautierois in French.

Historical population

| Year | Pop. | ±% p.a. |
|---|---|---|
| 1793 | 1,214 | — |
| 1800 | 1,230 | +0.19% |
| 1806 | 1,229 | −0.01% |
| 1821 | 1,198 | −0.17% |
| 1831 | 1,214 | +0.13% |
| 1836 | 1,292 | +1.25% |
| 1841 | 1,262 | −0.47% |
| 1846 | 1,263 | +0.02% |
| 1851 | 1,215 | −0.77% |
| 1856 | 1,165 | −0.84% |
| 1861 | 1,135 | −0.52% |
| 1866 | 1,190 | +0.95% |
| 1872 | 1,148 | −0.60% |
| 1876 | 1,160 | +0.26% |
| 1881 | 1,194 | +0.58% |
| 1886 | 1,167 | −0.46% |
| 1891 | 1,124 | −0.75% |
| 1896 | 1,084 | −0.72% |
| 1901 | 1,104 | +0.37% |

| Year | Pop. | ±% p.a. |
|---|---|---|
| 1906 | 1,070 | −0.62% |
| 1911 | 1,040 | −0.57% |
| 1921 | 1,016 | −0.23% |
| 1926 | 1,004 | −0.24% |
| 1931 | 1,053 | +0.96% |
| 1936 | 1,104 | +0.95% |
| 1946 | 1,014 | −0.85% |
| 1954 | 1,006 | −0.10% |
| 1962 | 1,076 | +0.84% |
| 1968 | 1,245 | +2.46% |
| 1975 | 1,275 | +0.34% |
| 1982 | 1,375 | +1.08% |
| 1990 | 1,936 | +4.37% |
| 1999 | 2,253 | +1.70% |
| 2007 | 2,443 | +1.02% |
| 2012 | 2,454 | +0.09% |
| 2017 | 2,554 | +0.80% |
| 2023 | 2,895 | +2.11% |

Source: EHESS and INSEE (1968-2023)

== Sights ==
- Épanchoir de Foucaud
- Canal du Midi

== See also ==
- Communes of the Aude department
