= Coudray, Loiret =

Coudray
- Part of Le Malesherbois
- Location of Coudray
- Location within France Location within Centre-Val de Loire
- Coordinates: 48°16′22″N 2°22′09″E
- Country: France
- Region: Centre-Val de Loire
- Department: Loiret
- Arrondissement: Pithiviers
- Canton: Le Malesherbois
- Commune: Le Malesherbois
- Area^{1}: 12.42 km^{2} (4.80 sq mi)
- Highest elevation: 141 m (463 ft)
- Lowest elevation: 94 m (308 ft)
- Population (2022): 386
  - Density: 31.1/km^{2} (80.5/sq mi)
- Demonym: Coudrillons
- Time zone: UTC+01:00 (CET)
  - Summer (DST): UTC+02:00 (CEST)
- Postal code: 45330
- ^{1} French Land Register data, which excludes lakes, ponds, glaciers > 1 km^{2} (0.386 sq mi or 247 acres) and river estuaries.

Coudray (French pronunciation: [kudʁɛ]) is a former commune in the Loiret department in north-central France. On 1 January 2016, it was merged into the new commune of Le Malesherbois.

== See also ==
- Communes of the Loiret department
