= Fournes =

Fournes or Fournès is the name or part of the name of several communes in France:

- Fournès, in the Gard département
- Fournes-Cabardès, in the Aude département
- Fournes-en-Weppes, in the Nord département
