= Lastours =

Commune in Occitania, France

- Commune
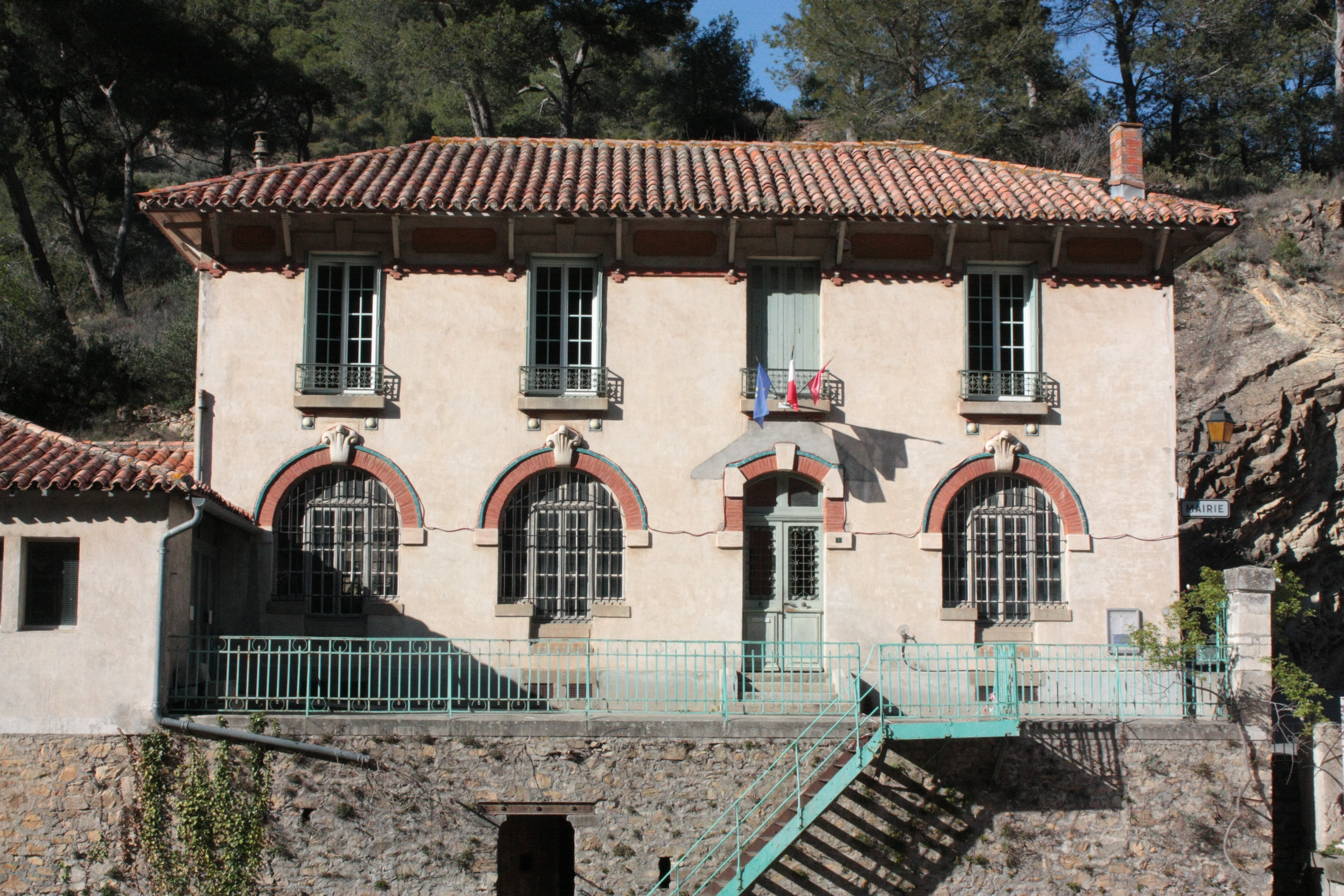
- The town hall in Lastours

- Coat of arms
- Location of Lastours
- Location within France Location within Occitanie
- Coordinates: 43°20′06″N 2°22′47″E
- Country: France
- Region: Occitania
- Department: Aude
- Arrondissement: Carcassonne
- Canton: La Vallée de l'Orbiel

Government
  - Mayor (2020–2026): Max Brail
- Area^{1}: 2.80 km^{2} (1.08 sq mi)
- Elevation: 180 m (590 ft)
- Highest elevation: 383 m (1,257 ft)
- Lowest elevation: 163 m (535 ft)
- Population (2023): 144
  - Density: 51.4/km^{2} (133/sq mi)
- Time zone: UTC+01:00 (CET)
  - Summer (DST): UTC+02:00 (CEST)
- INSEE/Postal code: 11194 /11600
- ^{1} French Land Register data, which excludes lakes, ponds, glaciers > 1 km^{2} (0.386 sq mi or 247 acres) and river estuaries.

Lastours (Occitan: Las Tors) is a commune in the Aude department in southern France.

Lastours is located 12 km (7.5 mi) outside Carcassonne, in the valley of the Orbiel. There are four small castles each built on a large 300 m high rocky ridge. The castles were built to control the access to the Montagne Noire and the Cabardes region. These are some of the few original Cathar castles left.

== History ==
Traces of human occupation date back to prehistory in a cave called the Trou de la ville at the foot of the Lastours castles. The history of the village is linked to the different occupations of the castles of Lastours.

- Lastours has a very large Cathar site with its Châteaux de Lastours composed of four towers, hence the origin of its name.

The development of metallurgy has been known in Lastours since Antiquity. Indeed, the region is rich in iron, copper, lead and gold and is an important center of mining extraction. The village is surrounded by mining deposits:

- The Barrencs of Fournes, exploited by the Romans for copper and silver-bearing lead.
- Les Caunettes, exploited in the 16th and 17th century for iron and silver.
- Salsigne-Villanière was exploited for gold from the middle of the 19th century.

The village was only served by a road from 1863. In the 19th century, the cloth industry flourished in Lastours.

== Population ==
Historical population
Year	Pop.	±% p.a.
1968	444	—
1975	300	−5.45%
1982	248	−2.68%
1990	159	−5.41%
1999	163	+0.28%
2007	165	+0.15%
2012	166	+0.12%
2017	159	−0.86%
2023	144	−1.64%
Source: INSEE

== See also ==
- Communes of the Aude department
