= Jacques Laurent Gilly =

French general (1769–1829)

Count of the Empire Jacques Laurent Gilly
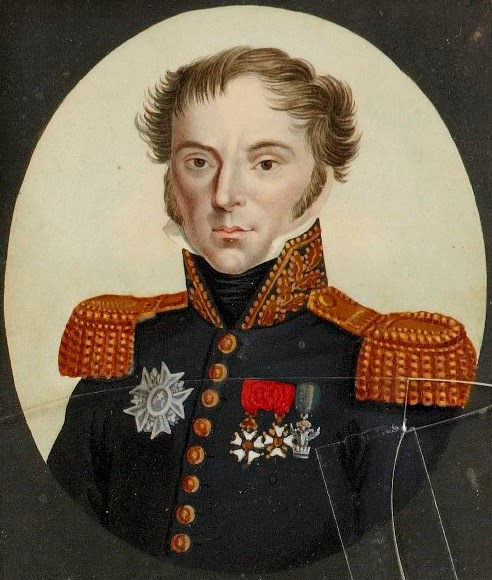
- Portrait by unknown artist
- Born: 12 August 1769 Fournès, France
- Died: 5 August 1829 (aged 59) Aramon, France
- Cause of death: Illness
- Allegiance: First French Republic; First French Empire
- Awards: Legion of Honor; Order of Saint Louis

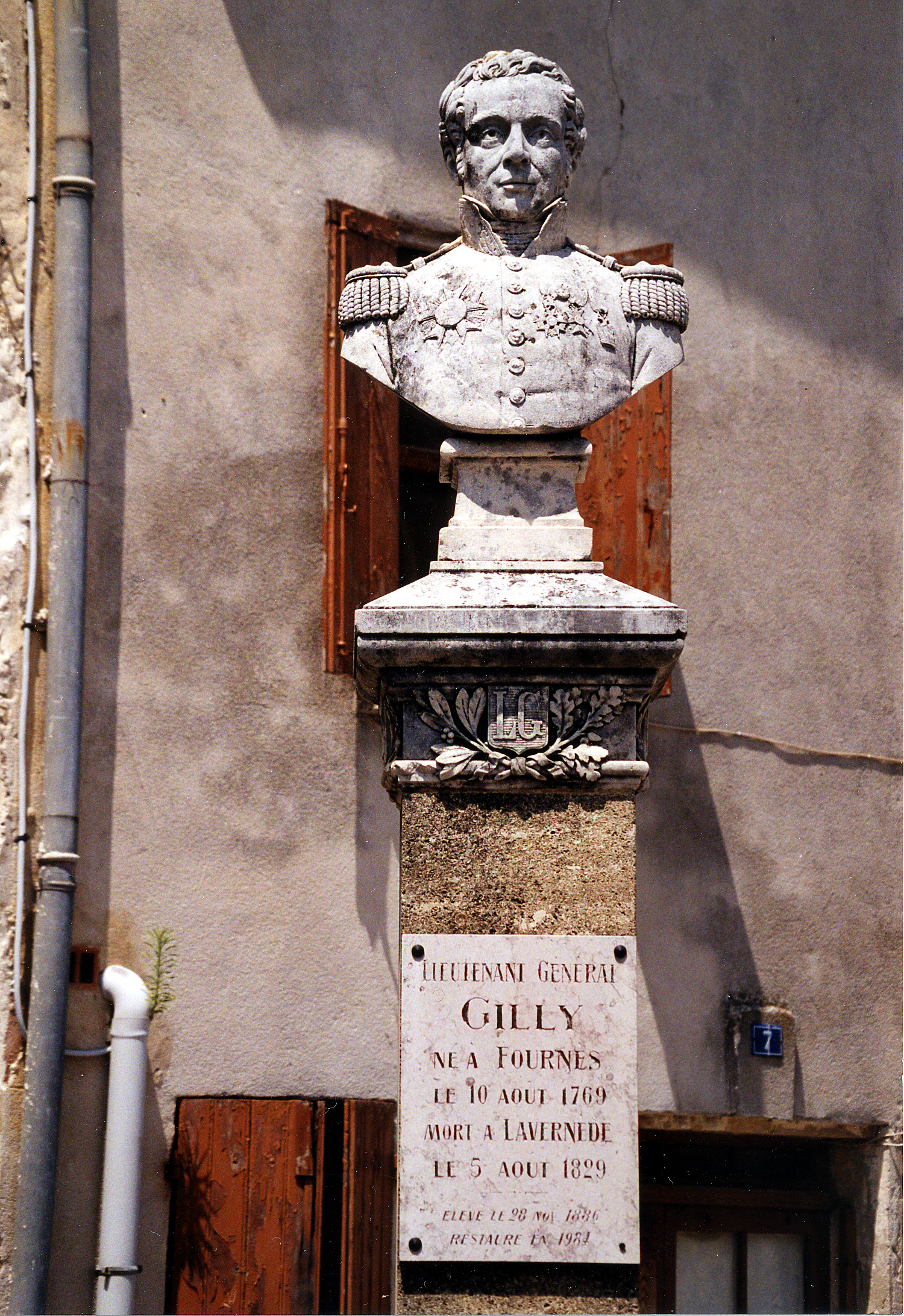
Statue in Fournès

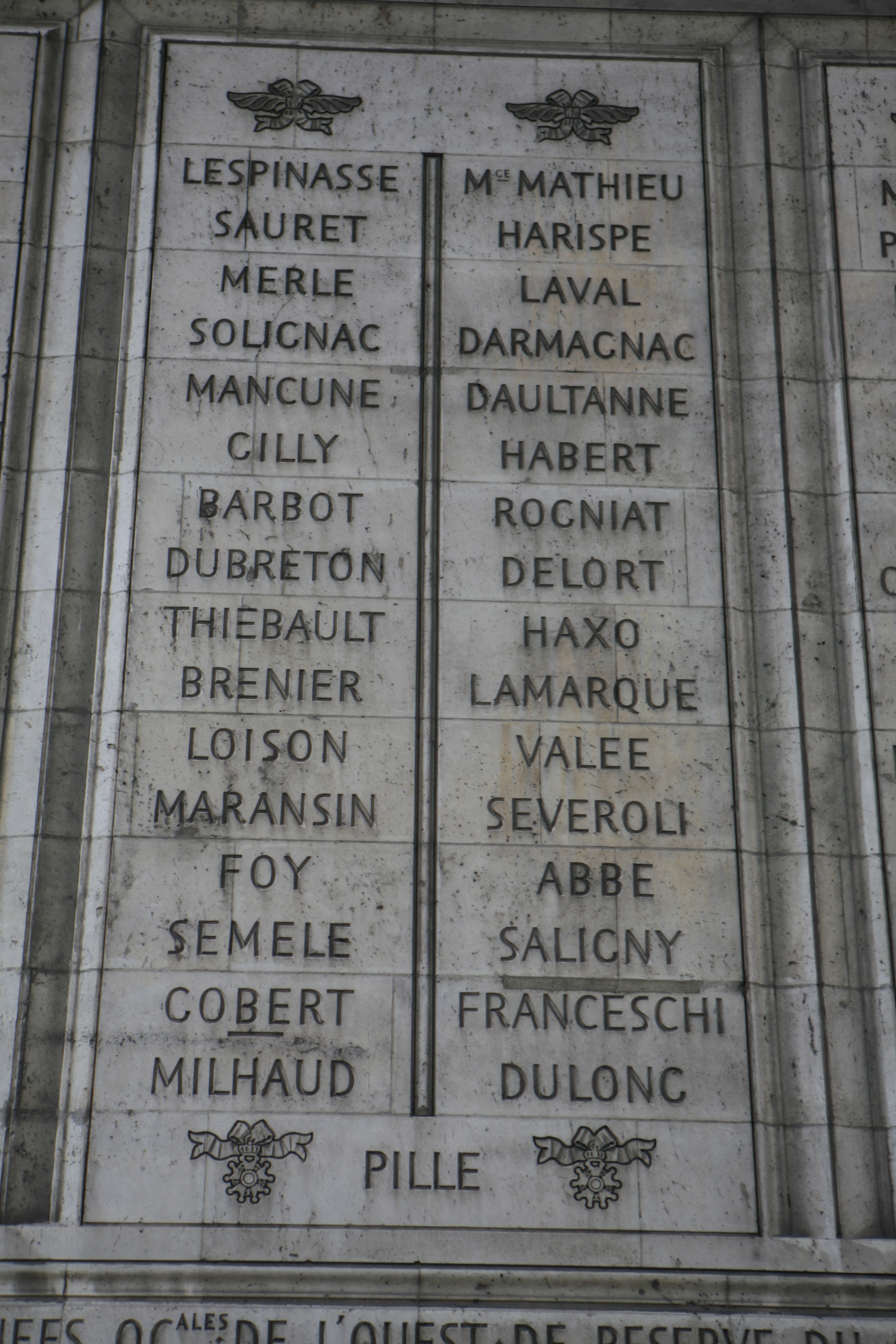
Gilly's name on the Arc de Triomphe among others

Jacques Laurent Gilly (pronounced [ʒɑk lɔʁɑ̃ ʒiˈli]; 12 August 1769 – 5 August 1829) was a French brigadier and divisional general during the French Revolutionary and Napoleonic Wars. Throughout his military career, he fought in numerous armies and was given the titles of Baron of the Empire, Count of the Empire, Knight of Saint Louis, and Grand Officer of the Legion of Honour.

== Military career ==
Gilly joined the French Revolutionary Army in August 1792, and the following month he was promoted to lieutenant colonel of his battalion. From then, he served in the Army of the Alps and later the Army of Italy in brevity. He was promoted to chef de brigade in September of 1793 for the numerous military engagements he fought in while serving in the Army of the Eastern Pyrenees he had recently joined.

In July of 1795, he was captured and wounded while defending a castle in Spain; he was released a few months later after France and Spain signed a peace deal. In the period of 1796 to 1800, he fought under Pierre Dominique Garnier, Jean Joseph Guieu, Jean Thomas Guillaume Lorge, and Bon-Adrien Jeannot de Moncey at different times. During this period, he served in the Army of Italy once more, along with the armies of Rome and the Danube. It was on 30 July 1799 when he was promoted to brigadier general. He also served in the Army of the Grisons.

In 1805, he commanded a brigade under Jean-Mathieu Seras. In 1806, he fought in Dalmatia, and the next year, he served under Louis Friant. In 1809, he was rewarded with the title of Baron of the Empire and served in the Army of Germany. The same year, he was injured by a bullet at the Battle of Wagram and promoted to divisional general. In 1810, he became the commander of Zeeland, where he would live for several years, and the next year he became a Grand Officer of the Legion of Honour. In 1814, he took control of Bruges and served under Nicolas Joseph Maison while defending the Low Countries.

Gilly was granted the status of commander of Gard and made a Knight of Saint Louis by the Bourbons following Napoleon's exile; he would still fight for Napoleon during the War of the Seventh Coalition, who, on 29 April 1815, gave him the title of Count of the Empire.

After being informed in late June of 1815 about Napoleon's defeat at the Battle of Waterloo, Gilly, then stationed in the Midi region, initially defeated a group of Catholic royalists in the towns of Alès and Uzès; he was later forced into hiding in the predominantly Protestant Cévennes by the presence of the Bourbons. His uncaptured presence in the Cévennes spread fear amongst Catholics, evoking memories of the violent Camisard Revolt. He was a Protestant and Bonapartist during this period known as the Second White Terror, making him particularly vulnerable to persecution.

Following Napoleon's exile to Saint Helena, he fled to the United States of America after the Bourbons forced him out of France. Following a trial in absentia, he was sentenced to death in 1816 but returned to France four years later after being pardoned. He retired from the military in 1824 or 1825 and lived in the Château de la Vernède in Aramon, France until his death in 1829.

== Personal life ==
Gilly was born on August 12 of 1769, in Fournès, France. Shortly after his release from prison in Spain, Gilly married a woman named Thérèse and the two would go on to have four children. He died of sickness on 5 August 1829 in Aramon, France and is buried in a cemetery in Remoulins. Gilly was of the Protestant denomination of Christianity.

== Legacy ==
Gilly's name is inscribed on the west pillar of the Arc de Triomphe as follows: "Jacques Laurent Gilly, général de division de l’infanterie." On June 12, 2021, a day of remembering was held to honor General Gilly. His tomb was renovated, and a commemorative plaque for him can be found on his family home.

== See also ==
- List of French generals of the Revolutionary and Napoleonic Wars
