= Pradelles =

Pradelle or Pradelles is the name or part of the name of the following communes in France:

- Pradelle, Drôme, in the Drôme department
- Pradelles, Haute-Loire, in the Haute-Loire department
- Pradelles, Nord, in the Nord department
- Pradelles-Cabardès, in the Aude department
- Pradelles-en-Val, in the Aude department
