= Ventenac-Cabardès =

Commune in Occitanie, France

- Commune
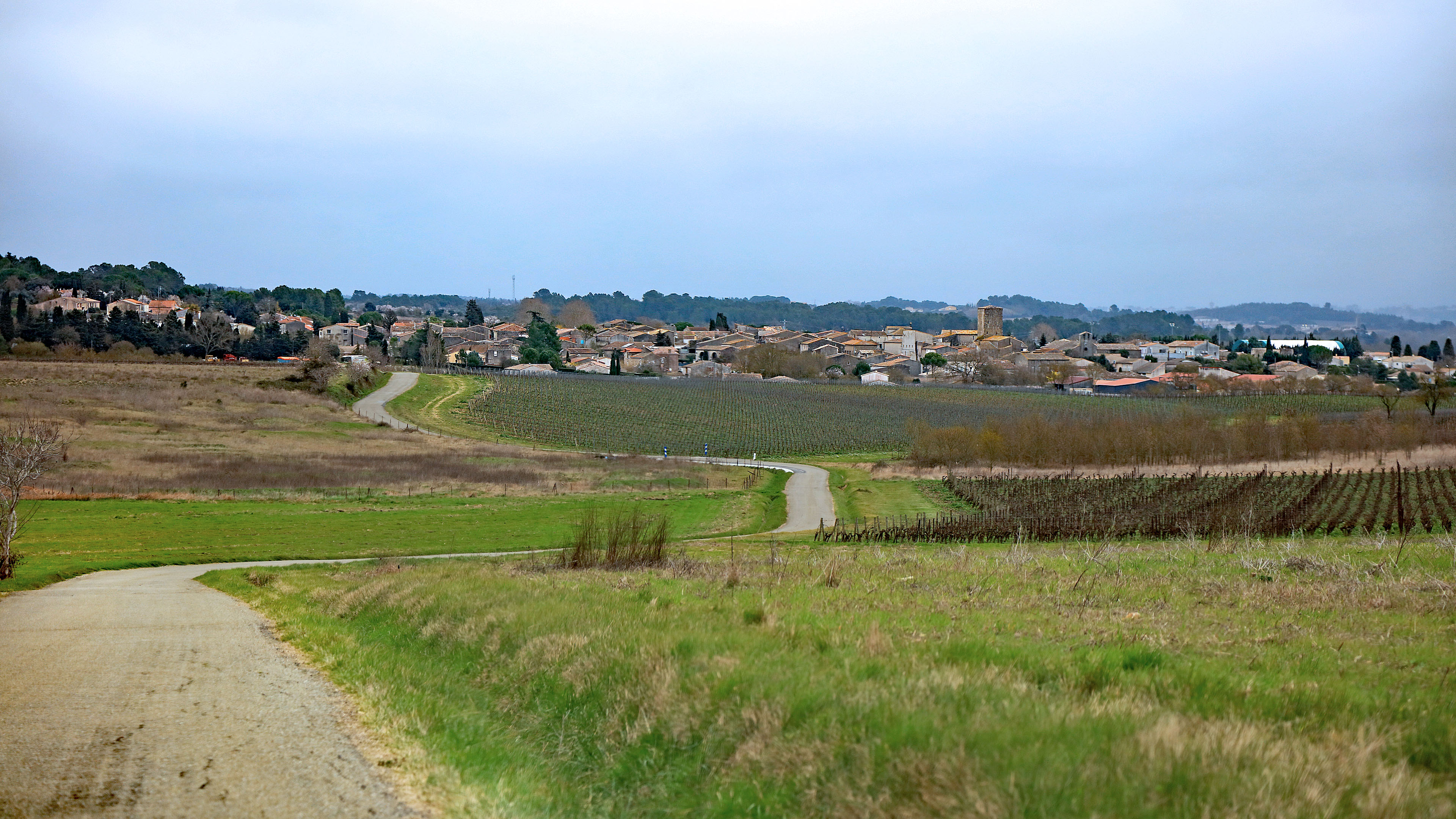
- A general view of Ventenac-Cabardès

- Coat of arms
- Location of Ventenac-Cabardès
- Location within France Location within Occitanie
- Coordinates: 43°16′04″N 2°17′07″E
- Country: France
- Region: Occitania
- Department: Aude
- Arrondissement: Carcassonne
- Canton: La Vallée de l'Orbiel
- Intercommunality: Carcassonne Agglo

Government
  - Mayor (2026–32): Richard Tena
- Area^{1}: 10.36 km^{2} (4.00 sq mi)
- Elevation: 105 m (344 ft)
- Highest elevation: 285 m (935 ft)
- Lowest elevation: 102 m (335 ft)
- Population (2023): 962
  - Density: 92.9/km^{2} (240/sq mi)
- Time zone: UTC+01:00 (CET)
  - Summer (DST): UTC+02:00 (CEST)
- INSEE/Postal code: 11404 /11610
- ^{1} French Land Register data, which excludes lakes, ponds, glaciers > 1 km^{2} (0.386 sq mi or 247 acres) and river estuaries.

Ventenac-Cabardès (French pronunciation: [vɛ̃tnak kabaʁdɛs]; Occitan: Ventenac de Cabardés) is a commune in the Aude department in southern France.

== Population ==
Historical population
Year	Pop.	±% p.a.
1968	421	—
1975	392	−1.01%
1982	562	+5.28%
1990	652	+1.87%
1999	759	+1.70%
2007	867	+1.68%
2012	854	−0.30%
2017	959	+2.35%
2023	962	+0.05%
Source: INSEE

== See also ==
- Communes of the Aude department
