= Conques-sur-Orbiel =

Commune in Occitanie, France

- Commune
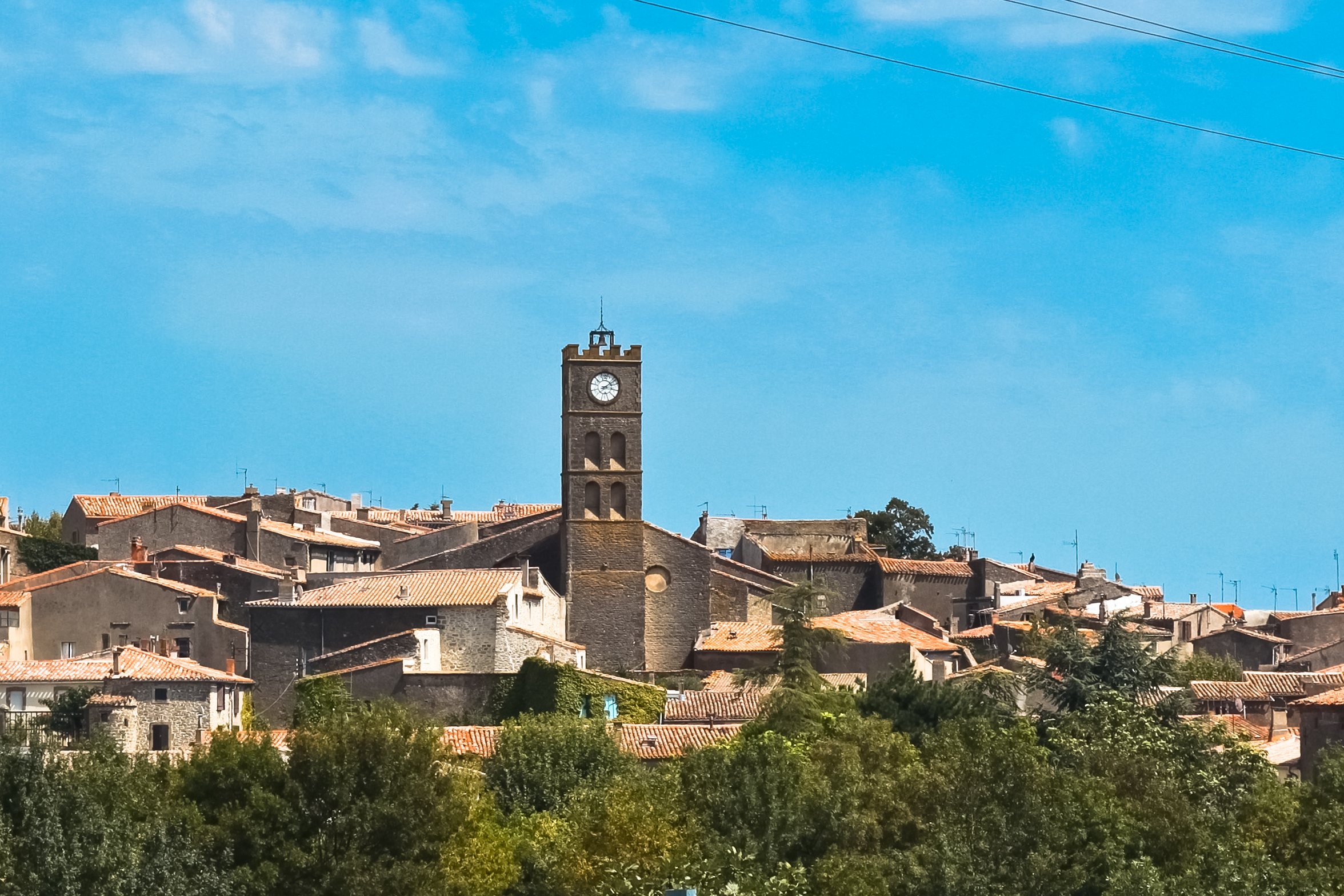
- The church and surroundings in Conques-sur-Orbiel

- Coat of arms
- Location of Conques-sur-Orbiel
- Location within France Location within Occitanie
- Coordinates: 43°16′14″N 2°24′09″E
- Country: France
- Region: Occitania
- Department: Aude
- Arrondissement: Carcassonne
- Canton: La Vallée de l'Orbiel
- Intercommunality: Carcassonne Agglo

Government
  - Mayor (2020–2026): Jean-François Juste
- Area^{1}: 25.07 km^{2} (9.68 sq mi)
- Elevation: 125 m (410 ft)
- Highest elevation: 286 m (938 ft)
- Lowest elevation: 101 m (331 ft)
- Population (2023): 2,523
  - Density: 100.6/km^{2} (260.7/sq mi)
- Time zone: UTC+01:00 (CET)
  - Summer (DST): UTC+02:00 (CEST)
- INSEE/Postal code: 11099 /11600
- Website: www.conques-sur-orbiel.fr
- ^{1} French Land Register data, which excludes lakes, ponds, glaciers > 1 km^{2} (0.386 sq mi or 247 acres) and river estuaries.

Conques-sur-Orbiel (French pronunciation: [kɔ̃k syʁ ɔʁbjɛl]; Occitan: Concas, before 1962: Conques) is a commune in the Aude department in southern France.

== Population ==
Historical population
Year	Pop.	±% p.a.
1968	1,662	—
1975	1,692	+0.26%
1982	1,786	+0.78%
1990	2,043	+1.69%
1999	2,061	+0.10%
2007	2,269	+1.21%
2012	2,435	+1.42%
2017	2,525	+0.73%
2023	2,523	−0.01%
Source: INSEE

== Chapel ==
About 2 km north of the town lies a chapel constructed in 1885 for property owner Camille Don de Cépian and designed by Gabriel Pasquier. The chapel is crumbling but was recently stabilized.

== 2018 Flood ==
In mid-October 2018, Villegailhenc, Conques-sur-Orbiel, and Villardonnel, and Trèbes, along with nearby areas along the river Aude, were devastated when the river flooded after intense rain. 12 people were killed, including a nun. Natural deposits of high arsenic content were disturbed & spread by these flood waters, levels of 100 ug/L have been subsequently measured in affected areas.

== See also ==
- Communes of the Aude department
- List of medieval bridges in France
