= Les Ilhes =

Commune in Occitanie, France

- Commune
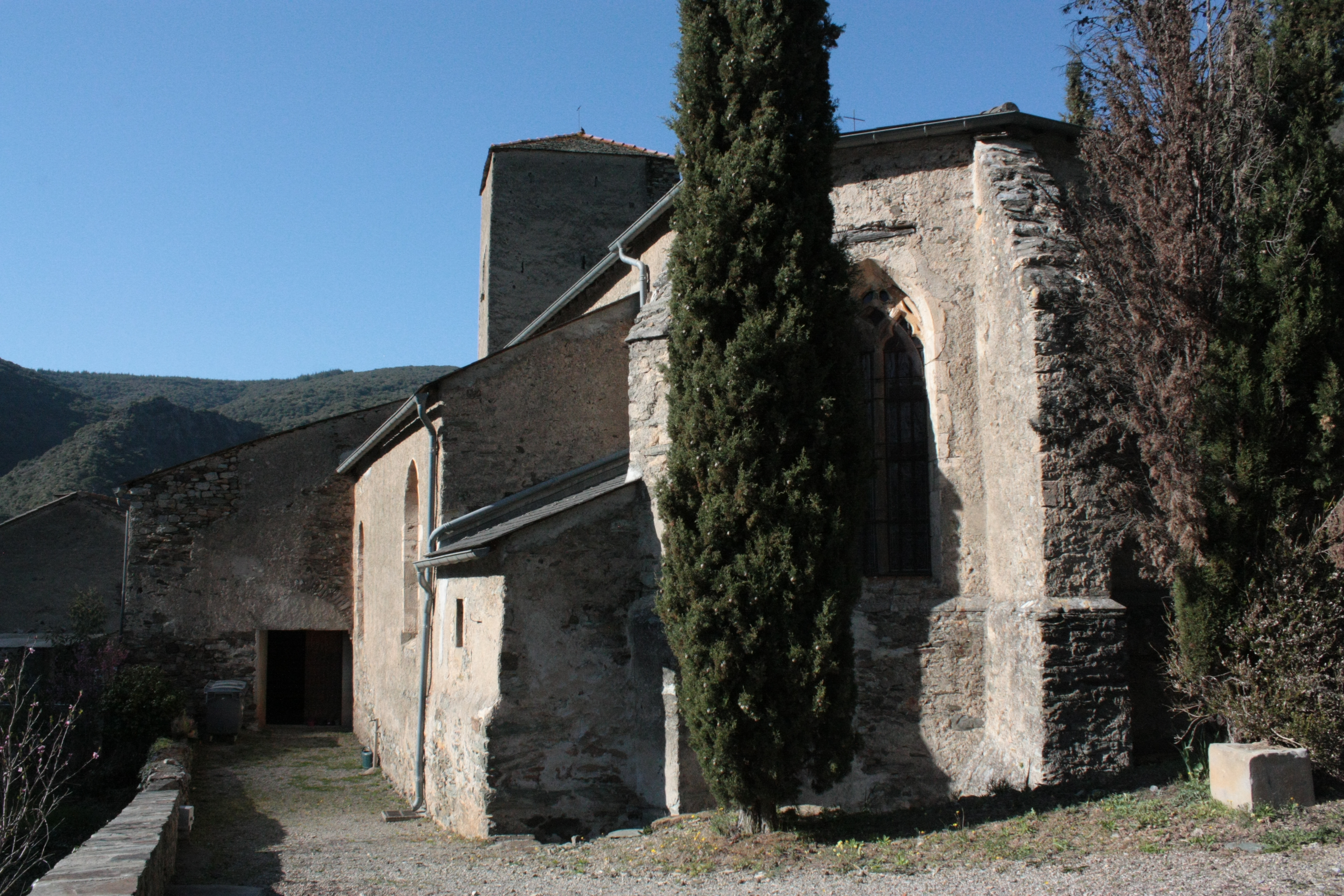
- The church in Les Ilhes

- Coat of arms
- Location of Les Ilhes
- Location within France Location within Occitanie
- Coordinates: 43°21′10″N 2°22′44″E
- Country: France
- Region: Occitania
- Department: Aude
- Arrondissement: Carcassonne
- Canton: La Vallée de l'Orbiel
- Intercommunality: Montagne Noire

Government
  - Mayor (2020–2026): Jacques Fargues
- Area^{1}: 4.16 km^{2} (1.61 sq mi)
- Elevation: 240 m (790 ft)
- Highest elevation: 573 m (1,880 ft)
- Lowest elevation: 220 m (720 ft)
- Population (2023): 64
  - Density: 15/km^{2} (40/sq mi)
- Time zone: UTC+01:00 (CET)
  - Summer (DST): UTC+02:00 (CEST)
- INSEE/Postal code: 11174 /11380
- ^{1} French Land Register data, which excludes lakes, ponds, glaciers > 1 km^{2} (0.386 sq mi or 247 acres) and river estuaries.

Les Ilhes (French pronunciation: [le.z‿ij]; Occitan: Las Ilhas) is a commune in the Aude department in southern France.

== Population ==
Historical population
Year	Pop.	±% p.a.
1968	148	—
1975	101	−5.31%
1982	90	−1.63%
1990	77	−1.93%
1999	58	−3.10%
2007	56	−0.44%
2012	48	−3.04%
2017	52	+1.61%
2023	64	+3.52%
Source: INSEE

== See also ==
- Communes of the Aude department
