= Caudebronde =

Commune in Occitanie, France

- Commune
- Coat of arms
- Location of Caudebronde
- Location within France Location within Occitanie
- Coordinates: 43°22′47″N 2°18′40″E
- Country: France
- Region: Occitania
- Department: Aude
- Arrondissement: Carcassonne
- Canton: La Vallée de l'Orbiel

Government
  - Mayor (2020–2026): Cyril Delpech
- Area^{1}: 6.22 km^{2} (2.40 sq mi)
- Elevation: 550 m (1,800 ft)
- Highest elevation: 806 m (2,644 ft)
- Lowest elevation: 510 m (1,670 ft)
- Population (2023): 221
  - Density: 35.5/km^{2} (92.0/sq mi)
- Time zone: UTC+01:00 (CET)
  - Summer (DST): UTC+02:00 (CEST)
- INSEE/Postal code: 11079 /11390
- ^{1} French Land Register data, which excludes lakes, ponds, glaciers > 1 km^{2} (0.386 sq mi or 247 acres) and river estuaries.

Caudebronde (French pronunciation: [kod.bʁɔ̃d]; Occitan: Caudabronda) is a commune in the Aude department in southern France.

== Population ==
Historical population
Year	Pop.	±% p.a.
1968	195	—
1975	180	−1.14%
1982	154	−2.20%
1990	151	−0.25%
1999	150	−0.07%
2007	158	+0.65%
2012	192	+3.97%
2017	189	−0.31%
2023	221	+2.64%
Source: INSEE

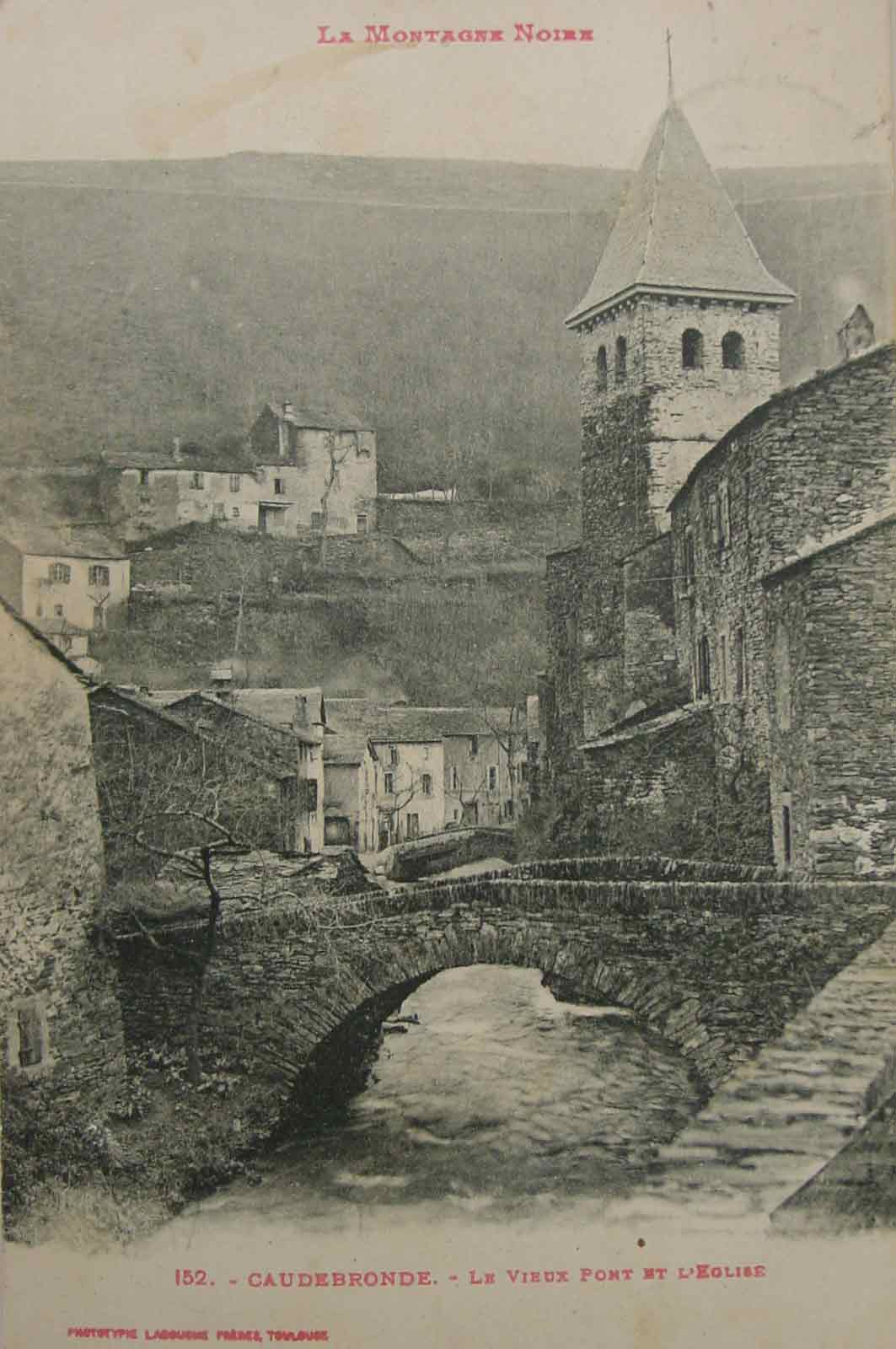
Caudebronde

== See also ==
- Communes of the Aude department
