= Canton of La Vallée de l'Orbiel =

Coordinates: 43.25°N 2.37°E

- Canton
- Situation of the canton of La Vallée de l'Orbiel in the department of Aude
- Country: France
- Region: Occitania
- Department: Aude
- No. of communes: {{{nbcomm}}}
- Population (2023): 17,244
- INSEE code: 1119

The canton of La Vallée de l'Orbiel is an administrative division of the Aude department, southern France. It was created at the French canton reorganisation which came into effect in March 2015. Its seat is in Villemoustaussou.

It consists of the following communes:

1. Aragon
2. Caudebronde
3. Conques-sur-Orbiel
4. Fournes-Cabardès
5. Les Ilhes
6. Labastide-Esparbairenque
7. Lastours
8. Malves-en-Minervois
9. Les Martys
10. Mas-Cabardès
11. Miraval-Cabardes
12. Pennautier
13. Pradelles-Cabardès
14. Roquefère
15. Salsigne
16. La Tourette-Cabardès
17. Ventenac-Cabardès
18. Villalier
19. Villanière
20. Villardonnel
21. Villegailhenc
22. Villemoustaussou
