= Villardonnel =

Commune in Occitanie, France

- Commune
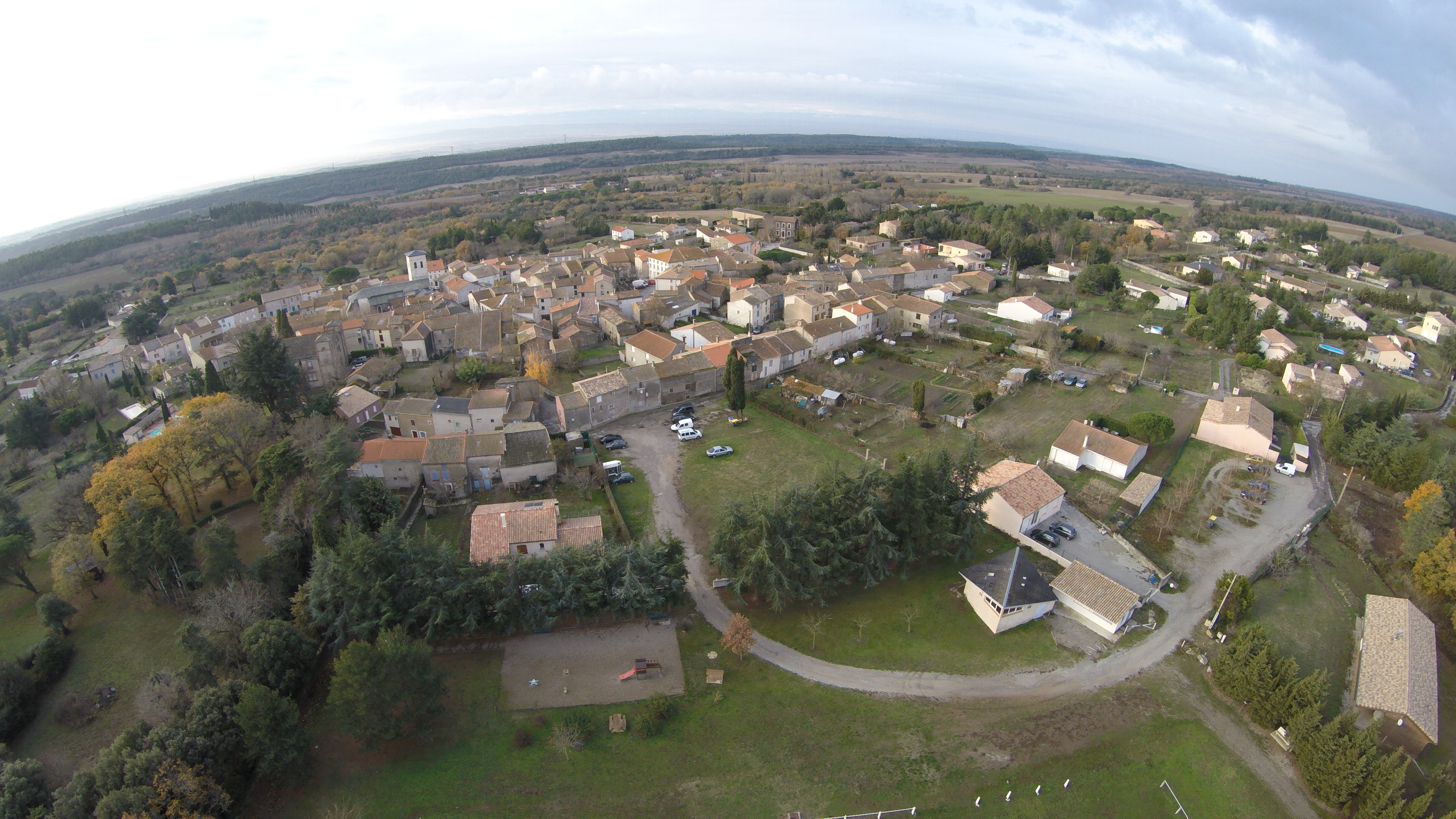
- An aerial view of Villardonnel

- Coat of arms
- Location of Villardonnel
- Location within France Location within Occitanie
- Coordinates: 43°20′10″N 2°18′44″E
- Country: France
- Region: Occitania
- Department: Aude
- Arrondissement: Carcassonne
- Canton: La Vallée de l'Orbiel

Government
  - Mayor (2020–2026): Luciano Stella
- Area^{1}: 16.63 km^{2} (6.42 sq mi)
- Elevation: 358 m (1,175 ft)
- Highest elevation: 550 m (1,800 ft)
- Lowest elevation: 193 m (633 ft)
- Population (2023): 515
  - Density: 31.0/km^{2} (80.2/sq mi)
- Time zone: UTC+01:00 (CET)
  - Summer (DST): UTC+02:00 (CEST)
- INSEE/Postal code: 11413 /11600
- Website: villardonnel.com
- ^{1} French Land Register data, which excludes lakes, ponds, glaciers > 1 km^{2} (0.386 sq mi or 247 acres) and river estuaries.

Villardonnel (French pronunciation: [vilaʁdɔnɛl]; Occitan: Vilardonèl) is a commune in the Aude department in southern France that is located 14 km (8.7 mi) from Carcassonne, the prefecture of the department.

== Population ==
Historical population
| Year | Pop. | ±% p.a. |
|---|---|---|
| 1968 | 317 | — |
| 1975 | 342 | +1.09% |
| 1982 | 331 | −0.47% |
| 1990 | 365 | +1.23% |
| 1999 | 412 | +1.35% |
| 2007 | 530 | +3.20% |
| 2012 | 507 | −0.88% |
| 2017 | 498 | −0.36% |
| 2023 | 515 | +0.56% |
Source: INSEE

== 2018 flood ==
In mid-October 2018, Villegailhenc, Conques-sur-Orbiel, and Villardonnel, and Trèbes, along with nearby areas along the river Aude, were devastated when the river flooded after intense rain. 12 people were killed, including a nun.

== See also ==
- Communes of the Aude department
