= La Tourette-Cabardès =

Commune in Occitanie, France

- Commune
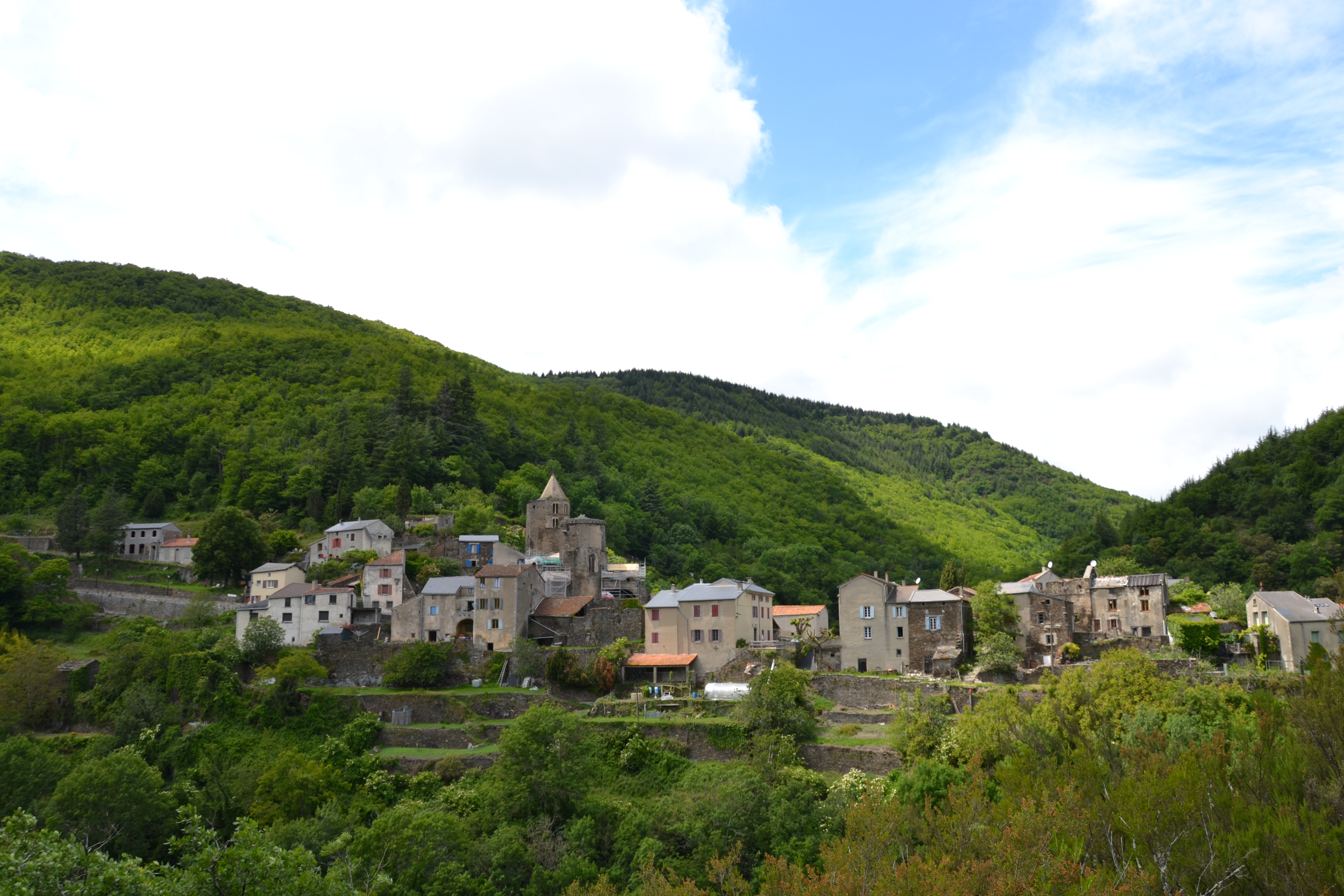
- A general view of La Tourette-Cabardès

- Coat of arms
- Location of La Tourette-Cabardès
- Location within France Location within Occitanie
- Coordinates: 43°22′53″N 2°20′09″E
- Country: France
- Region: Occitania
- Department: Aude
- Arrondissement: Carcassonne
- Canton: La Vallée de l'Orbiel

Government
  - Mayor (2020–2026): Jean-Claude Pech
- Area^{1}: 5.03 km^{2} (1.94 sq mi)
- Elevation: 450 m (1,480 ft)
- Highest elevation: 803 m (2,635 ft)
- Lowest elevation: 355 m (1,165 ft)
- Population (2023): 20
  - Density: 4.0/km^{2} (10/sq mi)
- Time zone: UTC+01:00 (CET)
  - Summer (DST): UTC+02:00 (CEST)
- INSEE/Postal code: 11391 /11380
- ^{1} French Land Register data, which excludes lakes, ponds, glaciers > 1 km^{2} (0.386 sq mi or 247 acres) and river estuaries.

La Tourette-Cabardès (French pronunciation: [la tuʁɛt kabaʁdɛs]; Occitan: La Torreta de Cabardés) is a commune in the Aude department in southern France.

== Population ==
Historical population
Year	Pop.	±% p.a.
1968	36	—
1975	26	−4.54%
1982	19	−4.38%
1990	25	+3.49%
1999	32	+2.78%
2007	24	−3.53%
2012	21	−2.64%
2017	23	+1.84%
2023	20	−2.30%
Source: INSEE

== See also ==
- Communes of the Aude department
