= Les Martys =

Commune in Occitanie, France

- Commune
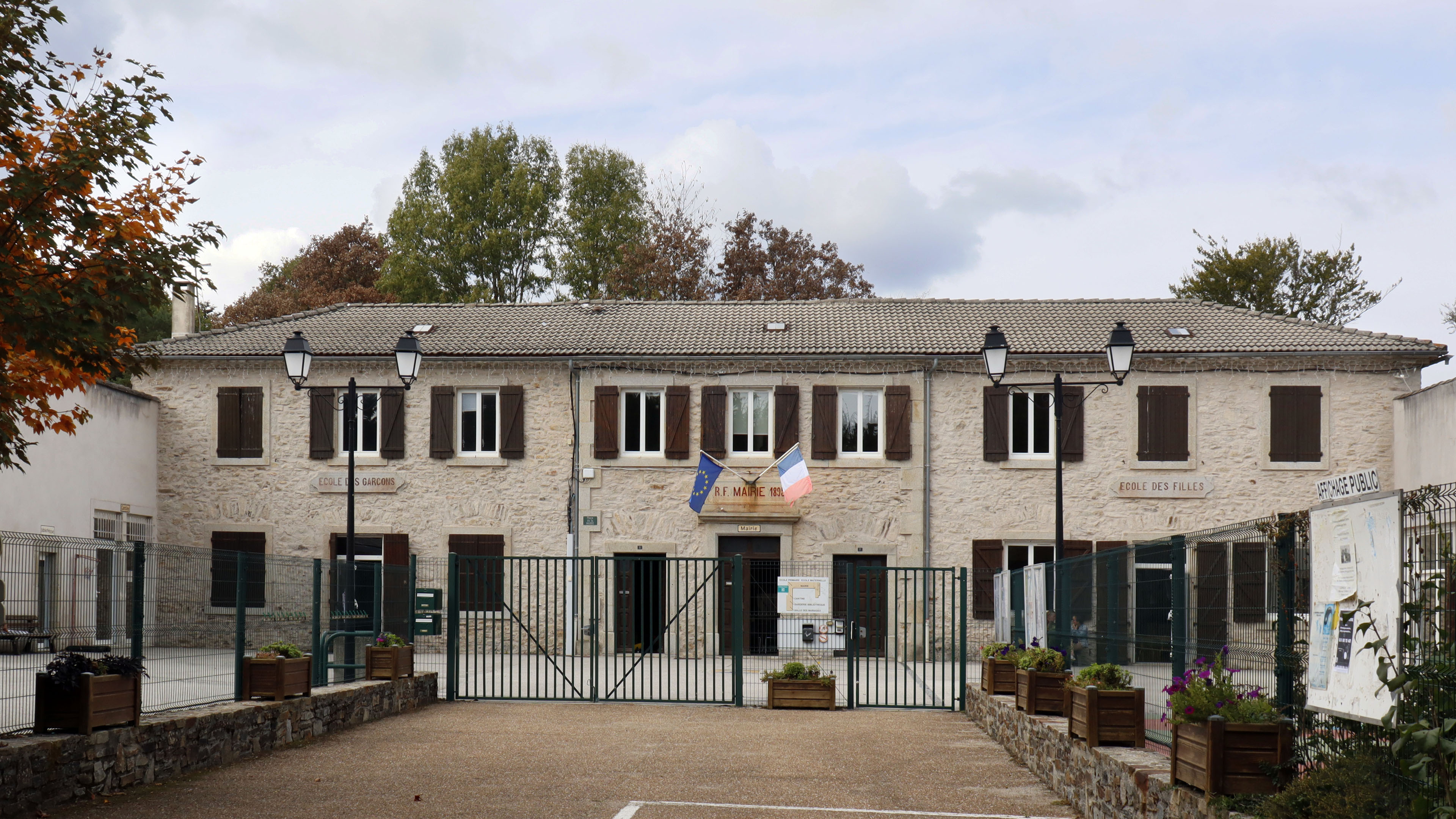
- Les Martys Town hall

- Coat of arms
- Location of Les Martys
- Location within France Location within Occitanie
- Coordinates: 43°25′02″N 2°18′24″E
- Country: France
- Region: Occitania
- Department: Aude
- Arrondissement: Carcassonne
- Canton: La Vallée de l'Orbiel

Government
  - Mayor (2020–2026): Claude Bonnet
- Area^{1}: 19.18 km^{2} (7.41 sq mi)
- Elevation: 770 m (2,530 ft)
- Highest elevation: 964 m (3,163 ft)
- Lowest elevation: 639 m (2,096 ft)
- Population (2023): 309
  - Density: 16.1/km^{2} (41.7/sq mi)
- Time zone: UTC+01:00 (CET)
  - Summer (DST): UTC+02:00 (CEST)
- INSEE/Postal code: 11221 /11390
- ^{1} French Land Register data, which excludes lakes, ponds, glaciers > 1 km^{2} (0.386 sq mi or 247 acres) and river estuaries.

Les Martys (French pronunciation: [le maʁti]; Occitan: Les Martins) is a commune in the Aude department in southern France.

It is located in the Montagne Noire on highway D 118 between Mazamet and Carcassonne.

== Population ==
Historical population
Year	Pop.	±% p.a.
1968	198	—
1975	186	−0.89%
1982	188	+0.15%
1990	183	−0.34%
1999	198	+0.88%
2007	269	+3.90%
2012	270	+0.07%
2017	293	+1.65%
2023	309	+0.89%
Source: INSEE

== See also ==
- Communes of the Aude department
