= Villegailhenc =

Commune in Occitanie, France

- Commune
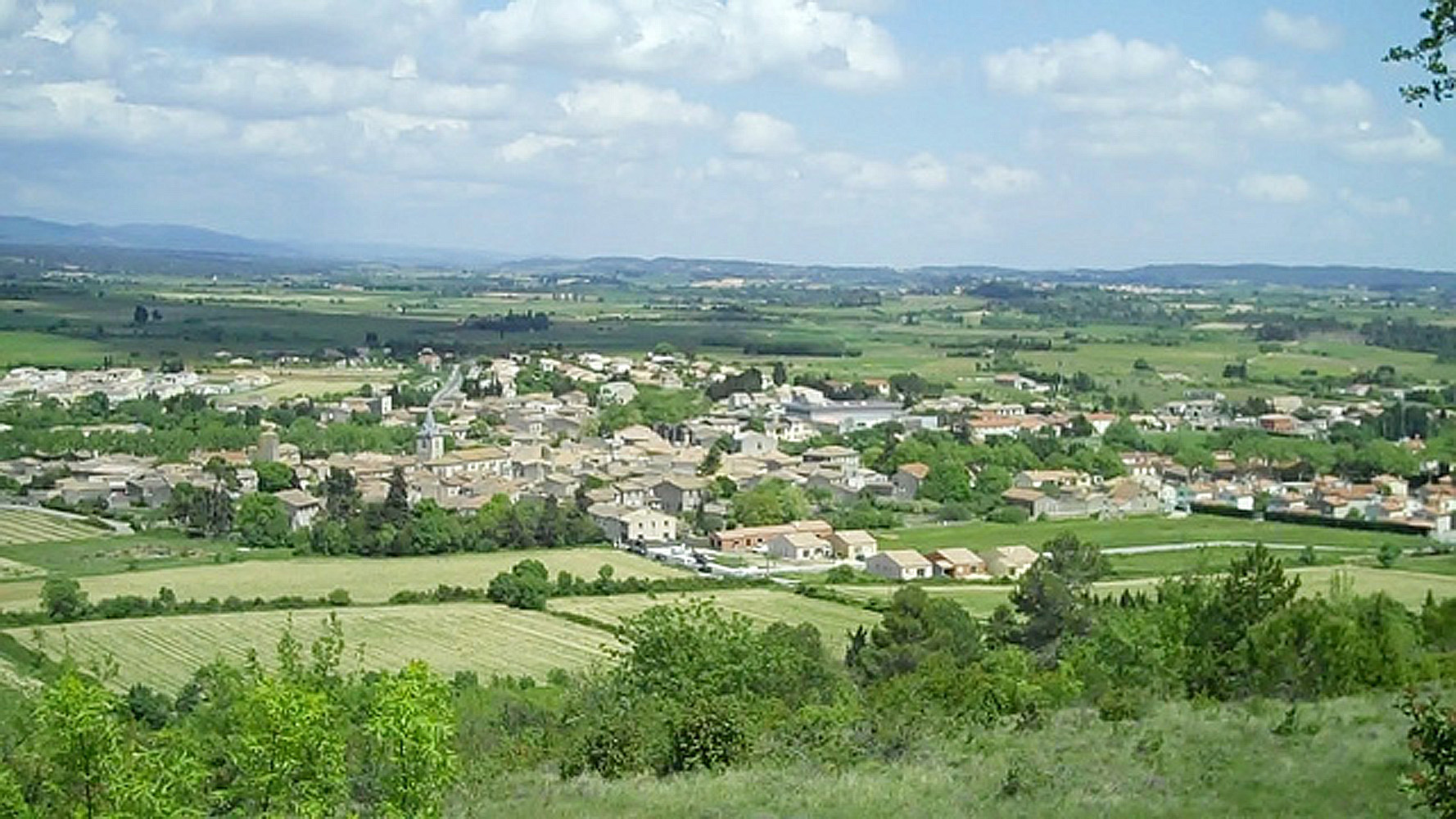
- A general view of Villegailhenc

- Coat of arms
- Location of Villegailhenc
- Location within France Location within Occitanie
- Coordinates: 43°16′12″N 2°21′19″E
- Country: France
- Region: Occitania
- Department: Aude
- Arrondissement: Carcassonne
- Canton: La Vallée de l'Orbiel
- Intercommunality: Carcassonne Agglo

Government
  - Mayor (2020–2026): Michel Proust
- Area^{1}: 4.78 km^{2} (1.85 sq mi)
- Elevation: 127 m (417 ft)
- Highest elevation: 203 m (666 ft)
- Lowest elevation: 109 m (358 ft)
- Population (2023): 1,718
  - Density: 359/km^{2} (931/sq mi)
- Time zone: UTC+01:00 (CET)
  - Summer (DST): UTC+02:00 (CEST)
- INSEE/Postal code: 11425 /11600
- ^{1} French Land Register data, which excludes lakes, ponds, glaciers > 1 km^{2} (0.386 sq mi or 247 acres) and river estuaries.

Villegailhenc (French pronunciation: [vilɡajɛ̃k]; Occitan: Vilagalhenc) is a commune in the Aude department in southern France.

In mid-October 2018, Villegailhenc, Conques-sur-Orbiel, and Villardonnel, and Trèbes, along with nearby areas along the river Aude, were devastated when the river flooded after intense rain. 12 people were killed, including a nun.

== Population ==
Historical population
| Year | Pop. | ±% p.a. |
|---|---|---|
| 1968 | 951 | — |
| 1975 | 1,018 | +0.98% |
| 1982 | 1,275 | +3.27% |
| 1990 | 1,337 | +0.60% |
| 1999 | 1,326 | −0.09% |
| 2007 | 1,625 | +2.57% |
| 2012 | 1,649 | +0.29% |
| 2017 | 1,735 | +1.02% |
| 2023 | 1,718 | −0.16% |
Source: INSEE

== See also ==
- Communes of the Aude department
