= Roquefère =

Commune in Occitanie, France

- Commune
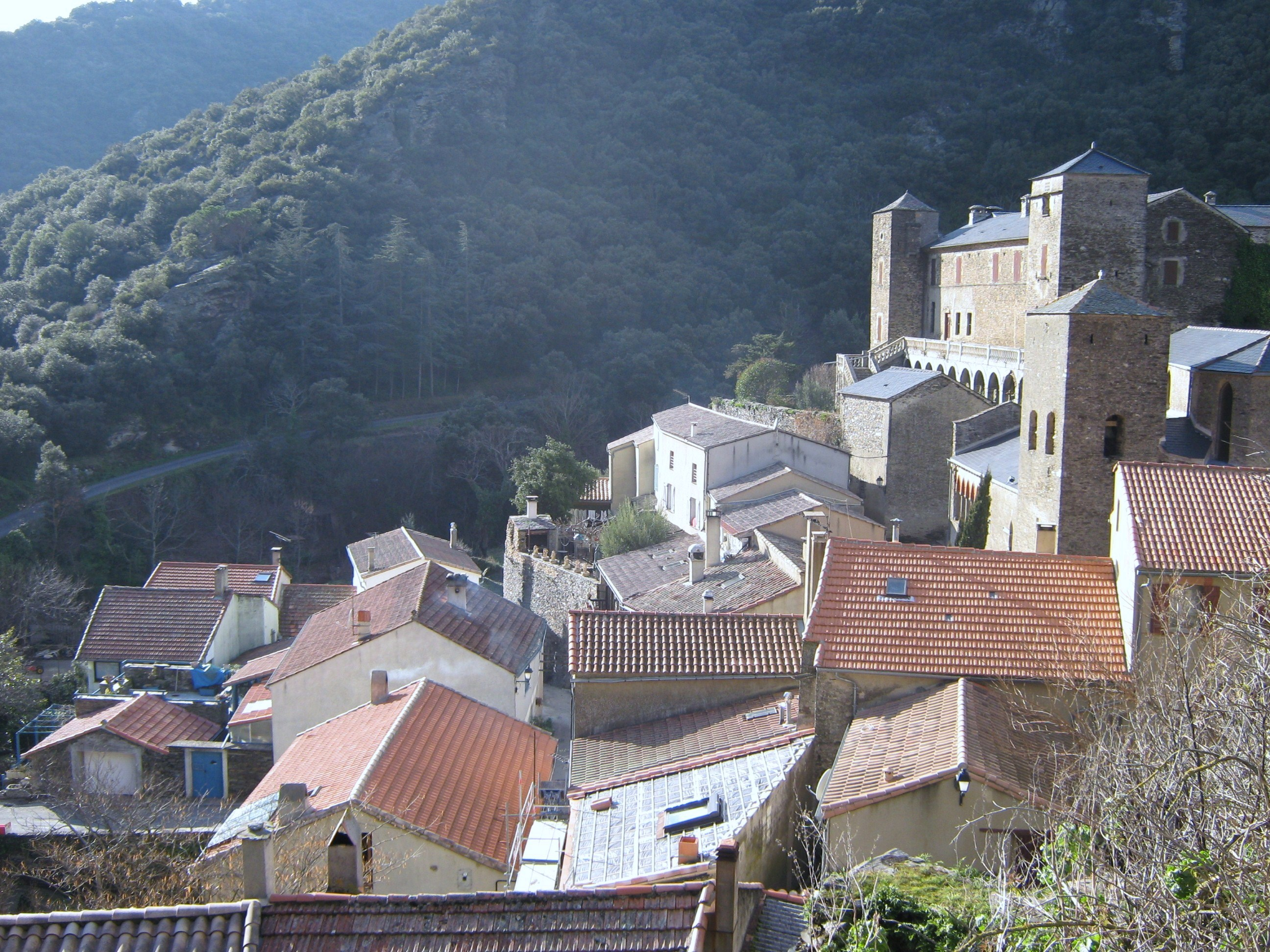
- A general view of Roquefère

- Coat of arms
- Location of Roquefère
- Location within France Location within Occitanie
- Coordinates: 43°22′28″N 2°22′50″E
- Country: France
- Region: Occitania
- Department: Aude
- Arrondissement: Carcassonne
- Canton: La Vallée de l'Orbiel

Government
  - Mayor (2020–2026): Francis Bels
- Area^{1}: 8.06 km^{2} (3.11 sq mi)
- Elevation: 350 m (1,150 ft)
- Highest elevation: 983 m (3,225 ft)
- Lowest elevation: 299 m (981 ft)
- Population (2023): 69
  - Density: 8.6/km^{2} (22/sq mi)
- Time zone: UTC+01:00 (CET)
  - Summer (DST): UTC+02:00 (CEST)
- INSEE/Postal code: 11319 /11380
- ^{1} French Land Register data, which excludes lakes, ponds, glaciers > 1 km^{2} (0.386 sq mi or 247 acres) and river estuaries.

Roquefère (French pronunciation: [ʁɔkfɛʁ]; Occitan: Ròcafèra) is a commune in the Aude department in southern France.

== Population ==
Historical population
| Year | Pop. | ±% p.a. |
|---|---|---|
| 1968 | 50 | — |
| 1975 | 39 | −3.49% |
| 1982 | 44 | +1.74% |
| 1990 | 57 | +3.29% |
| 1999 | 56 | −0.20% |
| 2007 | 78 | +4.23% |
| 2012 | 68 | −2.71% |
| 2017 | 79 | +3.04% |
| 2023 | 69 | −2.23% |
Source: INSEE

== See also ==
- Communes of the Aude department
