= Trèbes =

Commune in Occitanie, France

- Commune
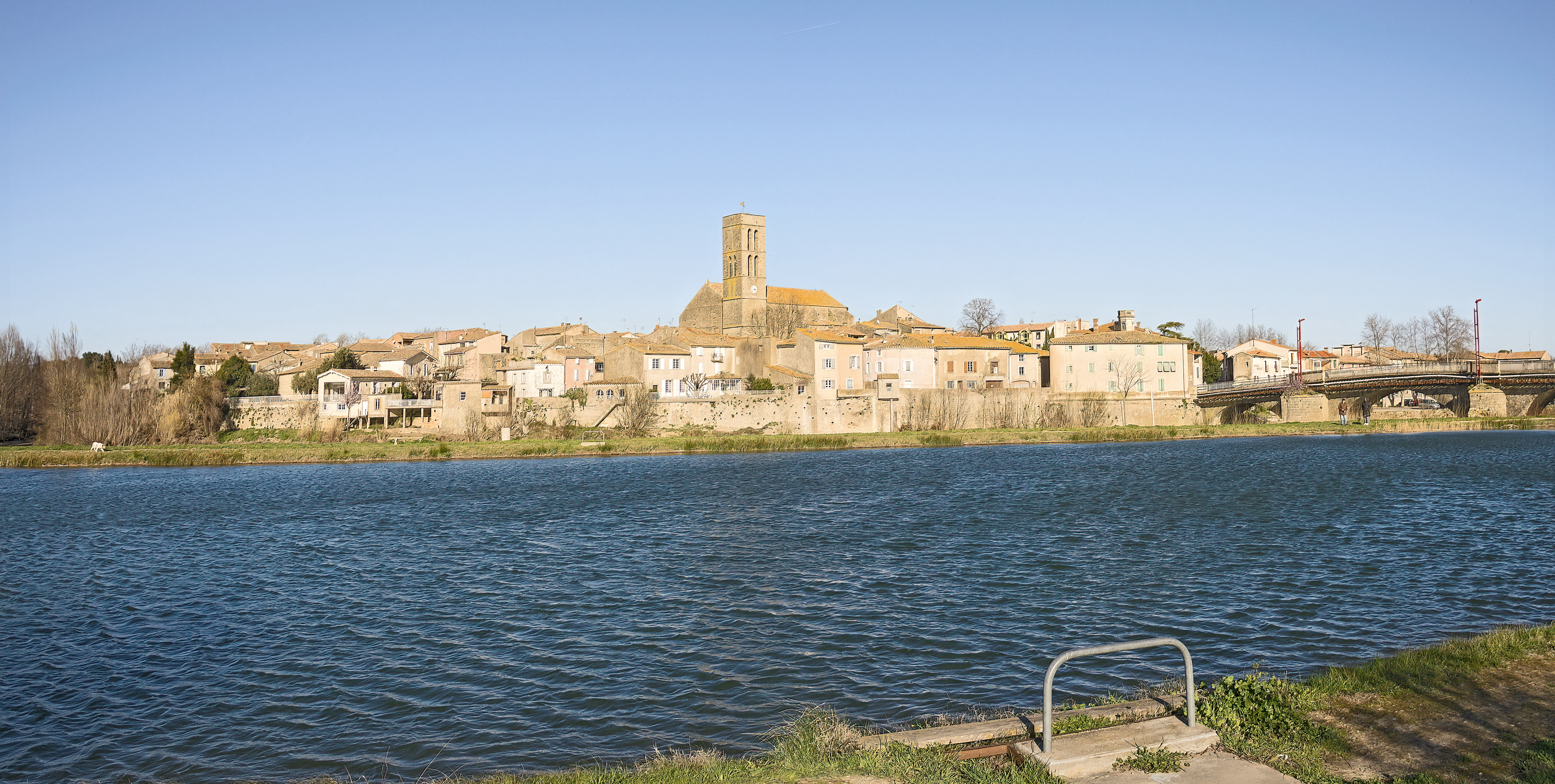
- A general view of Trèbes

- Coat of arms
- Location of Trèbes
- Location within France Location within Occitanie
- Coordinates: 43°12′38″N 2°26′32″E
- Country: France
- Region: Occitania
- Department: Aude
- Arrondissement: Carcassonne
- Canton: La Montagne d'Alaric
- Intercommunality: Carcassonne Agglo

Government
  - Mayor (2020–2026): Éric Ménassi
- Area^{1}: 16.36 km^{2} (6.32 sq mi)
- Highest elevation: 161 m (528 ft)
- Lowest elevation: 67 m (220 ft)
- Population (2023): 5,361
  - Density: 327.7/km^{2} (848.7/sq mi)
- Time zone: UTC+01:00 (CET)
  - Summer (DST): UTC+02:00 (CEST)
- INSEE/Postal code: 11397 /11800
- ^{1} French Land Register data, which excludes lakes, ponds, glaciers > 1 km^{2} (0.386 sq mi or 247 acres) and river estuaries.

Trèbes (French pronunciation: [tʁɛb]; Occitan: Trebes) is a commune in the Aude department, southern France. It is around 7 km east of the centre of Carcassonne.

== History ==
Located on an important river crossing, Trèbes was originally known as Tresmals (Three Fords) but in 1110 residents petitioned for the name to be changed to Trèbes (Three Goods) since Tresmals could also be parsed as "Three Evils".

In mid-October 2018, Villegailhenc, Conques-sur-Orbiel, and Villardonnel, and Trèbes, along with nearby areas along the river Aude, were devastated when the river flooded after intense rain. 12 people were killed, including a nun.

In March 2018, a hostage crisis took place in a supermarket in the town as part of a series of terrorist attacks in the area. Following the resolution of the standoff, five people were dead, including the attacker and a gendarme.

The death toll from flash floods rises to 13 in October 2018.

== Population ==
Historical population

Year	Pop.	±% p.a.
1793	1,087	—
1800	1,087	+0.00%
1806	1,206	+1.75%
1821	1,387	+0.94%
1831	1,607	+1.48%
1836	1,707	+1.21%
1841	1,773	+0.76%
1846	1,901	+1.40%
1851	1,871	−0.32%
1856	1,888	+0.18%
1861	1,714	−1.92%
1866	1,764	+0.58%
1872	1,765	+0.01%
1876	2,001	+3.19%
1881	2,171	+1.64%
1886	2,209	+0.35%
1891	1,858	−3.40%
1896	1,804	−0.59%
1901	1,840	+0.40%

Year	Pop.	±% p.a.
1906	2,006	+1.74%
1911	1,962	−0.44%
1921	2,000	+0.19%
1926	1,992	−0.08%
1931	2,021	+0.29%
1936	2,068	+0.46%
1946	2,057	−0.05%
1954	2,179	+0.72%
1962	2,294	+0.64%
1968	2,958	+4.33%
1975	4,007	+4.43%
1982	5,526	+4.70%
1990	5,575	+0.11%
1999	5,495	−0.16%
2007	5,643	+0.33%
2012	5,280	−1.32%
2017	5,601	+1.19%
2023	5,361	−0.73%

Source: EHESS and INSEE (1968-2023)

== Gallery ==
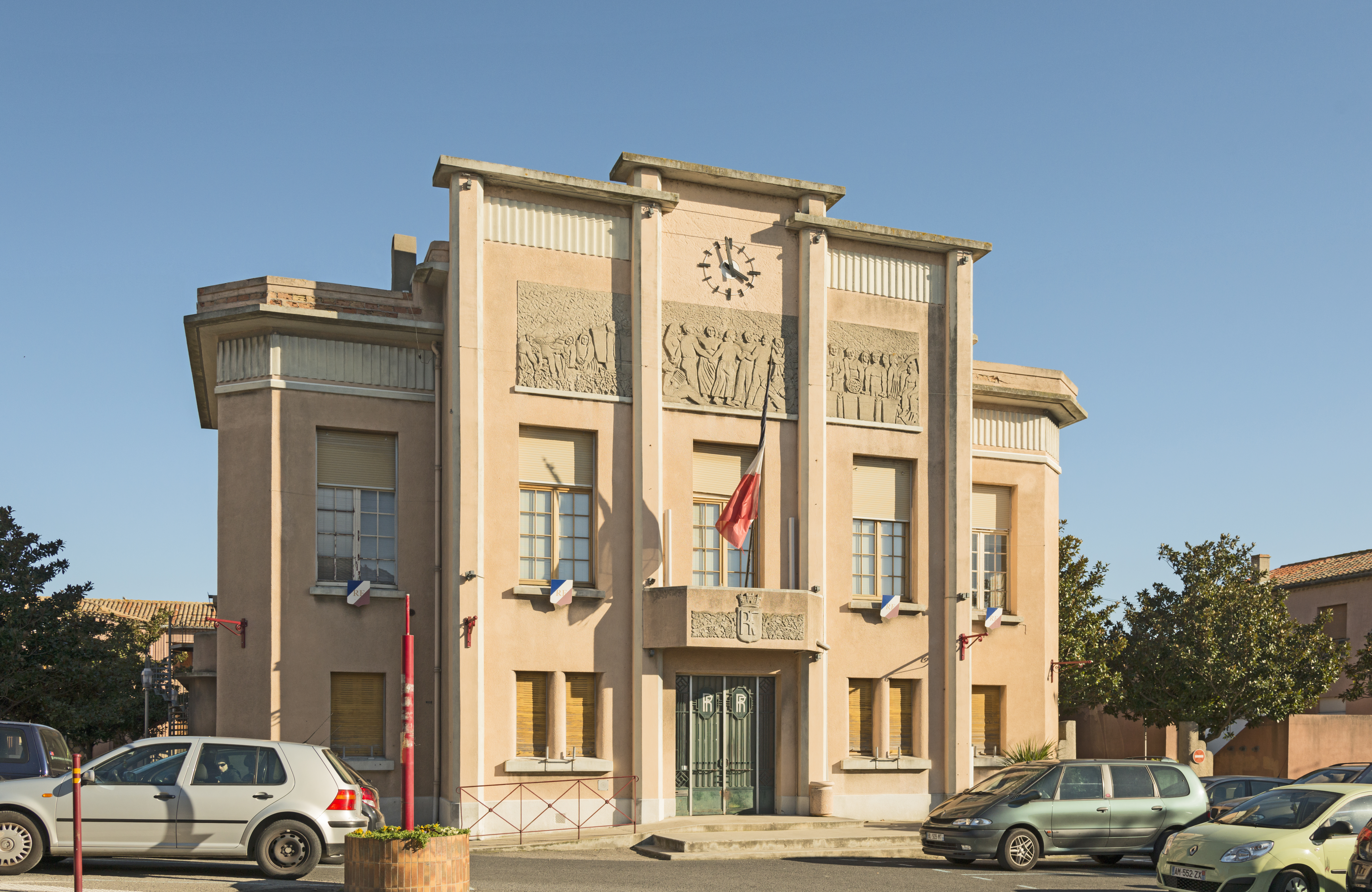
Town hall

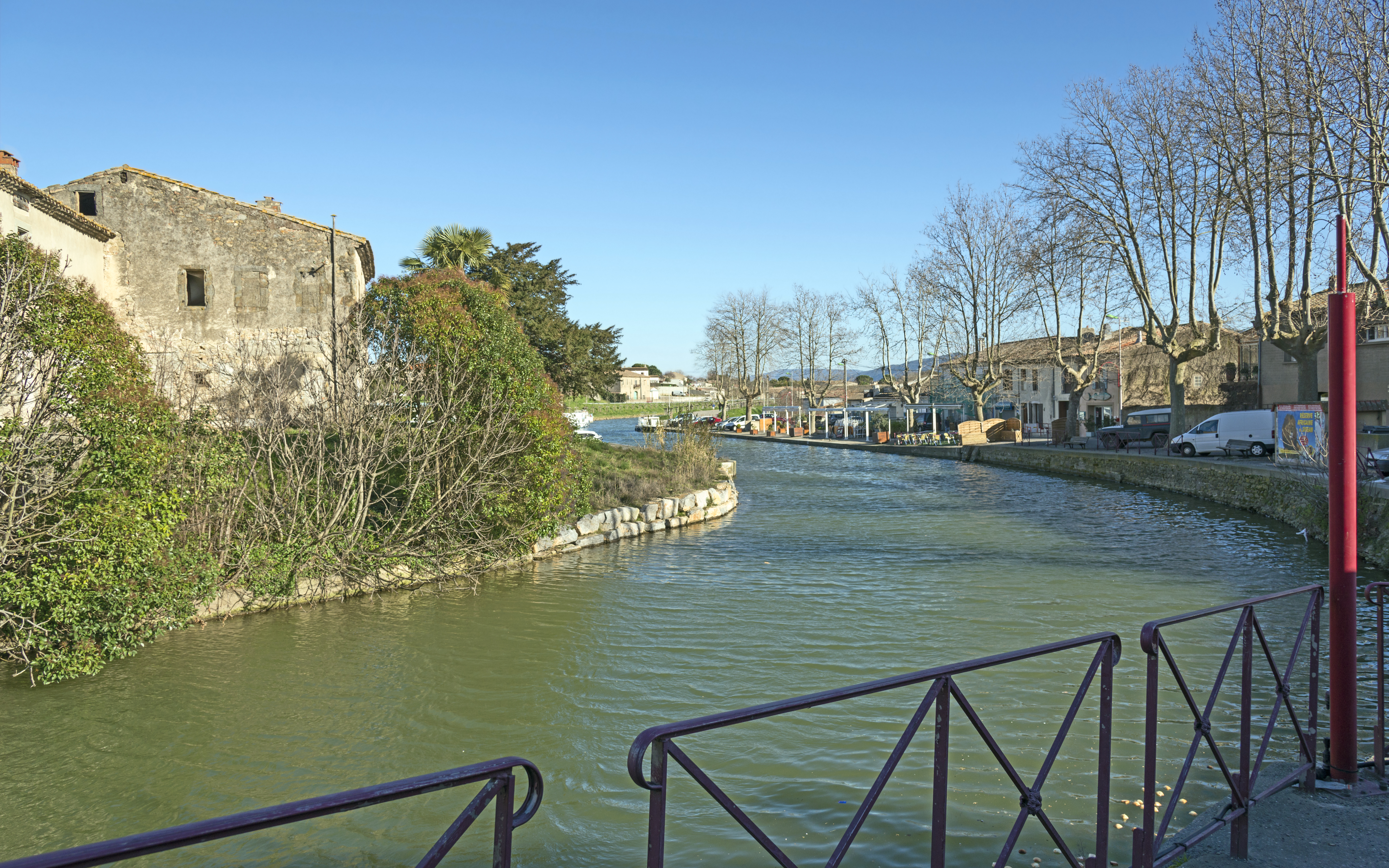
Canal du Midi in Trèbes

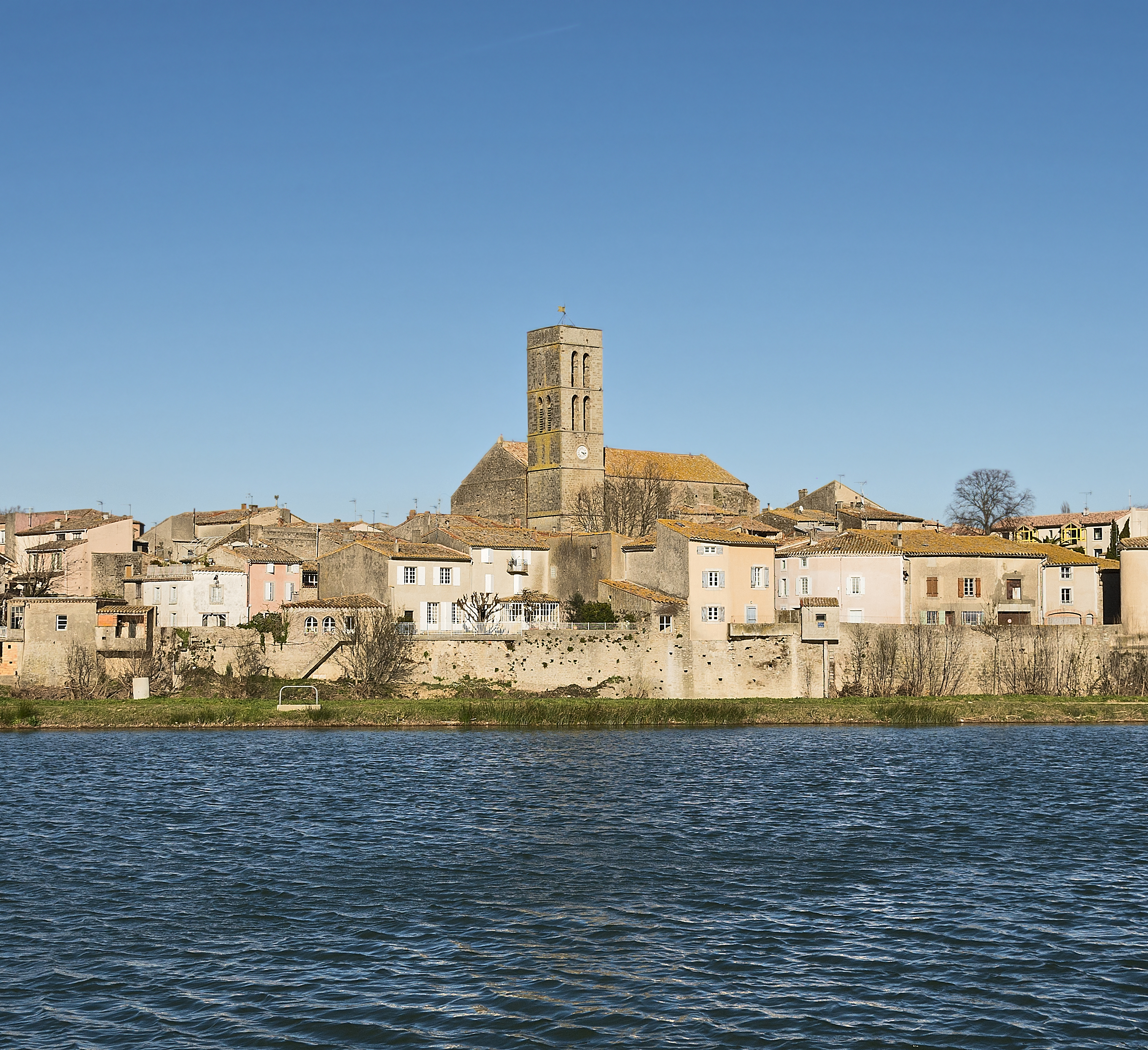
Church Saint-Étienne

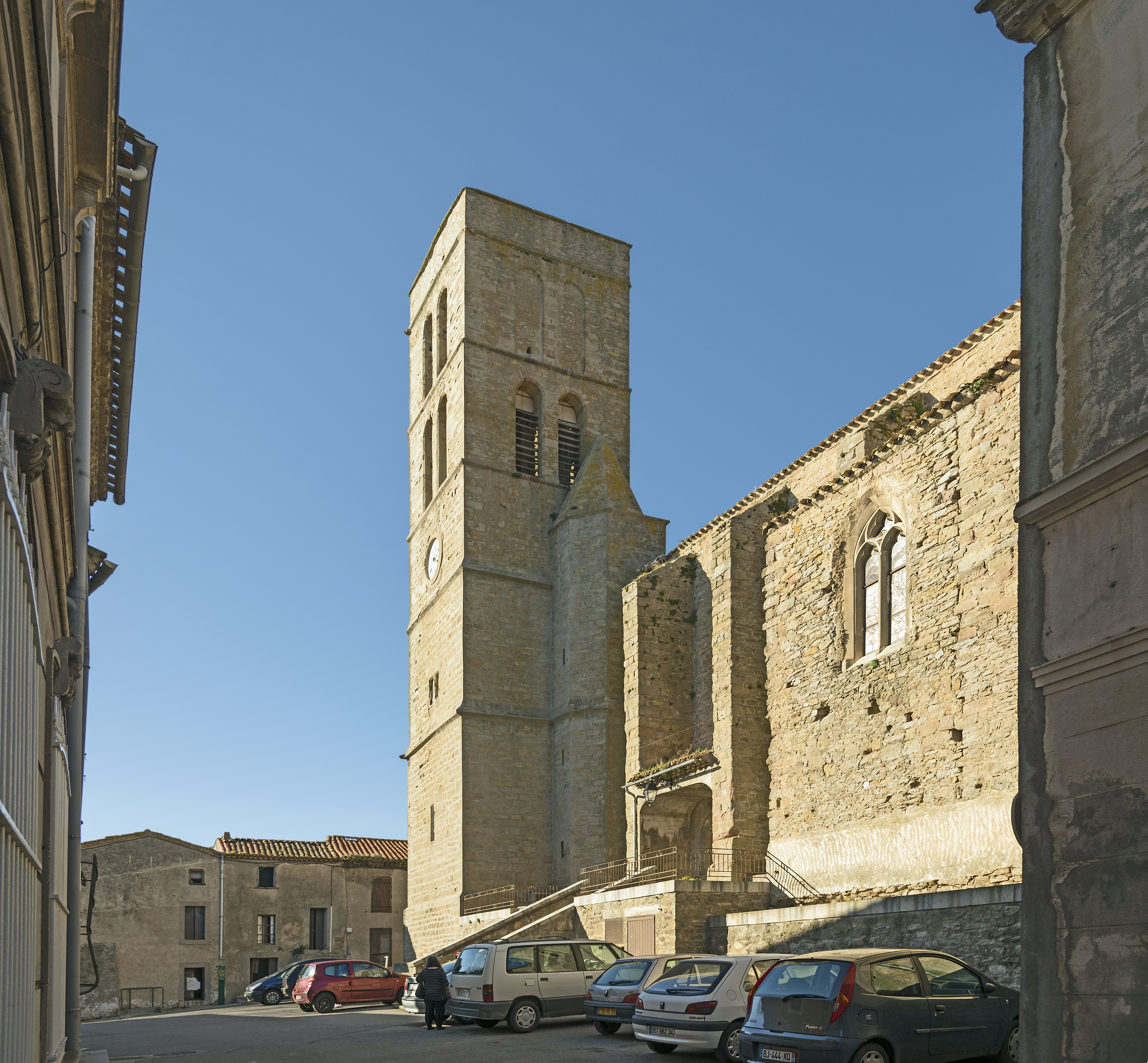

== See also ==
- Communes of the Aude department
