= Villemoustaussou =

Commune in Occitanie, France

- Commune
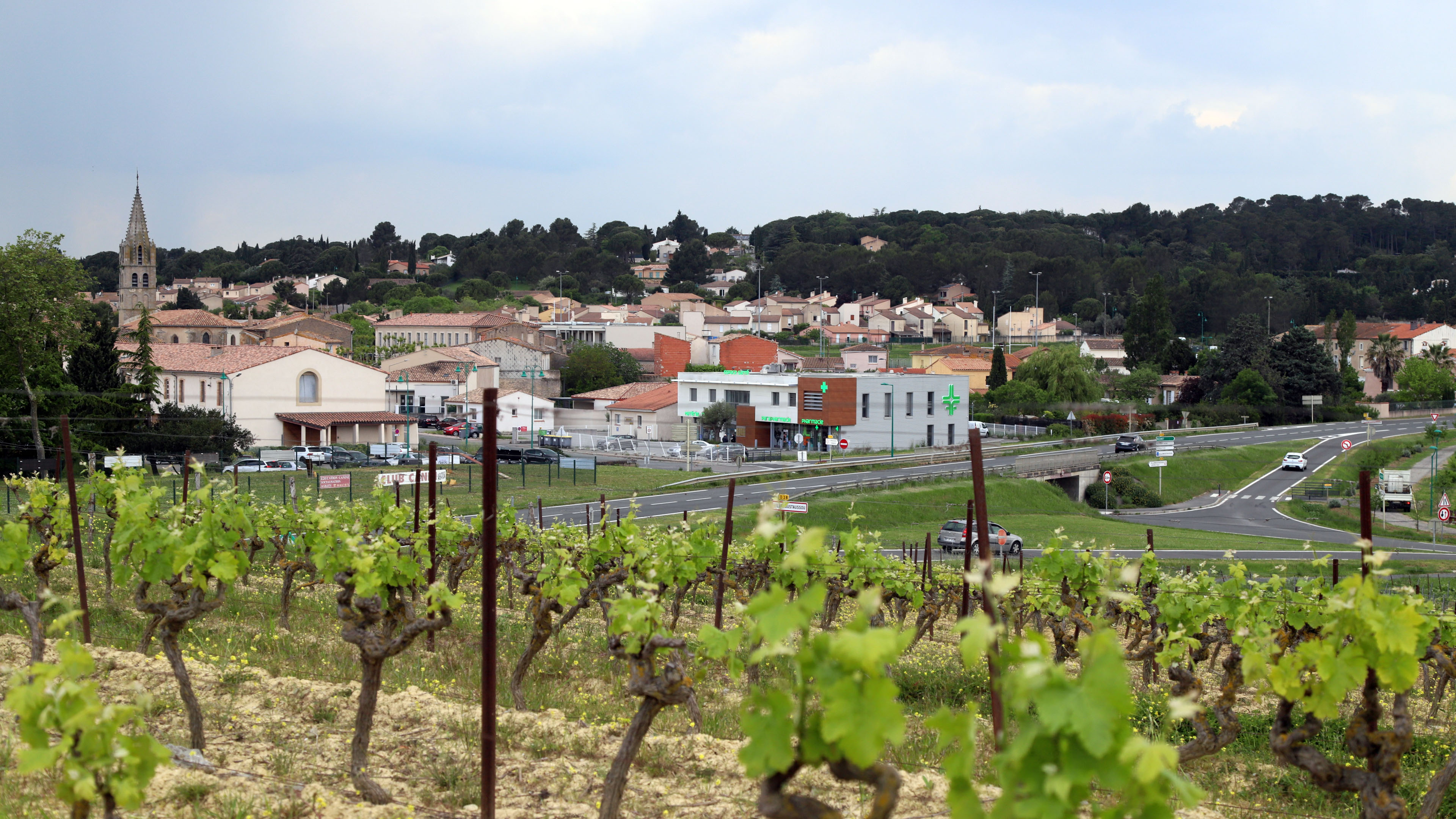
- View of Villemoustaussou

- Coat of arms
- Location of Villemoustaussou
- Location within France Location within Occitanie
- Coordinates: 43°15′11″N 2°21′55″E
- Country: France
- Region: Occitania
- Department: Aude
- Arrondissement: Carcassonne
- Canton: La Vallée de l'Orbiel
- Intercommunality: Carcassonne Agglo

Government
  - Mayor (2020–2026): Bruno Giacomel
- Area^{1}: 11.94 km^{2} (4.61 sq mi)
- Elevation: 108 m (354 ft)
- Highest elevation: 180 m (590 ft)
- Lowest elevation: 84 m (276 ft)
- Population (2023): 4,401
  - Density: 368.6/km^{2} (954.7/sq mi)
- Time zone: UTC+01:00 (CET)
  - Summer (DST): UTC+02:00 (CEST)
- INSEE/Postal code: 11429 /11620
- ^{1} French Land Register data, which excludes lakes, ponds, glaciers > 1 km^{2} (0.386 sq mi or 247 acres) and river estuaries.

Villemoustaussou (French pronunciation: [vilmustosu]; Languedocien: Vilamostausson) is a commune in the Aude department in southern France.

== Population ==
The inhabitants of the commune are known as Villemachois in French.

Historical population
Year	Pop.	±% p.a.
1968	1,059	—
1975	1,706	+7.05%
1982	2,254	+4.06%
1990	2,729	+2.42%
1999	2,696	−0.14%
2007	3,082	+1.69%
2012	3,942	+5.05%
2017	4,423	+2.33%
2023	4,401	−0.08%
Source: INSEE

== See also ==
- Communes of the Aude department
- List of works by James Pradier
