= Miraval-Cabardès =

Commune in Occitanie, France

- Commune
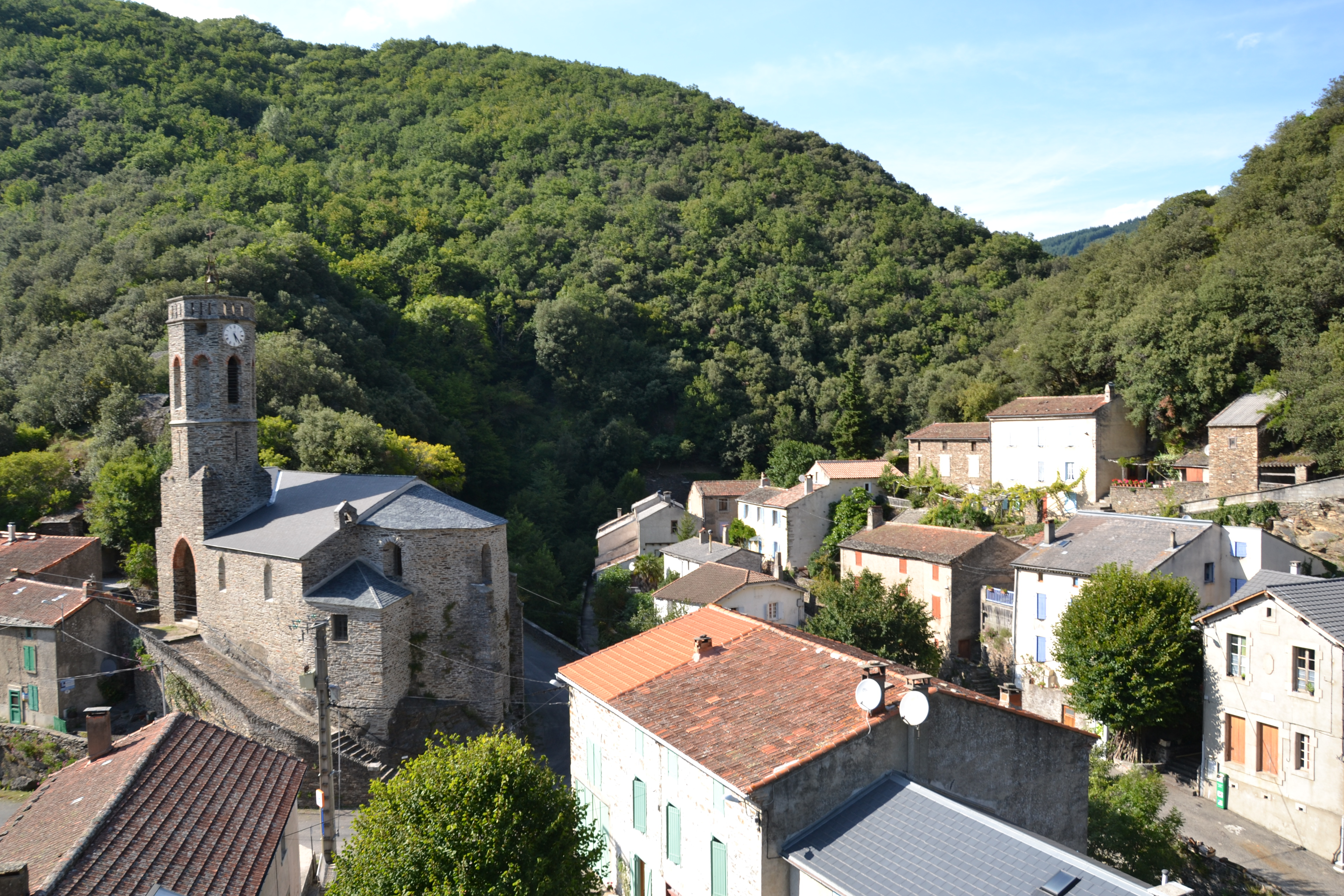
- A general view of Miraval-Cabardès

- Coat of arms
- Location of Miraval-Cabardès
- Location within France Location within Occitanie
- Coordinates: 43°23′00″N 2°20′49″E
- Country: France
- Region: Occitania
- Department: Aude
- Arrondissement: Carcassonne
- Canton: La Vallée de l'Orbiel

Government
  - Mayor (2020–2026): Gérard Fernandez
- Area^{1}: 12.16 km^{2} (4.70 sq mi)
- Elevation: 400 m (1,300 ft)
- Highest elevation: 848 m (2,782 ft)
- Lowest elevation: 313 m (1,027 ft)
- Population (2023): 59
  - Density: 4.9/km^{2} (13/sq mi)
- Time zone: UTC+01:00 (CET)
  - Summer (DST): UTC+02:00 (CEST)
- INSEE/Postal code: 11232 /11380
- ^{1} French Land Register data, which excludes lakes, ponds, glaciers > 1 km^{2} (0.386 sq mi or 247 acres) and river estuaries.

Miraval-Cabardès (French pronunciation: [miʁaval kabaʁdɛs]; Occitan: Miraval de Cabardés) is a commune in the Aude department in the south of France.

== Population ==
Historical population
| Year | Pop. | ±% p.a. |
|---|---|---|
| 1968 | 54 | — |
| 1975 | 52 | −0.54% |
| 1982 | 33 | −6.29% |
| 1990 | 44 | +3.66% |
| 1999 | 48 | +0.97% |
| 2007 | 45 | −0.80% |
| 2012 | 38 | −3.32% |
| 2017 | 46 | +3.90% |
| 2023 | 59 | +4.24% |
Source: INSEE

== See also ==
- Communes of the Aude department
