= Malves-en-Minervois =

Commune in Occitanie, France

- Commune
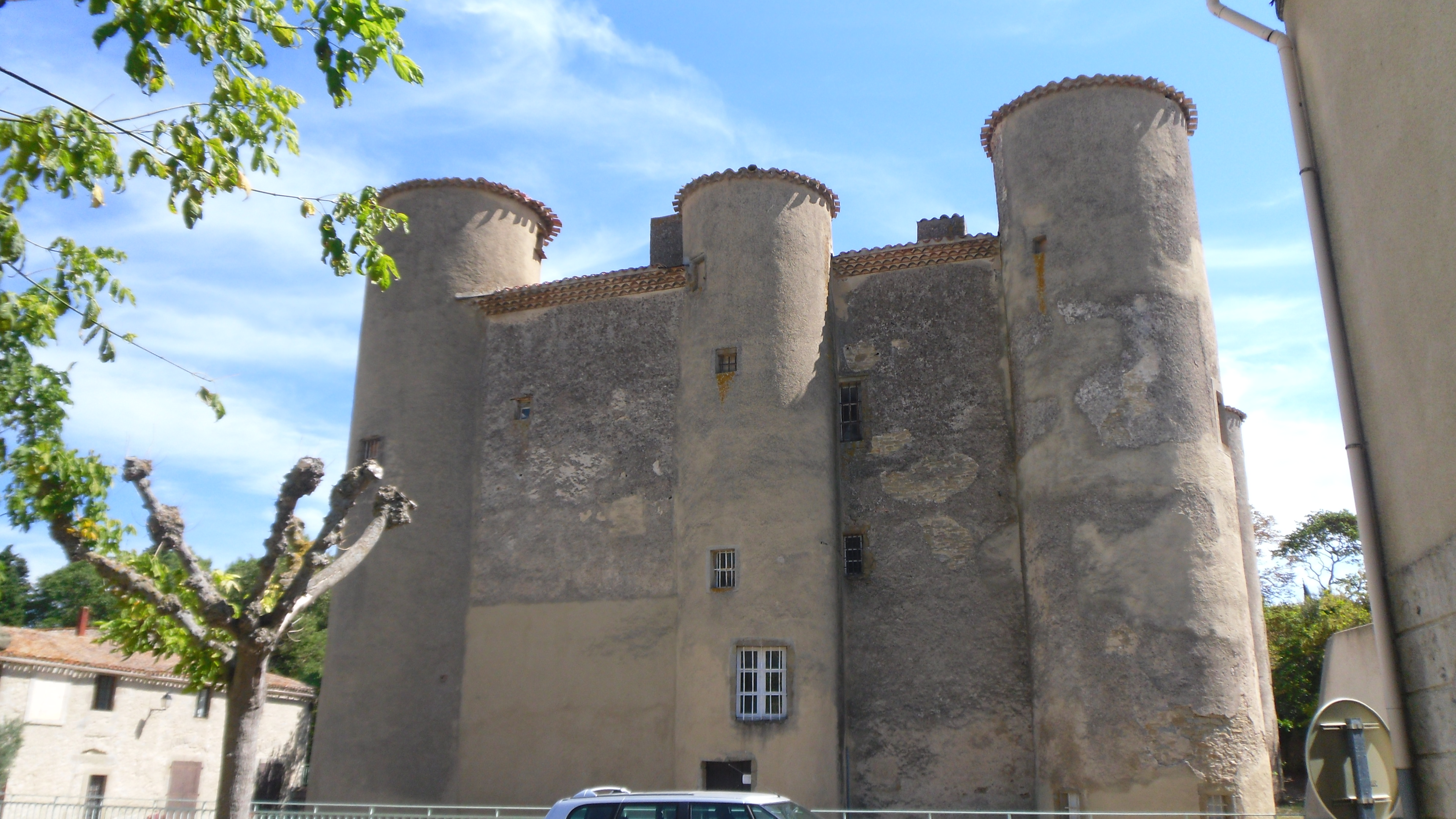
- Chateau

- Coat of arms
- Location of Malves-en-Minervois
- Location within France Location within Occitanie
- Coordinates: 43°15′11″N 2°26′29″E
- Country: France
- Region: Occitania
- Department: Aude
- Arrondissement: Carcassonne
- Canton: La Vallée de l'Orbiel
- Intercommunality: Carcassonne Agglo

Government
  - Mayor (2020–2026): Régis Pommies
- Area^{1}: 4.88 km^{2} (1.88 sq mi)
- Elevation: 179 m (587 ft)
- Highest elevation: 194 m (636 ft)
- Lowest elevation: 100 m (330 ft)
- Population (2023): 888
  - Density: 182/km^{2} (471/sq mi)
- Time zone: UTC+01:00 (CET)
  - Summer (DST): UTC+02:00 (CEST)
- INSEE/Postal code: 11215 /11600
- ^{1} French Land Register data, which excludes lakes, ponds, glaciers > 1 km^{2} (0.386 sq mi or 247 acres) and river estuaries.

Malves-en-Minervois is a commune in the Aude department in southern France.

== Population ==
Historical population
Year	Pop.	±% p.a.
1968	295	—
1975	322	+1.26%
1982	536	+7.55%
1990	708	+3.54%
1999	755	+0.72%
2007	746	−0.15%
2012	821	+1.93%
2017	854	+0.79%
2023	888	+0.65%
Source: INSEE

== See also ==
- Communes of the Aude department
