= Villanière =

Commune in Occitanie, France

- Commune
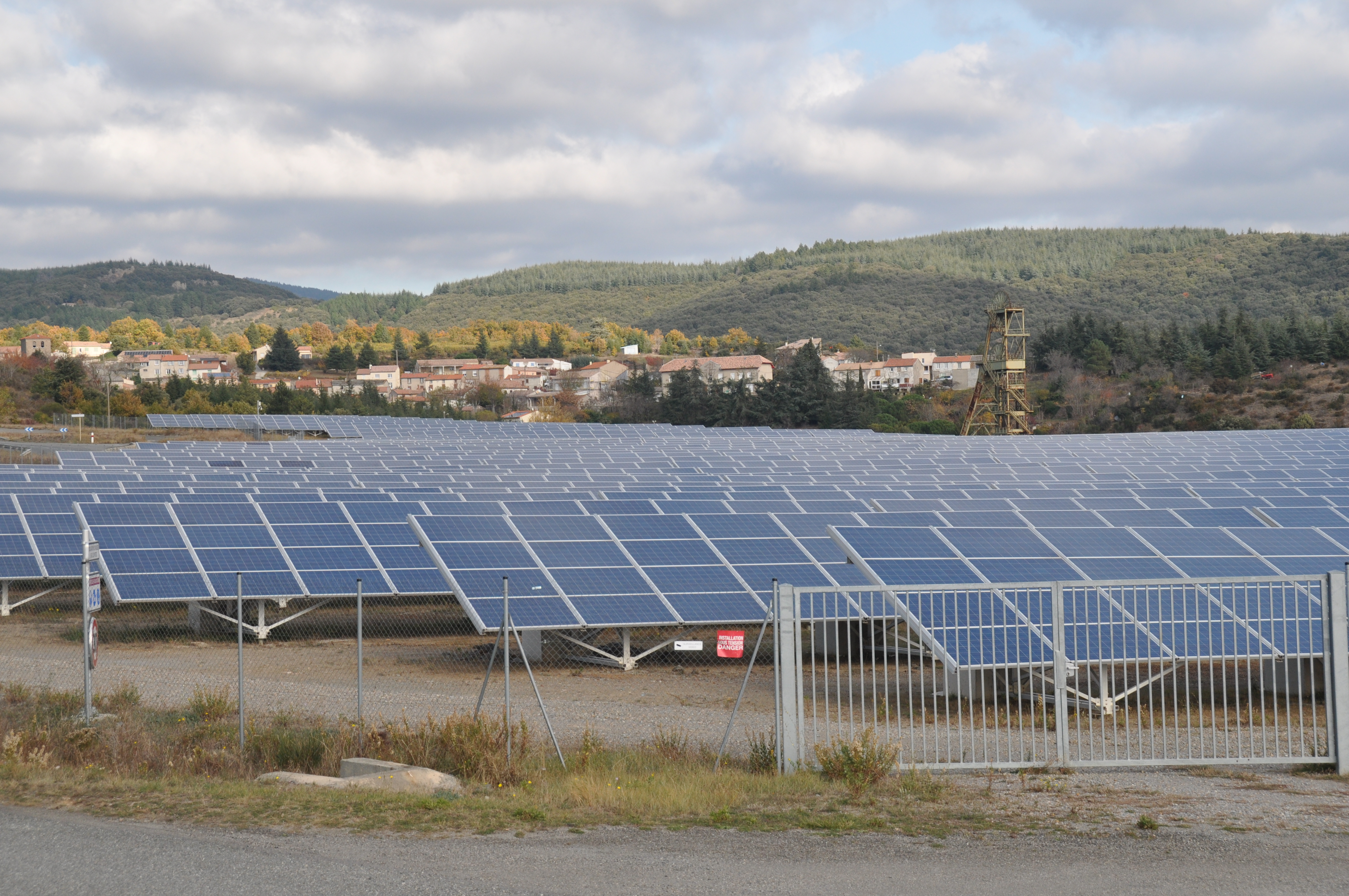
- The solar farm and village of Villanière

- Coat of arms
- Location of Villanière
- Location within France Location within Occitanie
- Coordinates: 43°20′34″N 2°21′42″E
- Country: France
- Region: Occitania
- Department: Aude
- Arrondissement: Carcassonne
- Canton: La Vallée de l'Orbiel
- Intercommunality: Montagne Noire

Government
  - Mayor (2020–2026): Guy Auguste Caly
- Area^{1}: 7.04 km^{2} (2.72 sq mi)
- Elevation: 360 m (1,180 ft)
- Highest elevation: 615 m (2,018 ft)
- Lowest elevation: 240 m (790 ft)
- Population (2023): 152
  - Density: 21.6/km^{2} (55.9/sq mi)
- Time zone: UTC+01:00 (CET)
  - Summer (DST): UTC+02:00 (CEST)
- INSEE/Postal code: 11411 /11600
- ^{1} French Land Register data, which excludes lakes, ponds, glaciers > 1 km^{2} (0.386 sq mi or 247 acres) and river estuaries.

Villanière (French pronunciation: [vilanjɛʁ]; Occitan: Vilanièra) is a commune in the Aude department in southern France.

== Population ==
Historical population
| Year | Pop. | ±% p.a. |
|---|---|---|
| 1968 | 200 | — |
| 1975 | 140 | −4.97% |
| 1982 | 145 | +0.50% |
| 1990 | 133 | −1.07% |
| 1999 | 100 | −3.12% |
| 2007 | 124 | +2.73% |
| 2012 | 161 | +5.36% |
| 2017 | 137 | −3.18% |
| 2023 | 152 | +1.75% |
Source: INSEE

== See also ==
- Communes of the Aude department
