= Salsigne =

Commune in Occitanie, France

- Commune
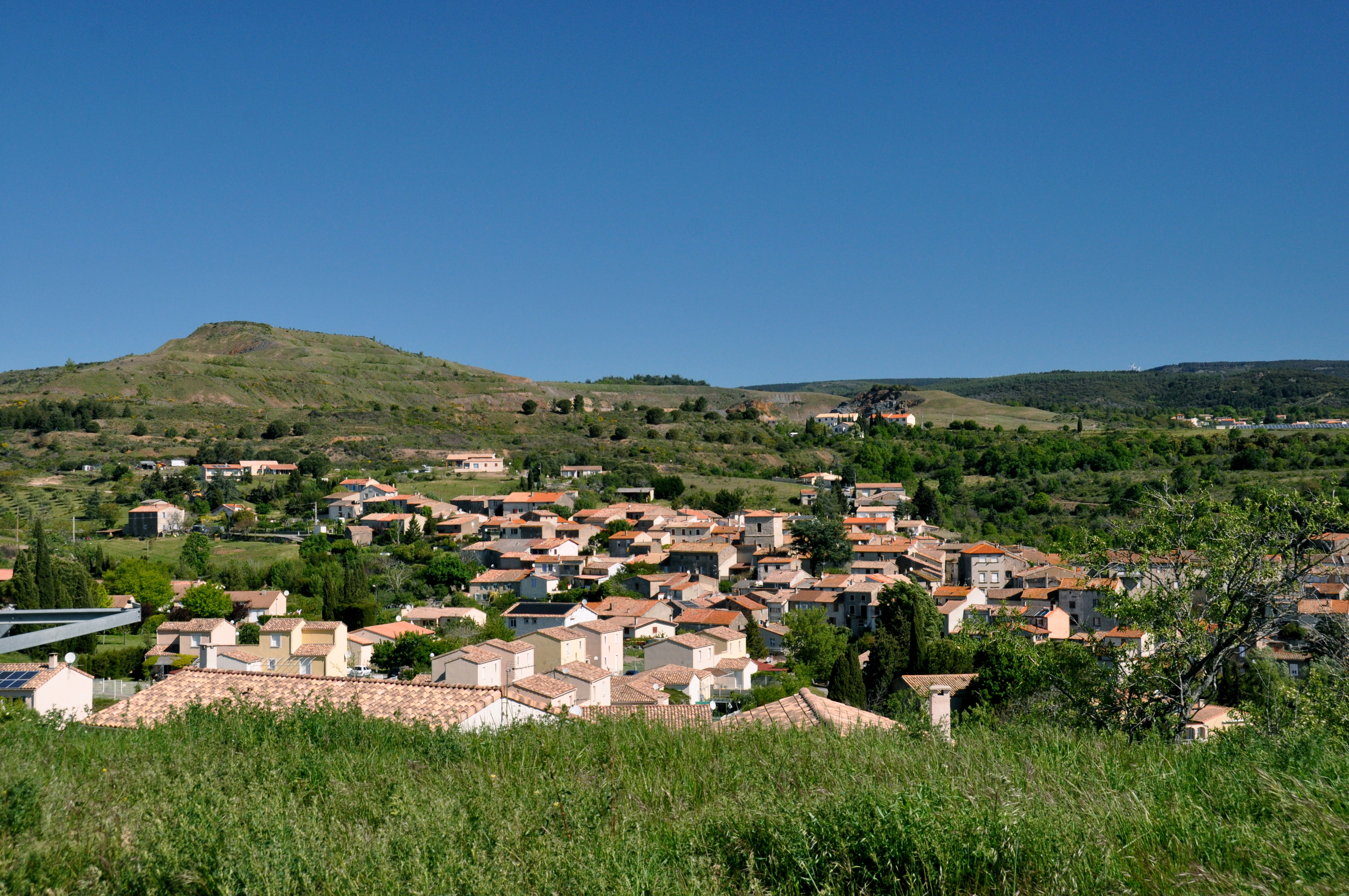
- A general view of Salsigne

- Coat of arms
- Location of Salsigne
- Location within France Location within Occitanie
- Coordinates: 43°19′50″N 2°21′29″E
- Country: France
- Region: Occitania
- Department: Aude
- Arrondissement: Carcassonne
- Canton: La Vallée de l'Orbiel

Government
  - Mayor (2020–2026): Stéphane Barthas
- Area^{1}: 11.48 km^{2} (4.43 sq mi)
- Elevation: 289 m (948 ft)
- Highest elevation: 472 m (1,549 ft)
- Lowest elevation: 166 m (545 ft)
- Population (2023): 400
  - Density: 35/km^{2} (90/sq mi)
- Time zone: UTC+01:00 (CET)
  - Summer (DST): UTC+02:00 (CEST)
- INSEE/Postal code: 11372 /11600
- ^{1} French Land Register data, which excludes lakes, ponds, glaciers > 1 km^{2} (0.386 sq mi or 247 acres) and river estuaries.

Salsigne (French pronunciation: [salsiɲ]; Occitan: Salsinha) is a commune in the Aude department in southern France.

== Population ==
Historical population
Year	Pop.	±% p.a.
1968	689	—
1975	571	−2.65%
1982	436	−3.78%
1990	372	−1.96%
1999	354	−0.55%
2007	370	+0.55%
2012	389	+1.01%
2017	390	+0.05%
2023	400	+0.42%
Source: INSEE

== See also ==
- Communes of the Aude department
