= Pradelles-Cabardès =

Commune in Occitanie, France

- Commune
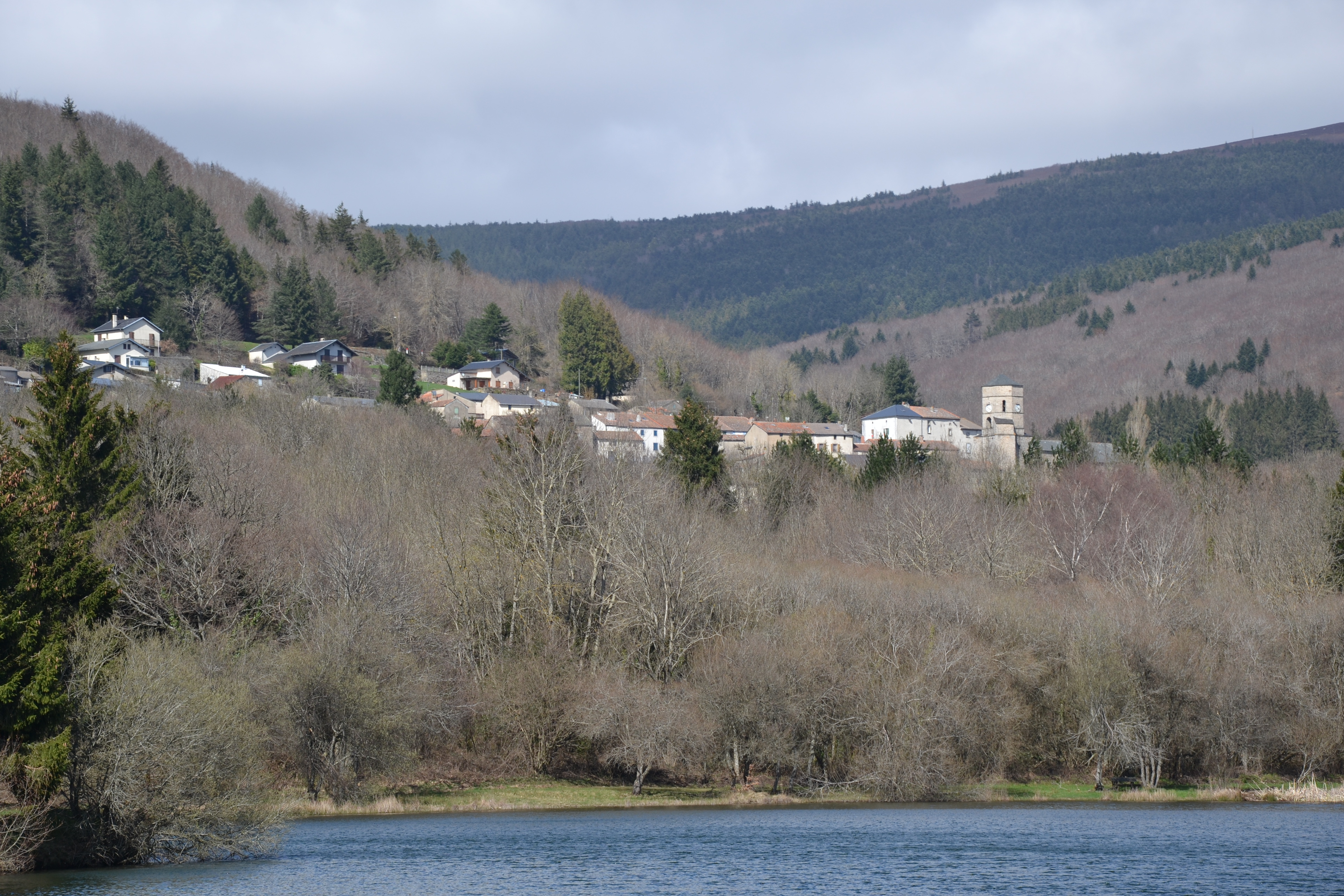
- A general view of Pradelles

- Coat of arms
- Location of Pradelles-Cabardès
- Location within France Location within Occitanie
- Coordinates: 43°24′34″N 2°26′50″E
- Country: France
- Region: Occitania
- Department: Aude
- Arrondissement: Carcassonne
- Canton: La Vallée de l'Orbiel

Government
  - Mayor (2020–2026): Éric Gros
- Area^{1}: 20.61 km^{2} (7.96 sq mi)
- Elevation: 850 m (2,790 ft)
- Highest elevation: 1,207 m (3,960 ft)
- Lowest elevation: 520 m (1,710 ft)
- Population (2023): 160
  - Density: 7.8/km^{2} (20/sq mi)
- Time zone: UTC+01:00 (CET)
  - Summer (DST): UTC+02:00 (CEST)
- INSEE/Postal code: 11297 /11380
- ^{1} French Land Register data, which excludes lakes, ponds, glaciers > 1 km^{2} (0.386 sq mi or 247 acres) and river estuaries.

Pradelles-Cabardès (French pronunciation: [pʁadɛl kabaʁdɛs]; Occitan: Pradèlas Cabardés) is a commune in the Aude department in southern France.

== Geography ==
It lies at the foot of the Pic de Nore.

There is a small reservoir, called Lac de Pradelles.

== Population ==
Historical population
Year	Pop.	±% p.a.
1968	223	—
1975	187	−2.48%
1982	183	−0.31%
1990	153	−2.21%
1999	160	+0.50%
2007	152	−0.64%
2012	151	−0.13%
2017	143	−1.08%
2023	160	+1.89%
Source: INSEE

== Economy ==
Historically, the village supplied blocks of ice to hotels before ice makers were available.

== See also ==
- Communes of the Aude department
