= Fournes-Cabardès =

Commune in Occitanie, France

- Commune
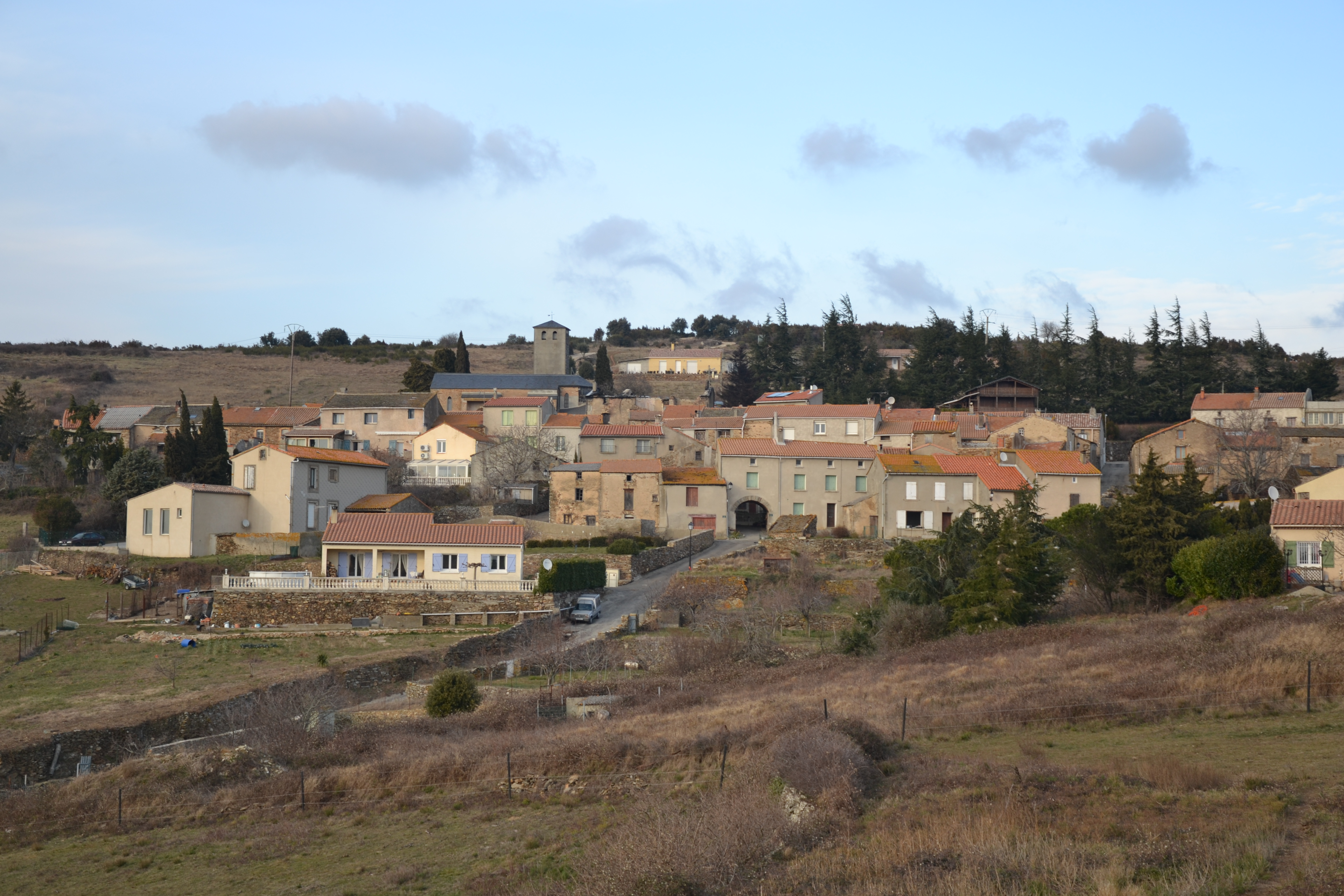
- A general view of Fournes

- Coat of arms
- Location of Fournes-Cabardès
- Location within France Location within Occitanie
- Coordinates: 43°20′59″N 2°23′54″E
- Country: France
- Region: Occitania
- Department: Aude
- Arrondissement: Carcassonne
- Canton: La Vallée de l'Orbiel

Government
  - Mayor (2020–2026): Guy Chiffre
- Area^{1}: 12.45 km^{2} (4.81 sq mi)
- Elevation: 560 m (1,840 ft)
- Highest elevation: 851 m (2,792 ft)
- Lowest elevation: 217 m (712 ft)
- Population (2023): 53
  - Density: 4.3/km^{2} (11/sq mi)
- Time zone: UTC+01:00 (CET)
  - Summer (DST): UTC+02:00 (CEST)
- INSEE/Postal code: 11154 /11600
- ^{1} French Land Register data, which excludes lakes, ponds, glaciers > 1 km^{2} (0.386 sq mi or 247 acres) and river estuaries.

Fournes-Cabardès (French pronunciation: [fuʁn kabaʁdɛs]; Occitan: Fornas) is a commune in the Aude department in the Occitanie region in southern France.

== Population ==
Historical population
Year	Pop.	±% p.a.
1968	74	—
1975	64	−2.05%
1982	70	+1.29%
1990	61	−1.71%
1999	49	−2.40%
2007	64	+3.39%
2012	56	−2.64%
2017	50	−2.24%
2023	53	+0.98%
Source: INSEE

Its inhabitants are known as Fournois in French.

== See also ==
- Communes of the Aude department
