= Fournès =

- Commune
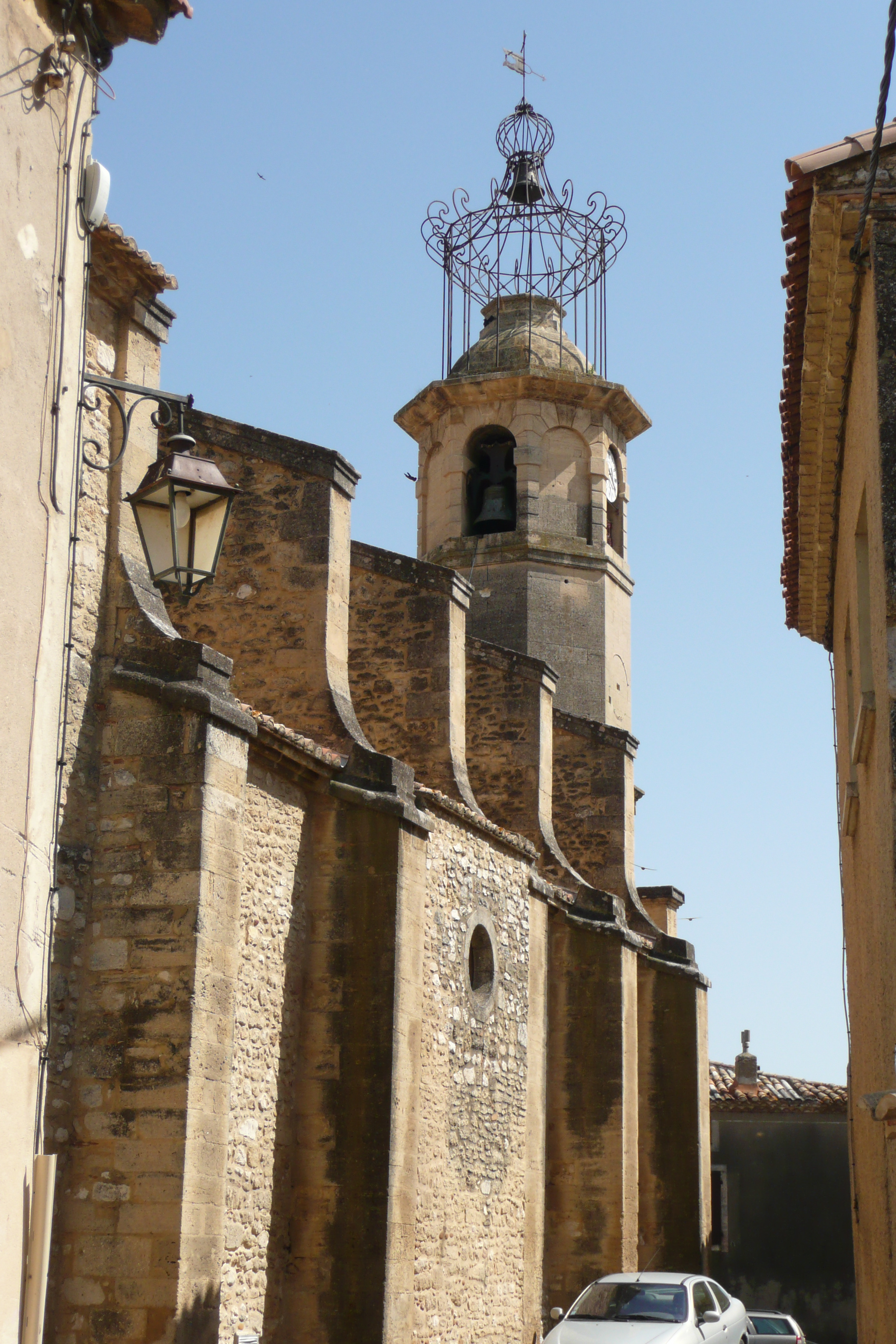
- The church of Fournès

- Coat of arms
- Location of Fournès
- Location within France Location within Occitanie
- Coordinates: 43°55′46″N 4°36′06″E
- Country: France
- Region: Occitania
- Department: Gard
- Arrondissement: Nîmes
- Canton: Redessan
- Intercommunality: Pont du Gard

Government
  - Mayor (2020–2026): Thierry Boudinaud
- Area^{1}: 17.66 km^{2} (6.82 sq mi)
- Elevation: 35 m (115 ft)
- Highest elevation: 172 m (564 ft)
- Lowest elevation: 7 m (23 ft)
- Population (2023): 1,047
  - Density: 59.29/km^{2} (153.6/sq mi)
- Time zone: UTC+01:00 (CET)
  - Summer (DST): UTC+02:00 (CEST)
- INSEE/Postal code: 30116 /30210
- ^{1} French Land Register data, which excludes lakes, ponds, glaciers > 1 km^{2} (0.386 sq mi or 247 acres) and river estuaries.

Fournès (French pronunciation: [fuʁnɛs]; Occitan: Fornés) is a commune in the southern French department of Gard.

== Population ==
Historical population
Year	Pop.	±% p.a.
1968	428	—
1975	465	+1.19%
1982	514	+1.44%
1990	590	+1.74%
1999	738	+2.52%
2007	891	+2.38%
2012	914	+0.51%
2017	1,085	+3.49%
2023	1,047	−0.59%
Source: INSEE

== See also ==
- Communes of the Gard department
