= Electro-diesel multiple unit =

Hybrid overhead line-/fossil fuel engine-powered passenger train

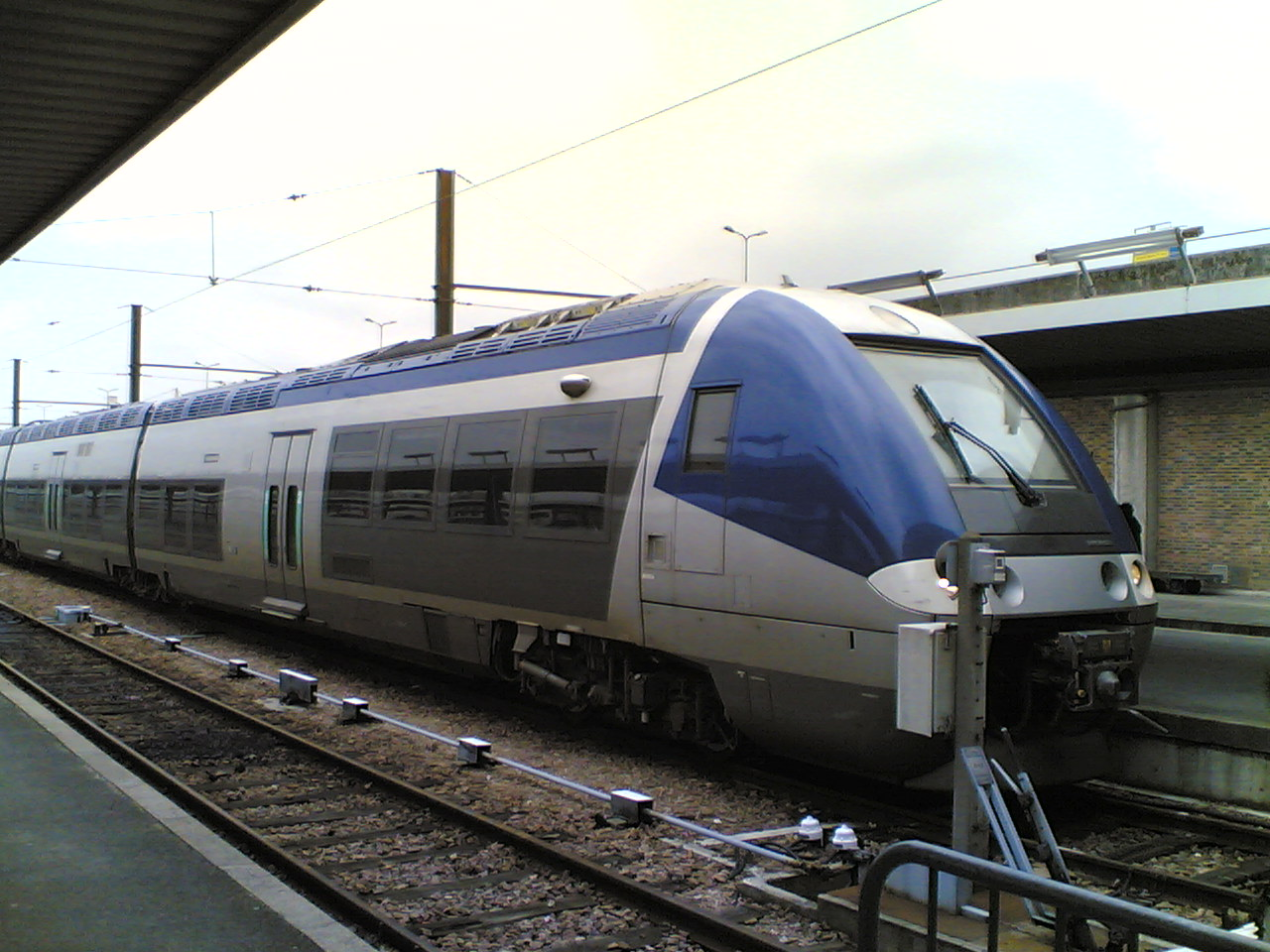
SNCF Class B 81500, an example of an electro-diesel multiple unit

An electro-diesel multiple unit (EDMU) or bi-mode multiple unit (BMU) is a form of a multiple unit train that can be powered either by electric power picked up from the overhead lines or third rail (like an electric multiple unit – EMU) or by using an onboard diesel engine, driving an electric generator, which produces alternating current (AC) or direct current (DC) electric power (like a diesel-electric multiple unit – DEMU).

== List of EDMUs ==
=== Asia ===
==== China ====
China Railway CR200J-SG Fuxing high-speed train is a power-concentrated electro-diesel (bi-mode) multiple unit specifically designed for plateau operation. Each train consists of HXD1D-J electric locomotive (power car) at one end, FXN3-J two-unit diesel locomotive (two power cars) at another end, and 9 25-T passenger coaches between them. Electric and diesel power cars have their own independent traction motor systems, but can be operated from cabs of each other. HXD1D-J is a special version of HXD1D electric locomotive manufactured by CRRC Zhuzhou Locomotive and FXN3-J is a special version of a FXN3 locomotive manufactured by CRRC Dalian – both of them have changed body design and are adapted for joint operation as part of a train. These trains are served on Sichuan–Tibet railway.

=== Oceania ===
==== Australia ====
NSW TrainLink Regional Train Project has placed an order for 117 bi-mode R set carriages (1.5 kV DC) to replace its diesel fleet of interstate and regional XPT, Xplorer and Endeavour trainsets to be delivered from Spain by CAF, starting in 2023.

=== Europe ===
==== France ====
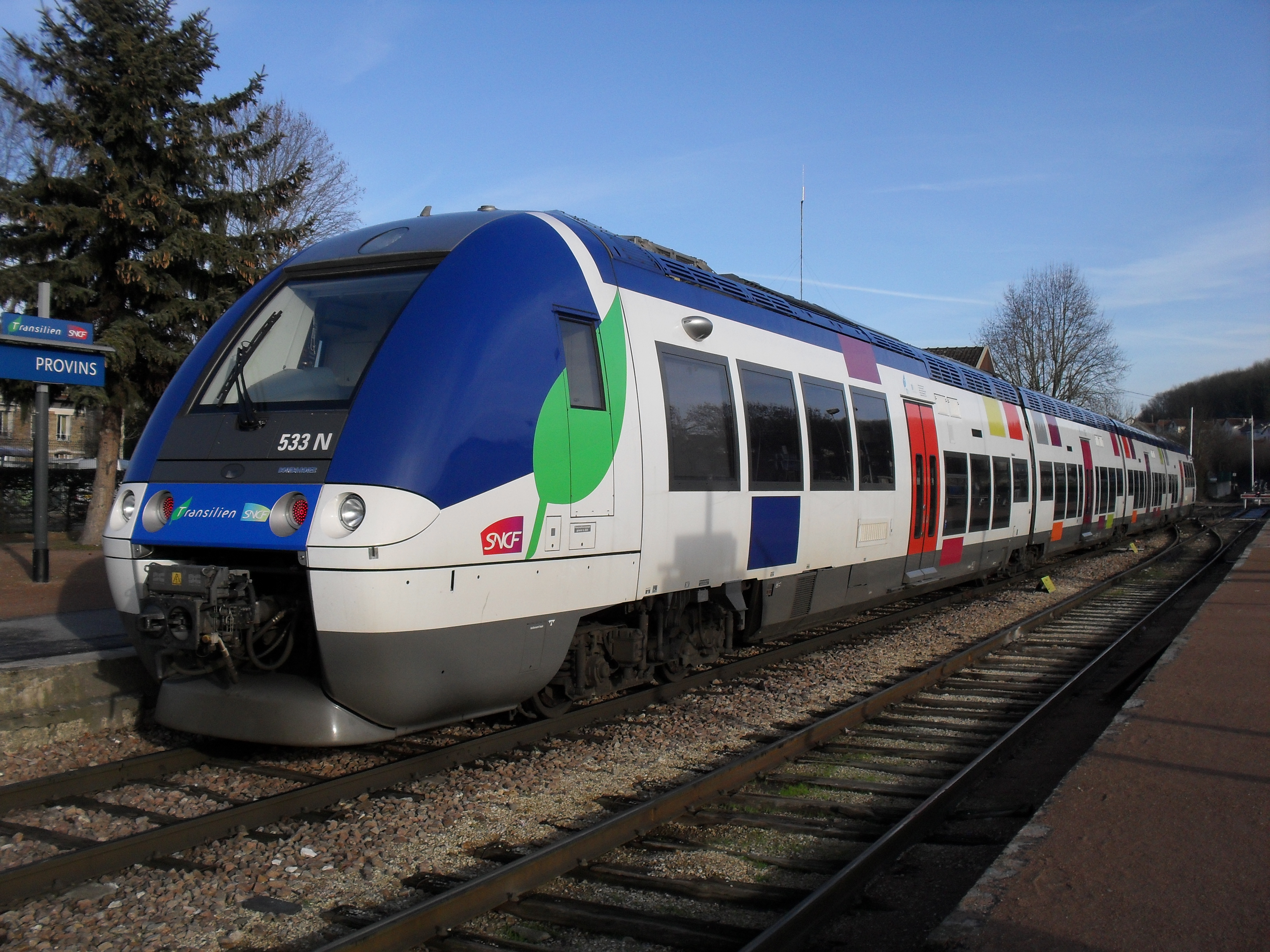
SNCF B 82500 BMU

Bombardier has built dual-mode variants of its AGC series for the French operator SNCF; the electricity is collected by means of a pantograph.

- B 81500 – multiple unit trains using 1.5 kV DC catenary. In service since 2005.
- B 82500 – multiple unit trains using both 1.5 kV DC and 25 kV AC catenary. In service since October 2007.
- Alstom Régiolis (B 83500, B 84500, B 85000, B 85900). In service since April 2014 (B 83500 and B 84500).

==== Italy ====
- BTR 813, first electro-diesel version of the Stadler Flirt, service in the Valle d'Aosta region since October 2019.

==== Netherlands ====
- 18 bi-mode units of the Stadler WINK have entered service in 2021 with Arriva Netherlands. In addition to electric and diesel propulsion, these trains can also run on battery power.

==== Sweden ====
- 8 units of a bi-modal variant of the CAF Civity Nordic, called BIR 1 in Sweden have ben ordered by the train leasing company Transito. All trains should be delivered by 2028 and will be operated under the regional brand Krösatågen.

==== Norway ====
- 14 bi-modal variants of the Stadler Flirt trains, called Norske Tog Class 76 in Norway, held by the state owned Norske Tog and operated by the line operator SJ AB (as SJ Nord) entering service in 2021. This class is used on the regional train services around Trondheim.

==== Poland ====
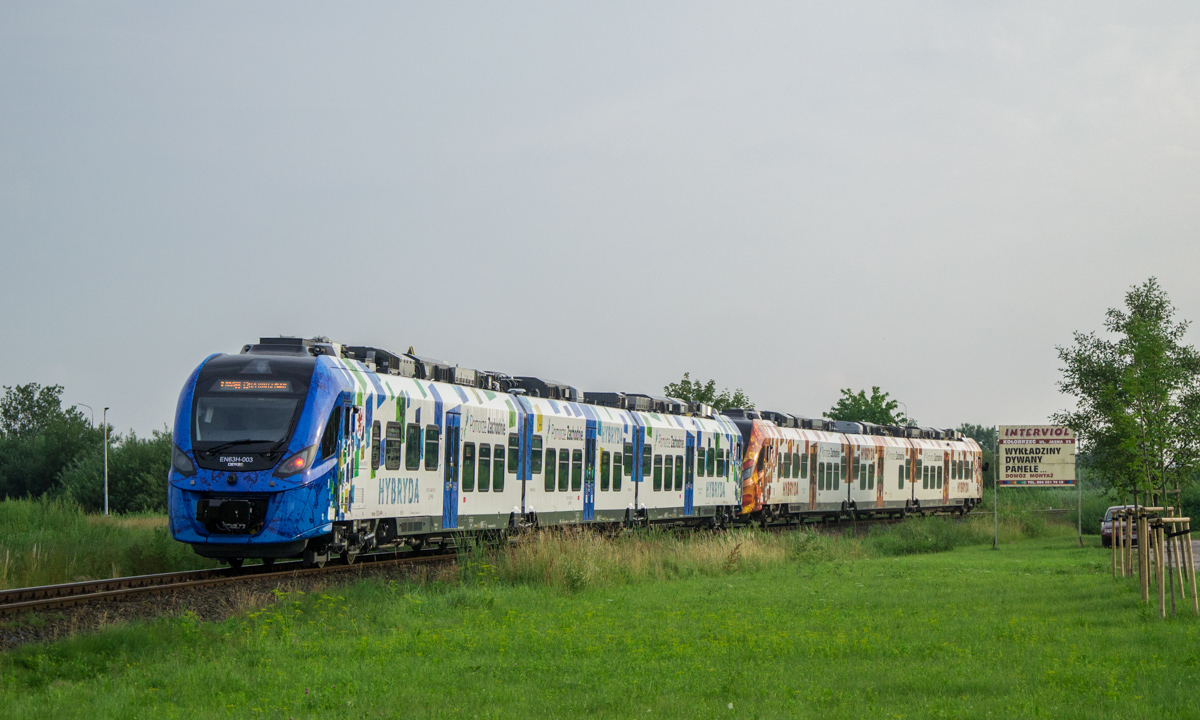
EN63H West Pomerian Voivodeship operated by Polregio

- Newag Impuls is offered in electro-diesel (hybrid) version. The first units were delivered to West Pomeranian Voivodeship and started regular revenue service in early 2021.

==== Russia ====
- DT1 (ДТ1) Russian-gauge multiple unit. In service since 2009.

==== Spain ====
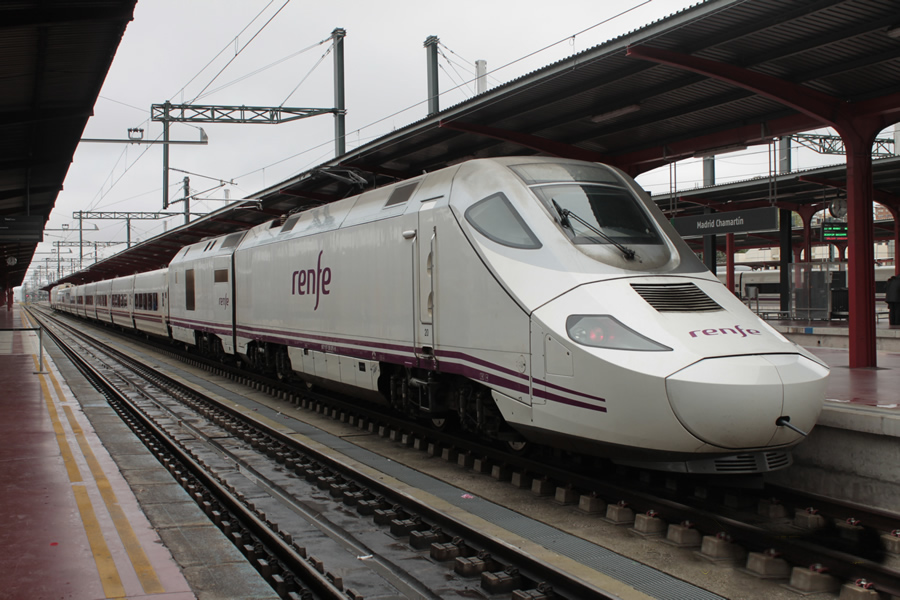
Renfe Class 730

Renfe Class 730 – a bi-mode subversion of Renfe Class 130, a dual-gauge, dual-voltage high-speed power-concentrated electric multiple unit, a part of Talgo 250 family. In 2012, 15 original Class 130 trainsets were modified to Class 730 by replacing their end passenger coaches with diesel-generator cars. Each train consists of 13 cars, including 2 electric locomotive-like power cars, 2 diesel-generator cars and 9 passenger coaches. One train crashed in 2013, another 14 are still in use on Alvia services.

==== United Kingdom ====
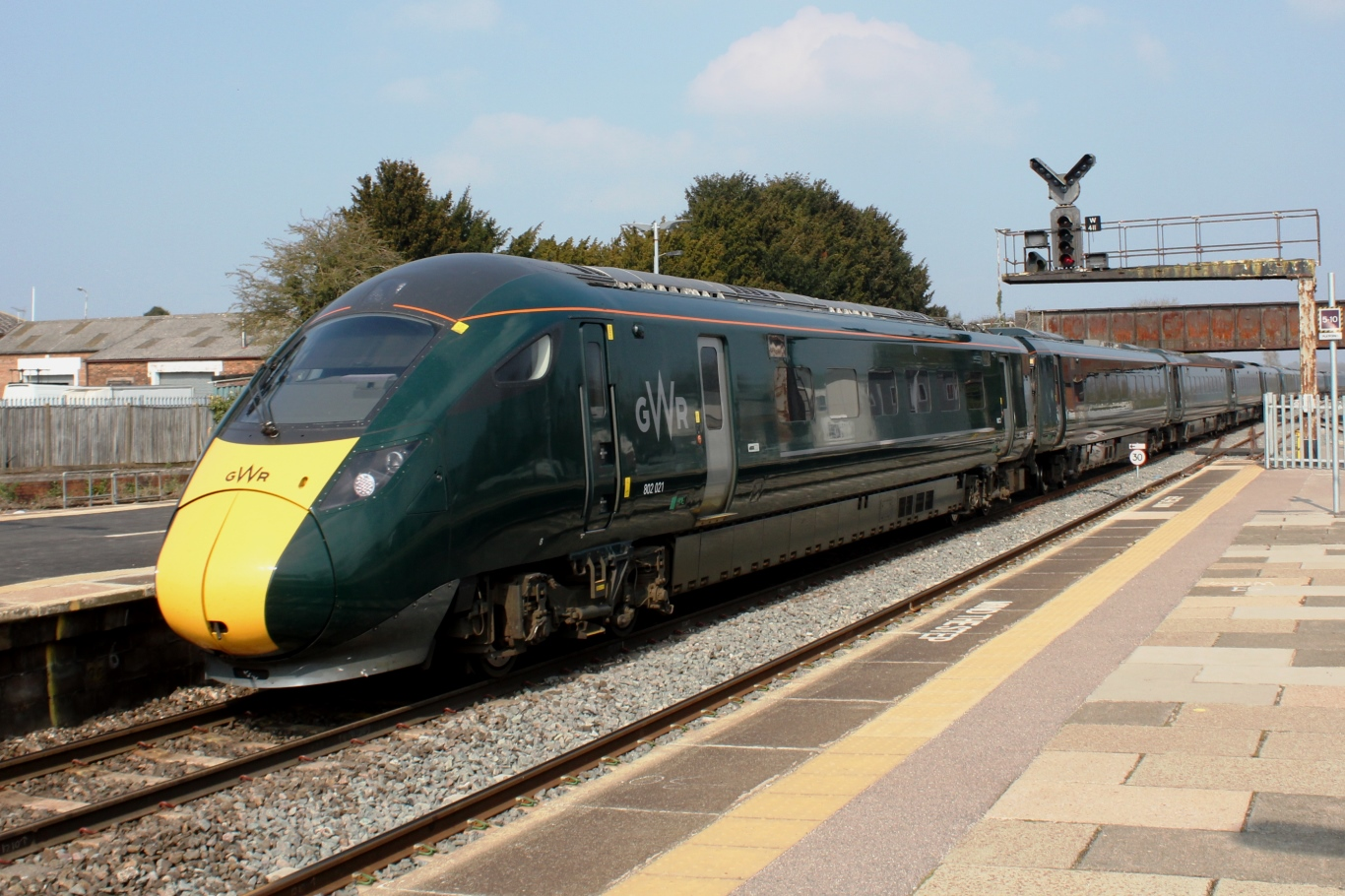
British Rail Class 802

Electro-diesel multiple units whose electricity source is 25 kV 50 Hz AC overhead line include:

- Hitachi-built British Rail Class 800, Class 802, Class 805 and Class 810 – high-speed multiple unit used by multiple train operating companies
- British Rail Class 768 – multiple unit converted from Class 319 (with external dual-system/voltage support), for use by Rail Operations Group on parcel services.
- British Rail Class 769 – multiple unit converted from Class 319 (with external dual-system/voltage support), for use on, Northern and Transport for Wales regional services. In service since November 2019.
- Stadler-built British Rail Class 755 – multiple unit for use on Greater Anglia regional services. In service since July 2019 (755/4). Also, the Stadler-built British Rail Class 231 for Transport for Wales.

=== North America ===
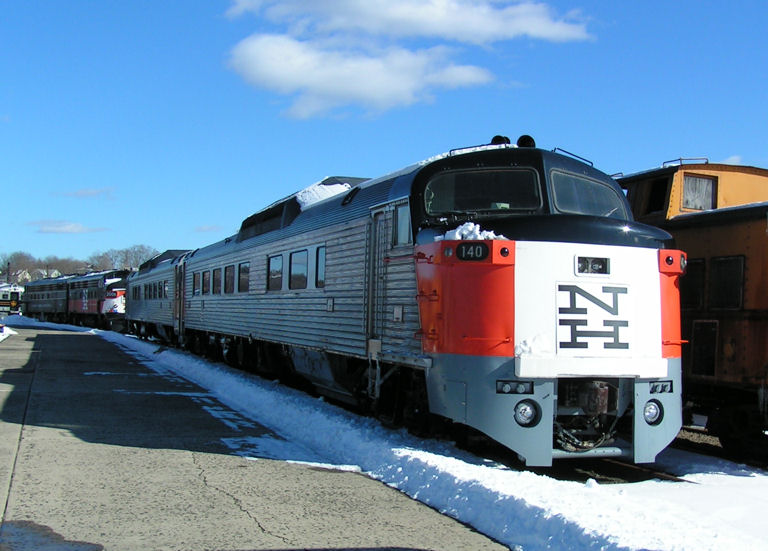
New Haven #140 "Roger Williams", unique Budd railcar-based train at Danbury Railway Museum, Connecticut

==== United States ====
The following were retired from New York City service:

- "Roger Williams" – streamlined 6-car lightweight DMU passenger train, built by Budd Company in 1956 for New York, New Haven and Hartford Railroad; primarily diesel-hydraulic, third-rail electric mode for short-term use only. Three cars preserved.
- GE/Garrett gas turbine MUs – primarily electric, but built with gas turbines to allow operation outside of third rail electrification. All scrapped.
- United Aircraft Corporation TurboTrain - Streamlined gas turbine trains built for the New Haven (later Penn Central and Amtrak) and Canadian National (later VIA) railways. US examples built with third rail shoes to allow access to Grand Central Terminal.

==== Mexico ====
- X'Trapolis Tsíimin K'áak – 42 trains ordered for Tren Maya, 32 of which are EDMU

== See also ==
- Electro-diesel locomotive
