= SNCF Class Z 27500 =

French electric multiple unit trainset

Z 27500 (ZGC)
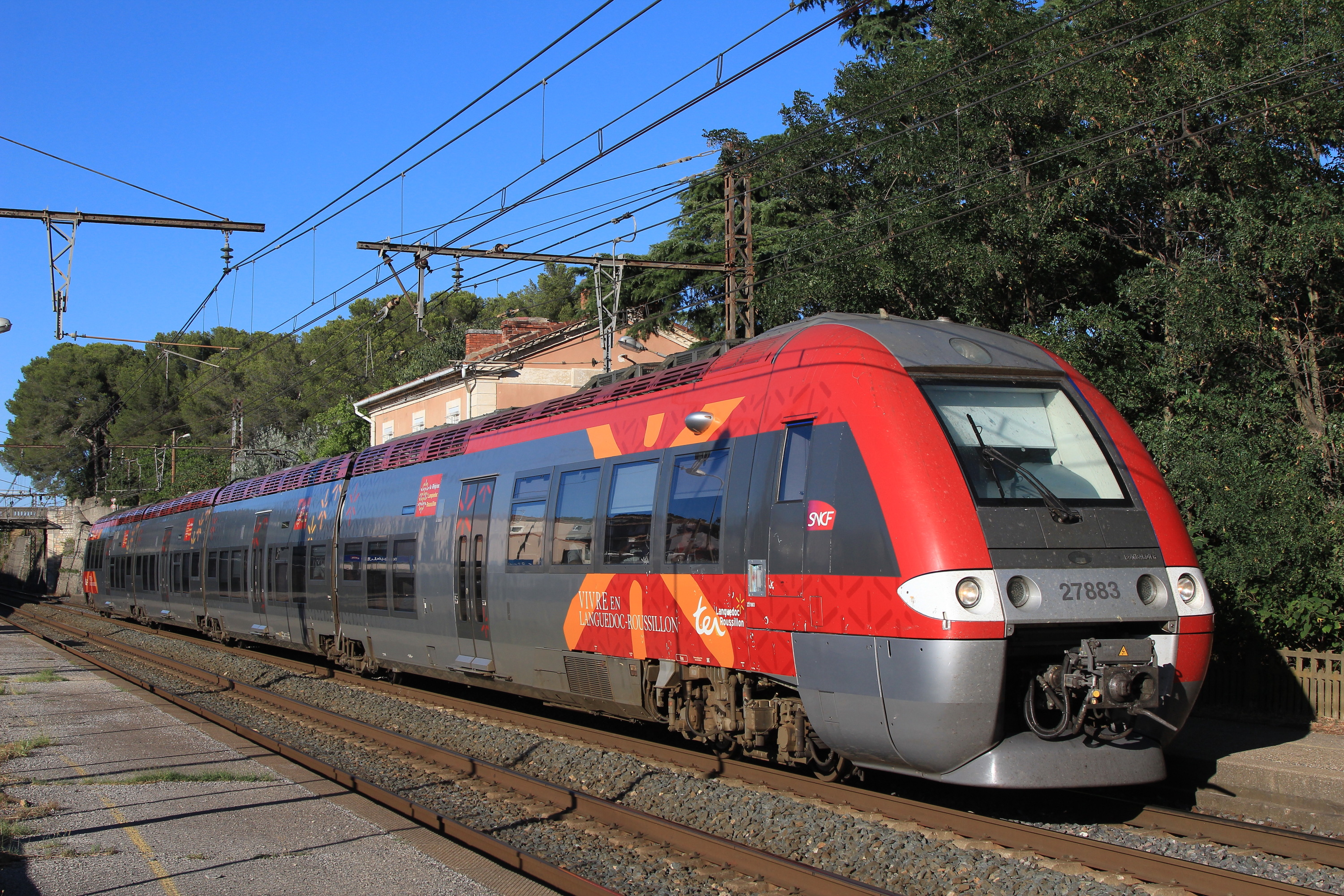
- Z 27883 in the TER Languedoc-Roussillon livery at Milhaud station
- In service: 2005–present
- Manufacturer: Bombardier Transportation
- Built at: Crespin
- Family name: Autorail à Grande Capacité
- Replaced: Z2 (Z 7300, Z 7500, Z 9500, Z 9600, Z 11500) and RIO, RRR cars
- Constructed: 2005–2010
- Entered service: 2005
- Number built: 211
- Number in service: 211 trainsets (As of December 2013)
- Formation: 3 or 4 cars per trainset articulated (M1+R1(+R2)+M2)
- Fleet numbers: Z 27501/2–27949/50
- Capacity: 140 + 20 folding seats†; 194 + 26 folding seats*
- Operators: SNCF
- Lines served: TER

Specifications
- Train length: 57.4 m (188 ft 4 in)†; 72.8 m (238 ft 10 in)*
- Car length: 21 m (68 ft 11 in) (end car); 15.4 m (50 ft 6 in) (intermediate cars)
- Width: 2.95 m (9 ft 8 in)
- Height: 4.02 m (13 ft 2 in)
- Wheel diameter: 840 mm (33 in)
- Wheelbase: 2,700 mm (110 in) (motorised bogie); 2,800 mm (110 in) (trailer bogie)
- Maximum speed: 160 km/h (99 mph)
- Weight: 124.7 t (122.7 long tons; 137.5 short tons)†; 152.6 t (150.2 long tons; 168.2 short tons)*
- Traction system: Bombardier MITRAC IGBT–VVVF
- Traction motors: 4 × 325 kW (436 hp) 3-phase AC induction motor
- Power output: 1,300 kW (1,700 hp)
- Transmission: 4.68 : 1 gear ratio (2-stage reduction)
- Electric system(s): Overhead line: 25 kV 50 Hz AC; 1,500 V DC
- Current collection: Pantograph
- UIC classification: Bo′+2′(+2′)+2′+Bo′
- Safety system(s): Crocodile and KVB
- Coupling system: Scharfenberg type, from Dellner
- Multiple working: Z 27500, B 81500, B 82500
- Track gauge: 1,435 mm (4 ft 8 1/2 in) standard gauge

Notes/references
- † 3 car train, * 4 car train.

The Z 27500 is a type of dual-voltage electric multiple unit trainset for the French National Railway Company (SNCF) intended to the TER network (French commuter rail).

The train is the electric variant of Bombardier AGC, often referred to as ZGC. It the most important fleet of all other AGC variants. It is capable of operating on a 1,500 V DC or 25 kV 50 Hz AC electricity supply.

A total of 211 trainsets have been built by Canadian conglomerate Bombardier at its factory in Crespin (near Valenciennes, France) since 2005. The first set (Z 27503/27504) was placed into regular passenger service on 24 March 2005, for the Basse-Normandie region.

== Design ==
Bombardier vehicle design is articulated using bogies between carriages. The Z 27500 are available in three or four-car unit. The train can be operated as a multiple-unit control with up to three units, with other Z 27500 or the dual-mode version Diesel/1,500 V DC (B 81500). The train is equipped with 2 pantographs on the intermediate car.

Their capacity offers 160 seats in a three-car unit, 220 in a four-car set. The inter-carriage passages have wide, open gangway connections, limiting bottlenecking.

The Z 27500 from Lorraine region can be operated as a multiple-unit control with the Diesel variant (X 76500), specifically equipped with a command to raise the pantograph.

Whereas the first trains were delivered in their three-car set version (with an intermediate car), several regions later added a second intermediate car, in order to increase their capacity from 160 to 220 seats.

== Photo gallery ==
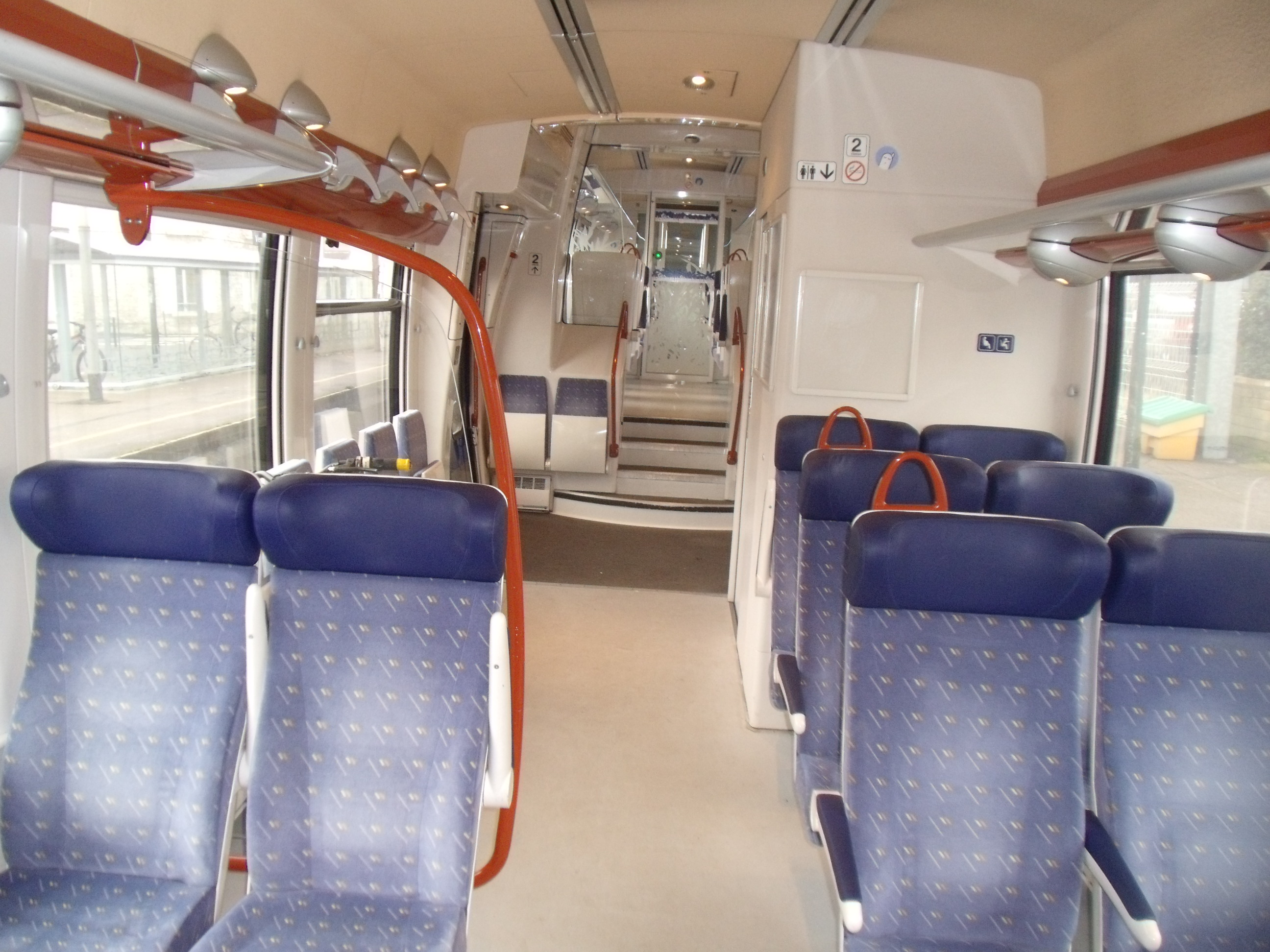
Interior, show 2+2 seatings (second class)

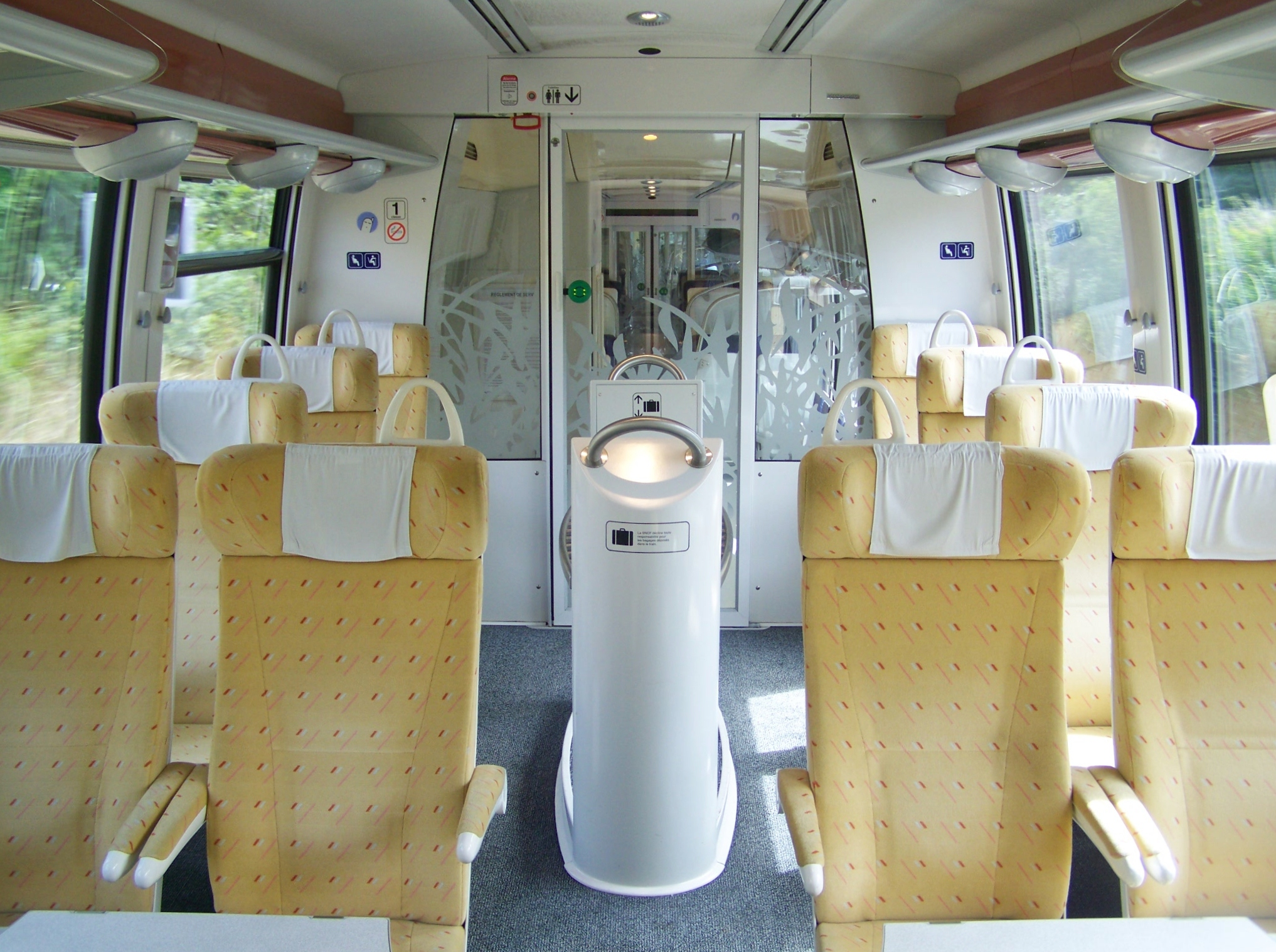
First class interior

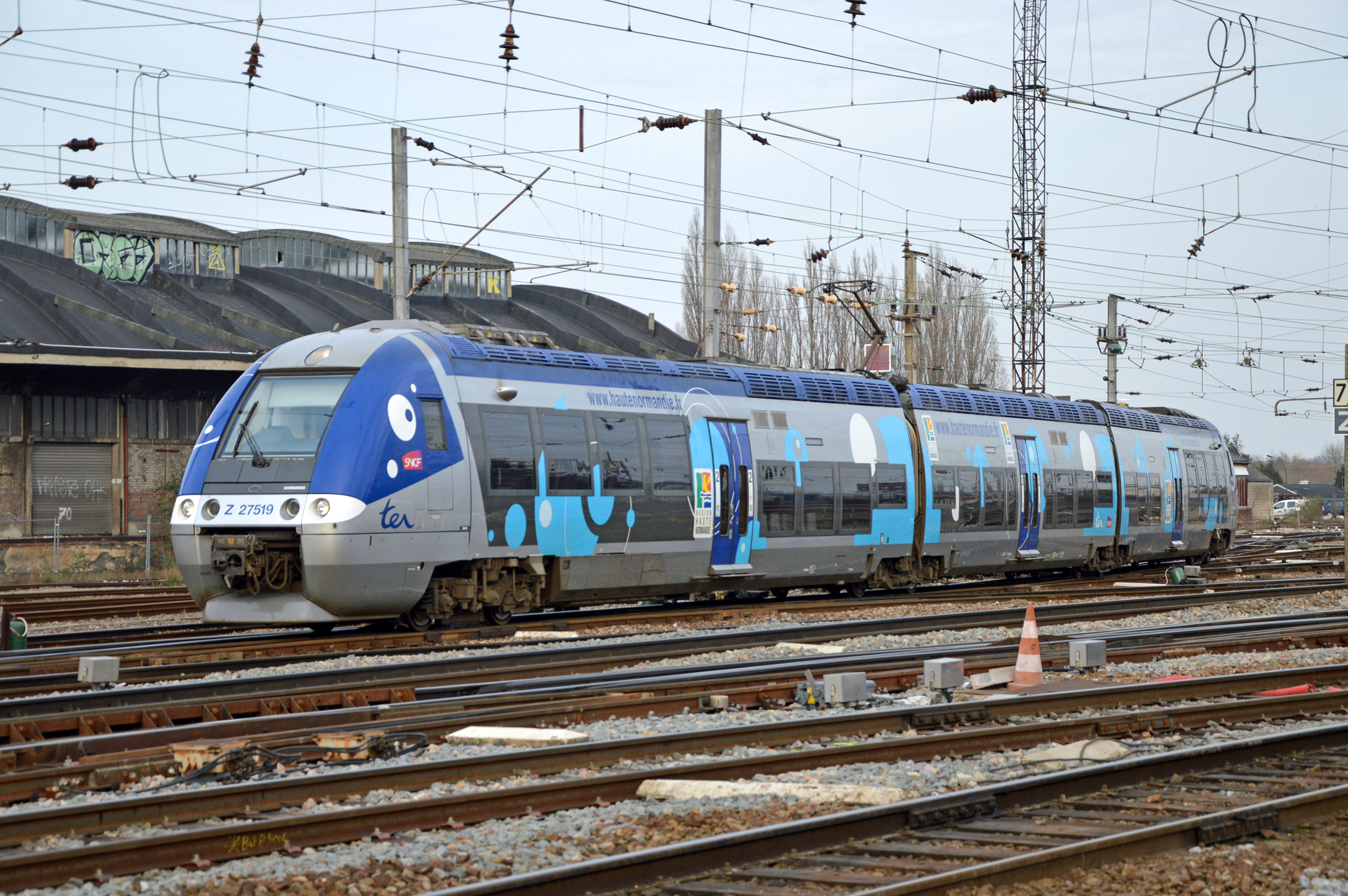
Z 27500 in its three-car set version

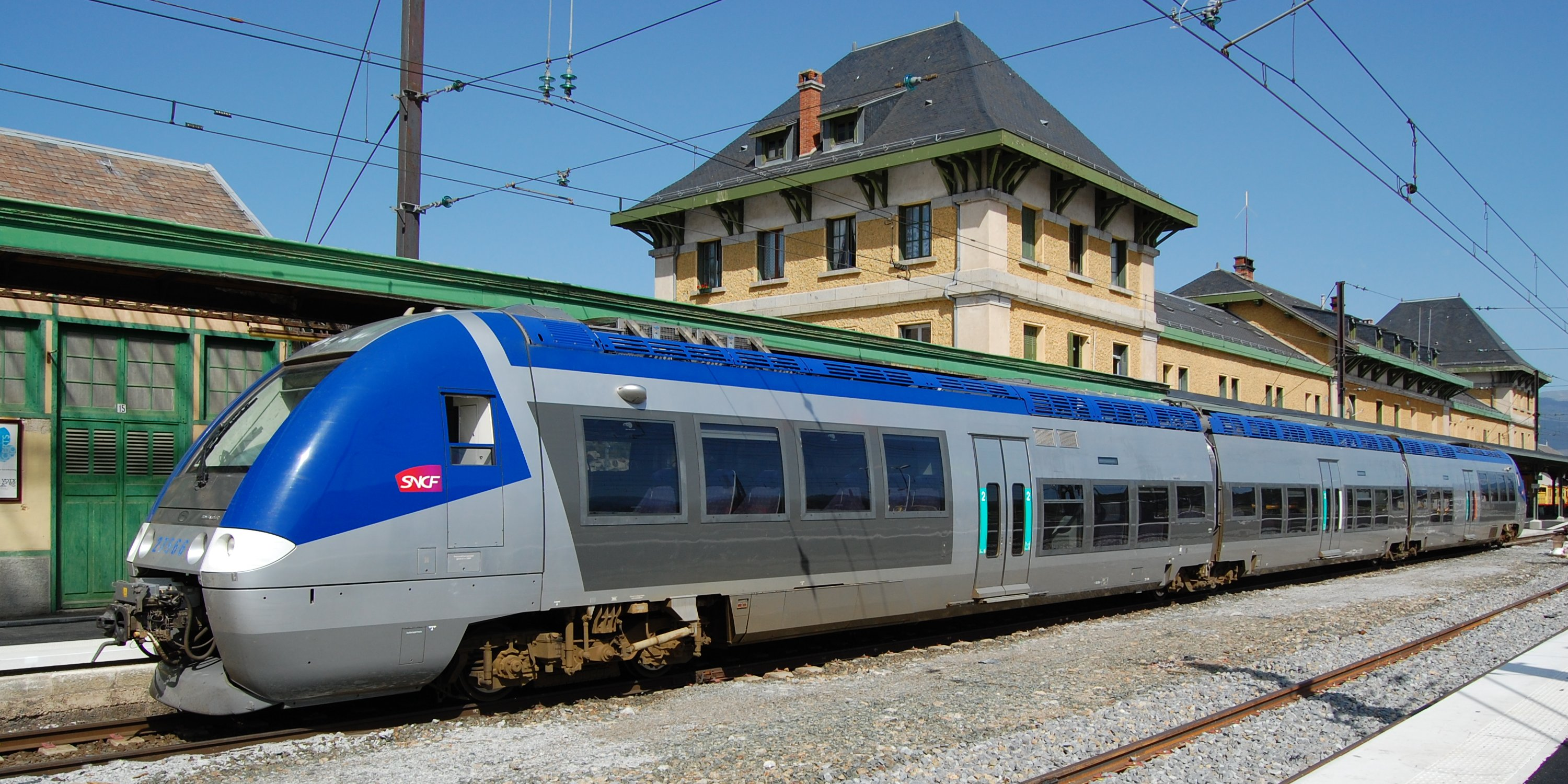
Another three-car set of Z 27500

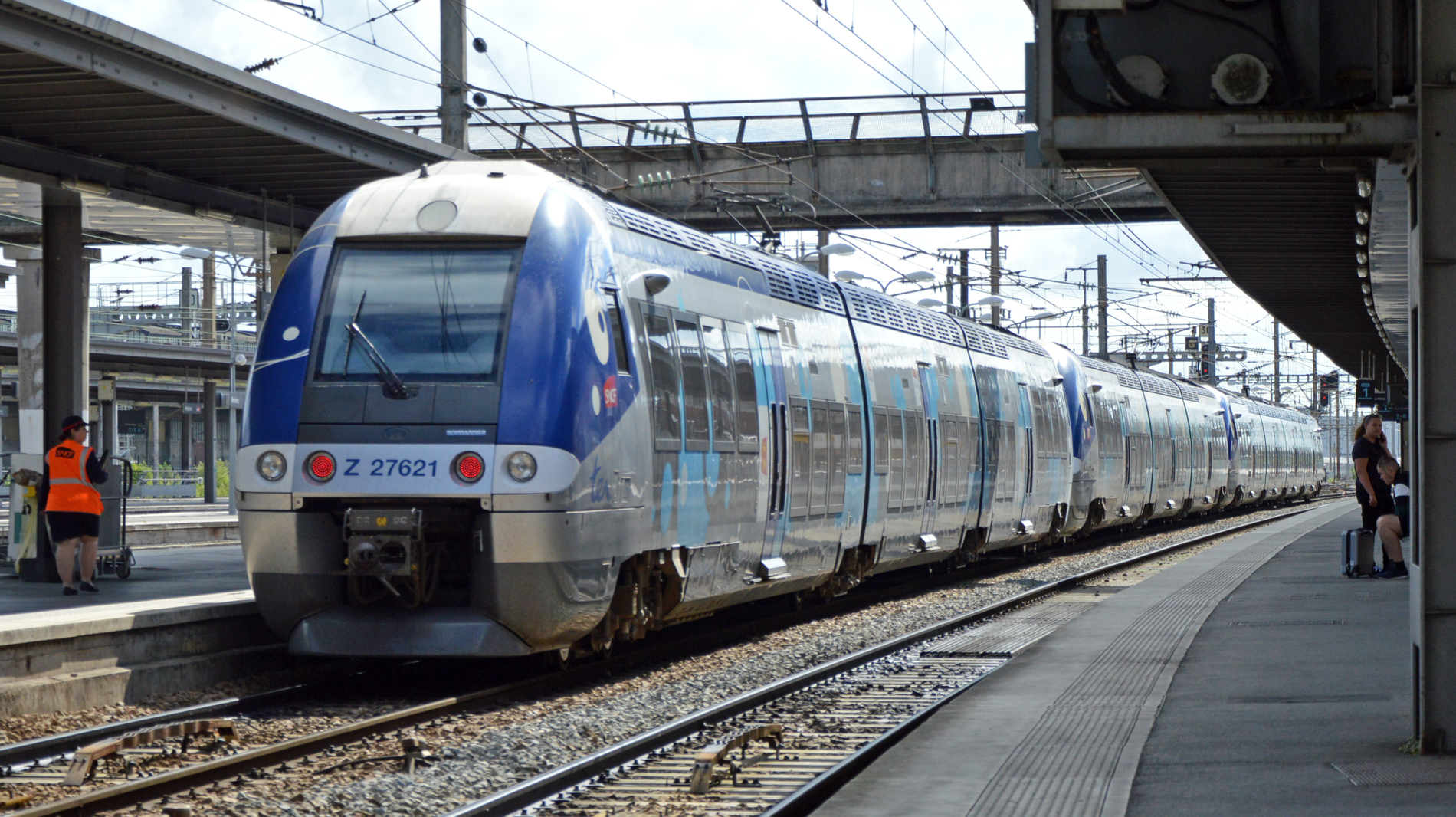
Two Z 27500 and one B 82500 being coupled for multiple working

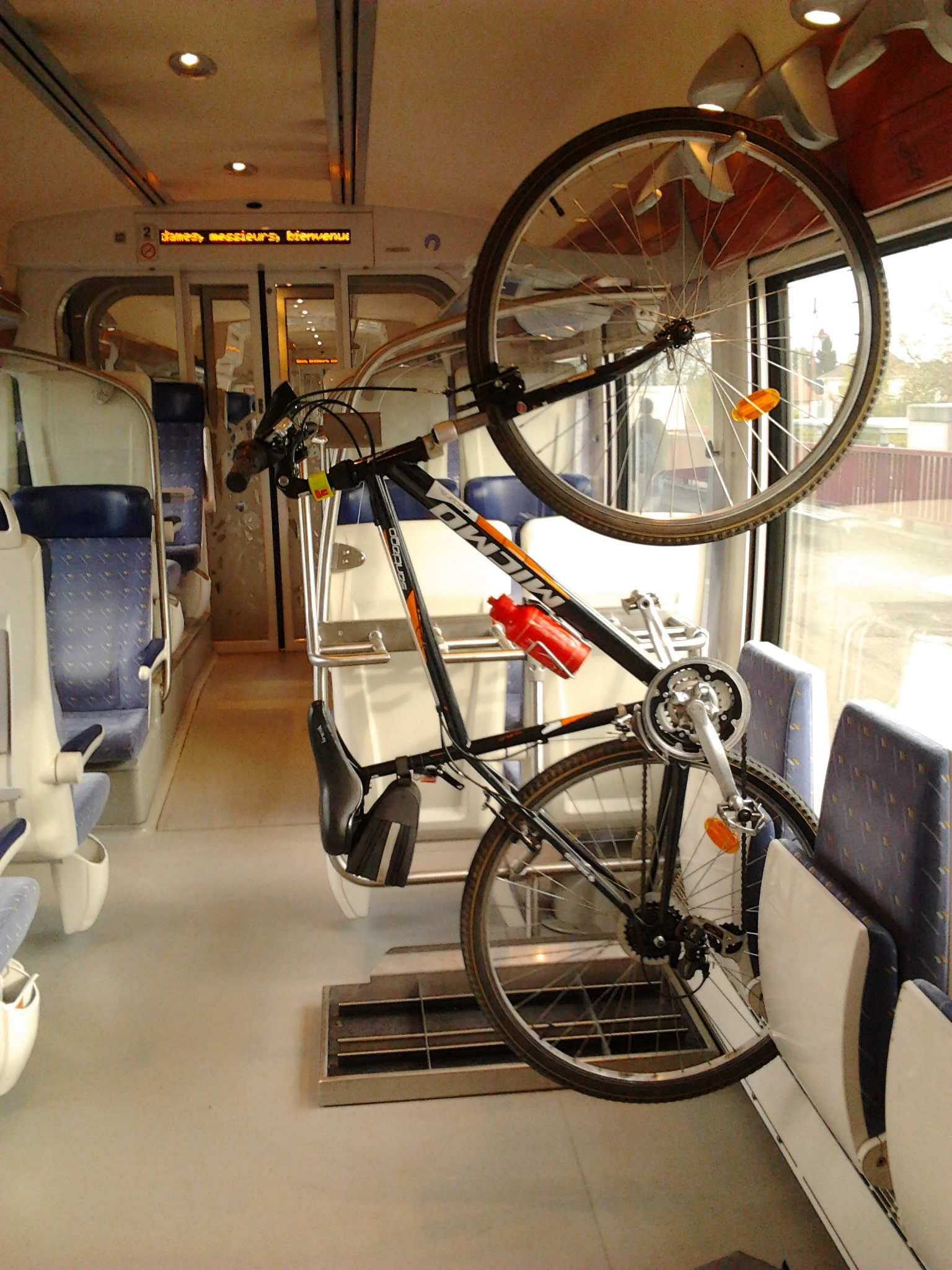
Bikes storage space on the train

== Operators and routes ==
=== TER Auvergne-Rhône-Alpes ===
- Ambérieu-en-Bugey - Bourg-en-Bresse - Mâcon
- Annecy - La-Roche-sur-Foron - Annemasse
- Annecy - La-Roche-sur-Foron - Cluses - Saint-Gervais-les-Bains
- Annemasse - Thonon-les-Bains - Évian-les-Bains
- Annemasse - La Roche-sur-Foron - Bonneville - Cluses - Sallanches-Combloux-Megève - Saint-Gervais-les-Bains-Le Fayet
- Annecy - Grenoble - Valence
- Valence - Grenoble - Annecy -Thonon-les-Bains - Évian-les-Bains
- Lyon Perrache - Lyon Part-Dieu - Bourg-en-Bresse
- Lyon Part-Dieu - Culoz - Aix-les-Bains-Le Revard - Annecy
- Lyon Part-Dieu - Culoz - Bellegarde - Genève-Cornavin
- Lyon Part-Dieu - Culoz - Bellegarde - Annemasse - Thonon-les-Bains - Évian-les-Bains
- Lyon Part-Dieu - Culoz - Bellegarde - Annemasse - La Roche-sur-Foron - Bonneville - Cluses - Sallanches-Combloux-Megève - Saint-Gervais-les-Bains-Le Fayet

=== TER Bourgogne-Franche-Comté ===
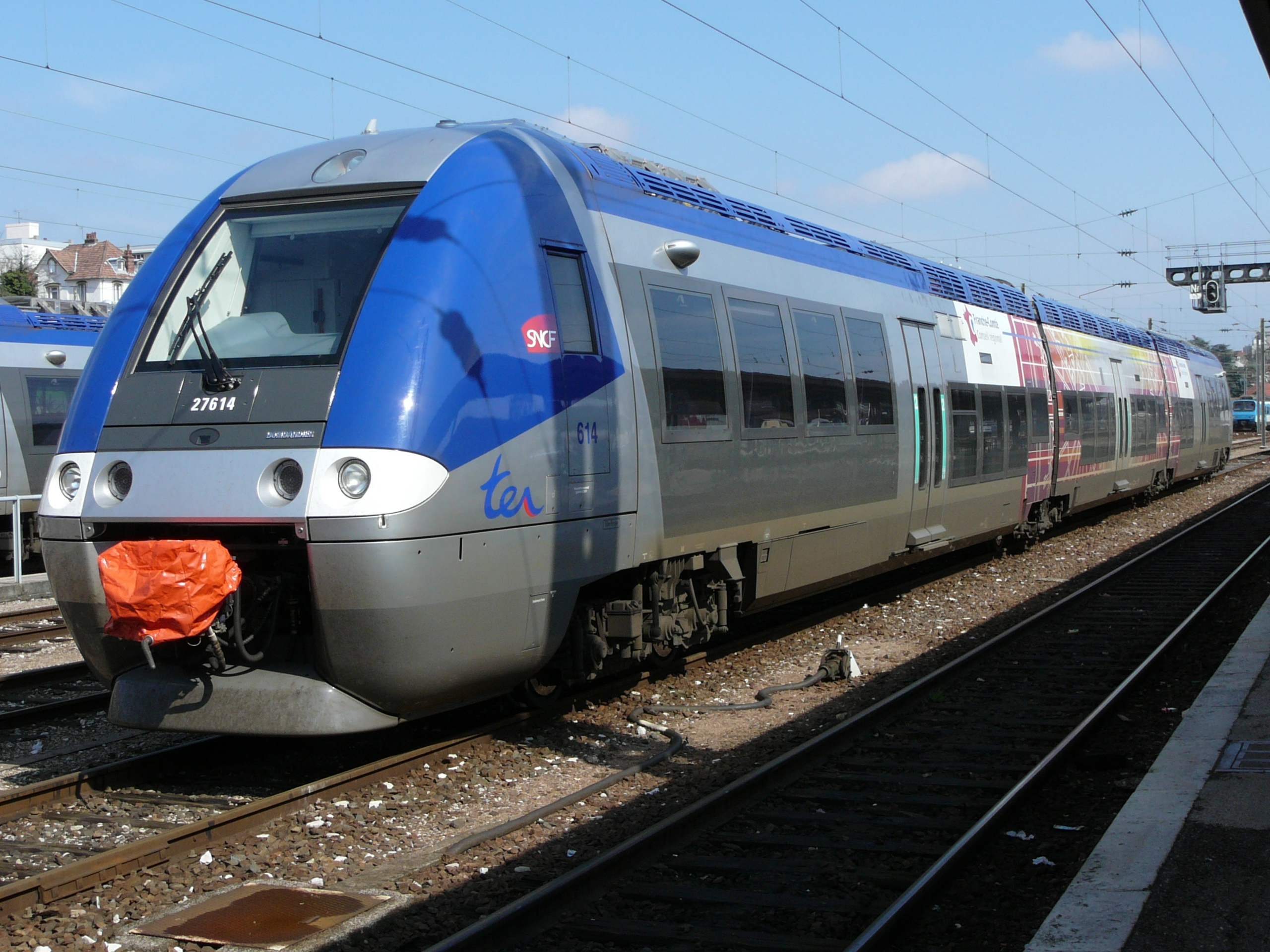
Franche-Comté ZGC stopped at the Besançon station.

- Moulins-sur-Allier - Nevers
- Dijon - Laroche - Migennes
- Dijon - Mâcon - Lyon
- Dijon - Besançon - Belfort
- Dijon - Dole - Pontarlier
- Besançon - Mouchard - Lons-le-Saunier
- Lyon - Lons-le-Saunier - Besançon - Belfort
- Belfort - Meroux - Delle

=== TER Bretagne ===
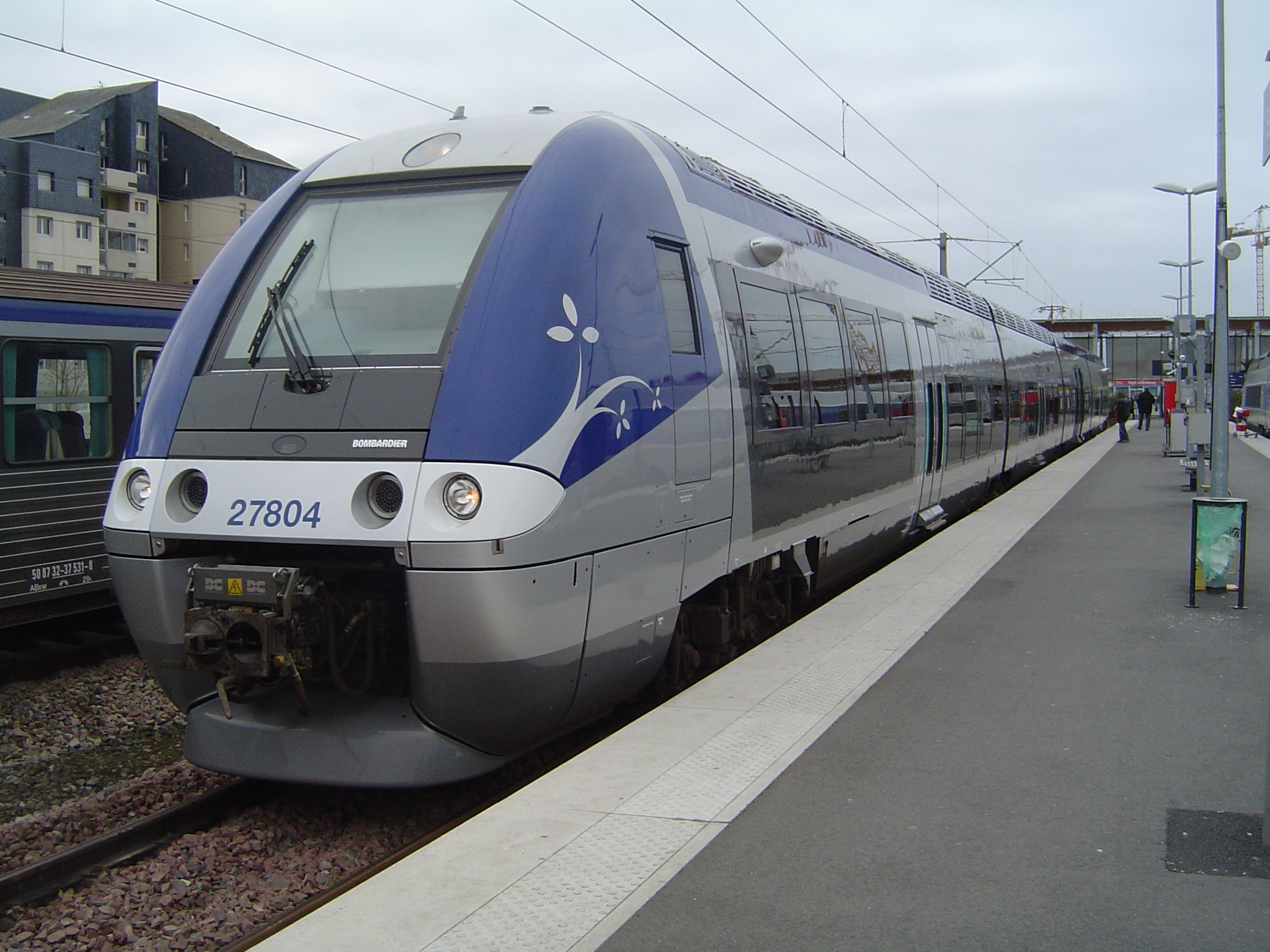
ZGC TER Bretagne at the Saint-Malo station.

- Brest - Morlaix
- Brest - Landerneau
- Rennes - Nantes
- Rennes - Saint-Malo
- Rennes - Saint-Brieuc
- Rennes - Redon
- Redon - Vannes - Lorient

=== TER Centre-Val de Loire ===
- Tours - Bourges
- Tours - Blois - Orléans
- Tours - Saumur
- Tours - Poitiers
- Orléans - Nevers

=== TER Grand Est ===
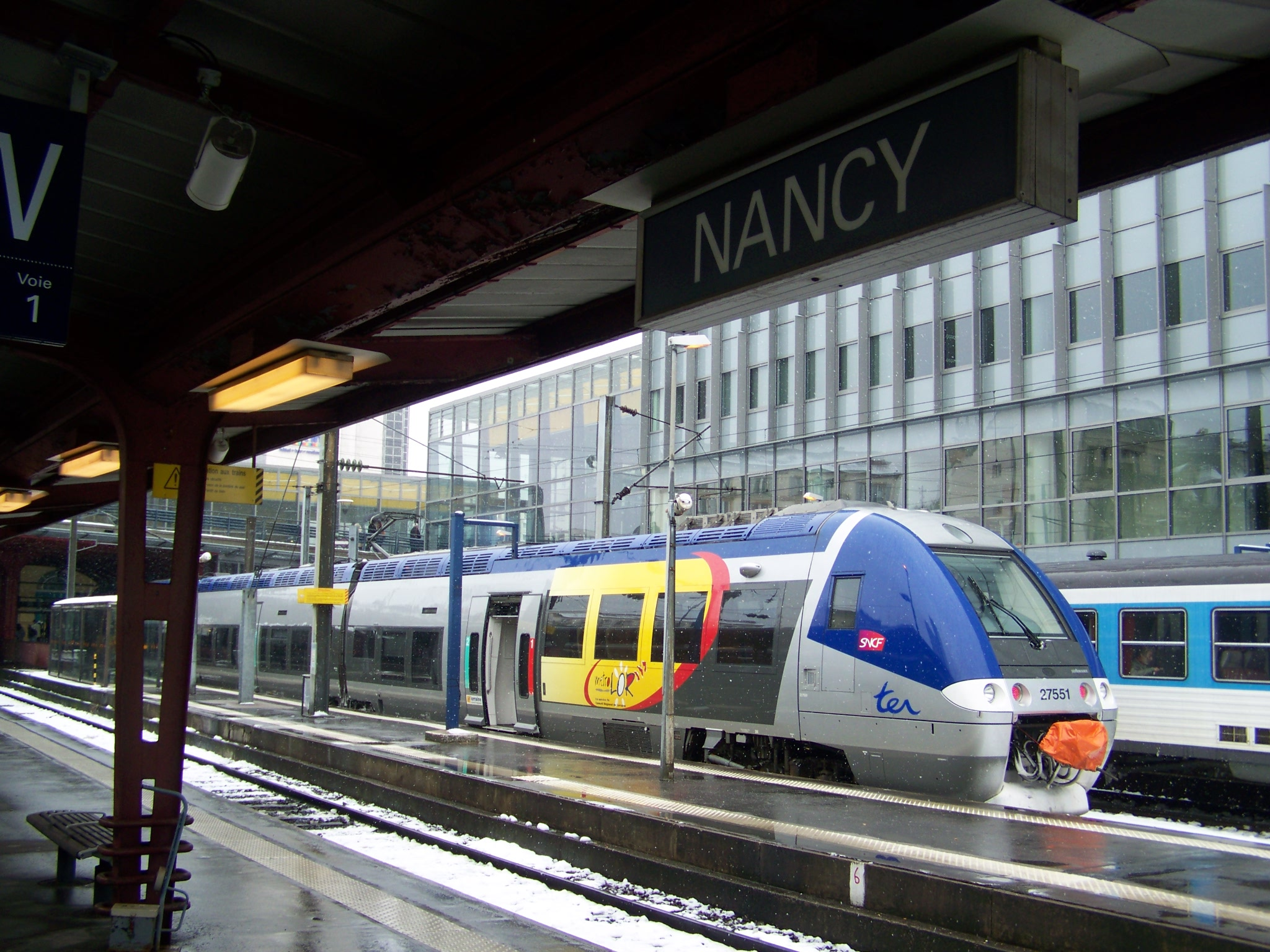
Lorraine ZGC stopped at the Nancy station.

- Strasbourg - Saverne - Sarrebourg
- Strasbourg - Sélestat
- Bâle - Mulhouse
- Mulhouse - Belfort
- Mulhouse - Colmar
- Reims - Charleville-Mézières - Sedan
- Reims - Épernay - Château-Thierry
- Nancy - Épinal - Remiremont
- Nancy - Reims
- Nancy - Saint-Dié-des-Vosges
- Nancy - Longwy
- Nancy - Metz
- Nancy - Strasbourg
- Metz - Strasbourg
- Metz - Forbach

=== TER Normandie ===
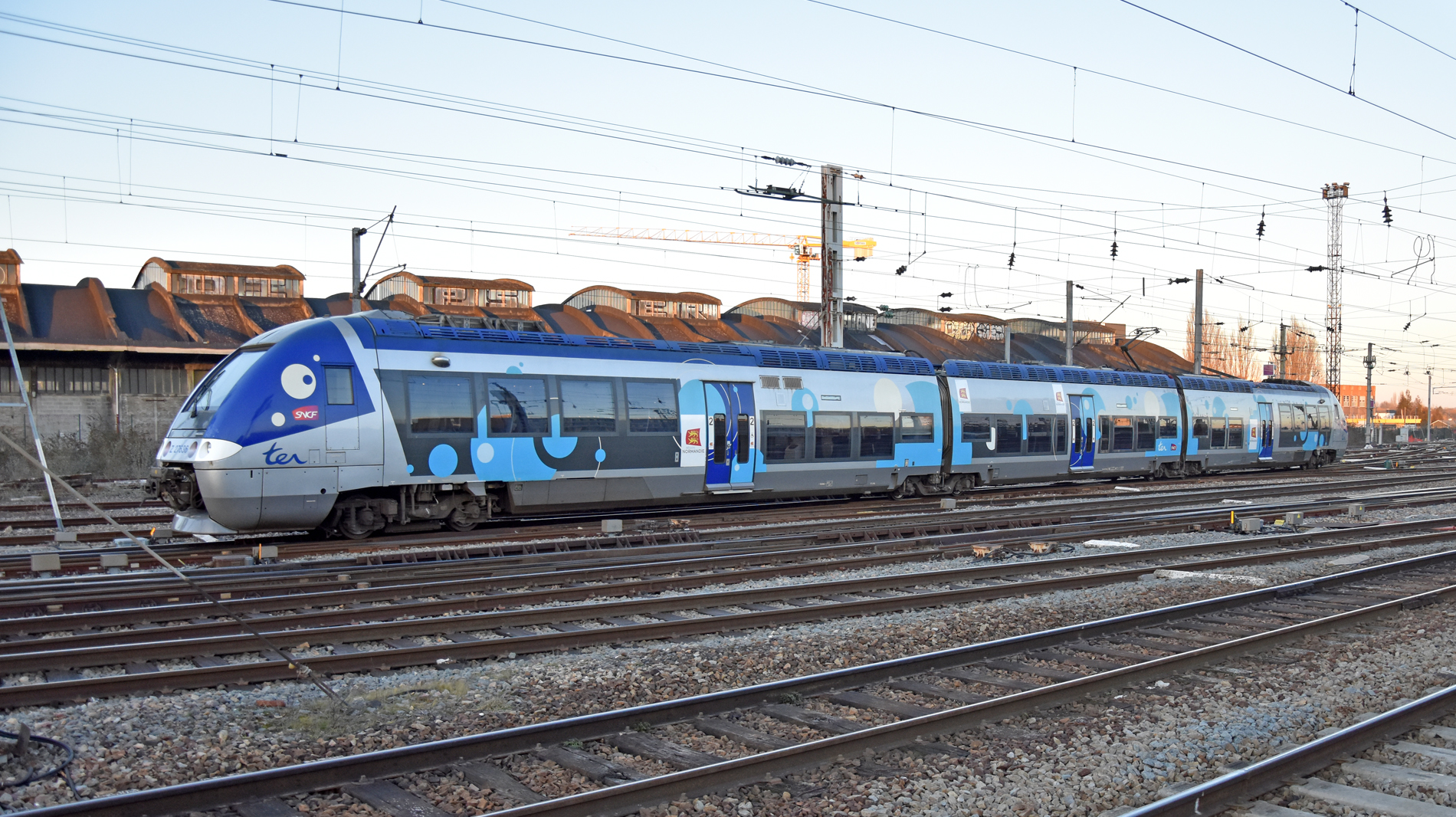
TER Normandie ZGC stopped at the Amiens station.

- Lisieux - Cherbourg
- Lisieux - Saint-Lô
- Lisieux - Trouville-Deauville
- Elbeuf - Saint-Aubin - Rouen - Yvetot
- Rouen - Mantes-la-Jolie
- Rouen - Amiens
- Rouen - Le Havre

=== TER Occitanie ===
- Cerbère or Portbou - Avignon
- Cerbère or Portbou - Marseille
- Béziers - Neussargues
- Toulouse - Agen
- Toulouse - Brive La Gaillarde
- Toulouse - Narbonne
- Toulouse - Latour de Carol - Enveitg
- Toulouse - Pau

=== TER Pays de la Loire ===
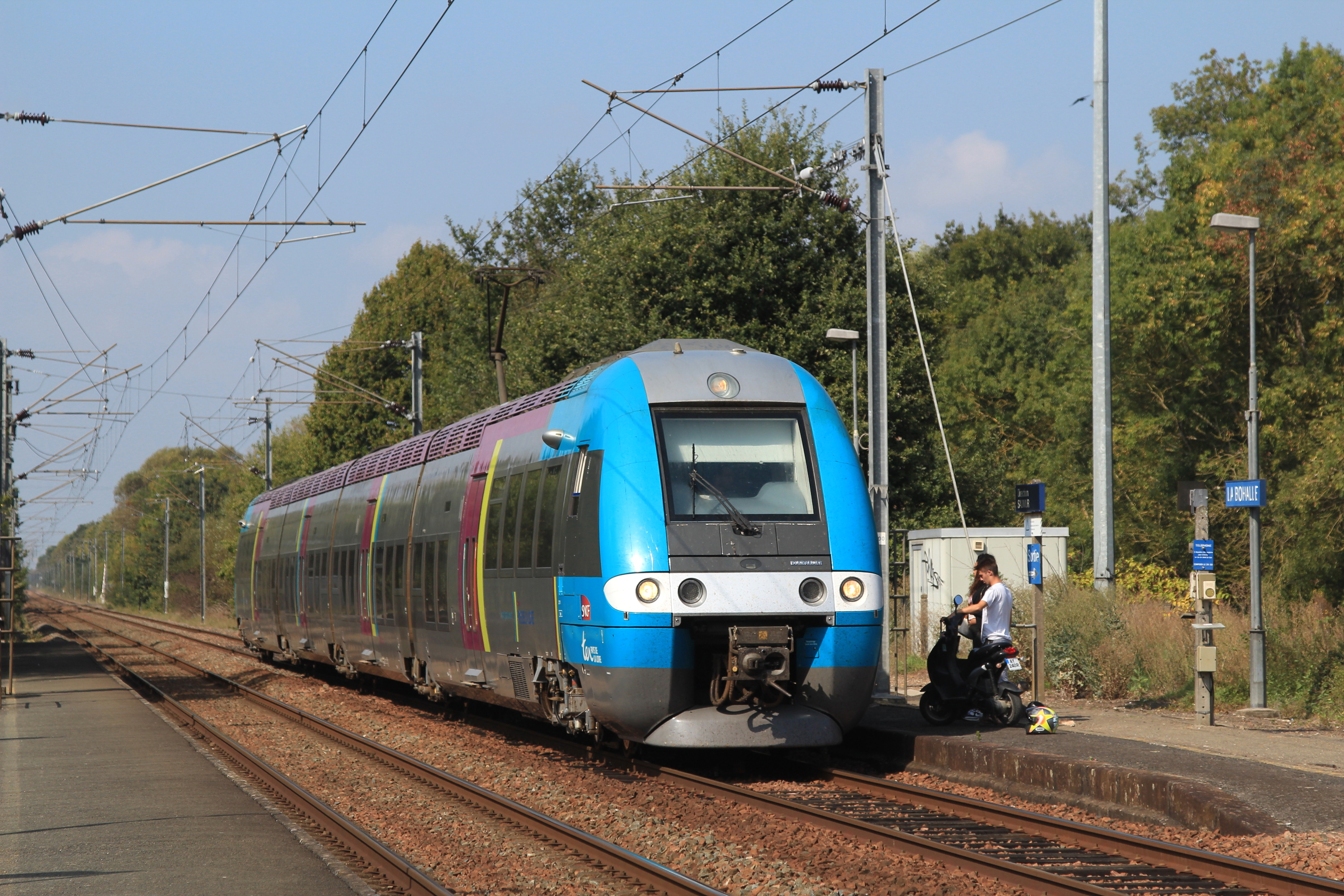
TER Pays de la Loire ZGC stopped at the La Bohalle station.

- Nantes station - Les Sables-d'Olonne
- Le Mans station - Le Croisic
- Angers station - Thouars
- Saint-Nazaire station - Redon
- Redon - Nantes
- Nantes - Rennes
- Rennes - Le Mans

== Distribution of orders ==
Regions (before merger)	Regions (after merger)	Number of 3-car set	Number of 4 car-set	Total	Remarks	Layout
Alsace	Grand Est	0 (3 ordered)	6	6	Transformed into 4-car set	
Aquitaine	Occitanie	0	0	0		First and second class, medium distance network
Auvergne	Auvergne-Rhône-Alpes	0 (3 ordered)	0	0	The 3 trains were sold to Midi Pyrénées	
Basse Normandie	Normandie	0 (9 ordered)	9	9	Transformed into 4-car set in 2020	First and second class, medium distance network
Bourgogne	Bourgogne-Franche-Comté	10	0	10		Single class, medium distance network
Bretagne	Bretagne	6	8	14		First and second class, high comfort
Centre	Centre-Val de Loire	0	10	10		First and second class, high comfort
Champagne-Ardenne	Grand Est	13	0	13		
Franche-Comté	Bourgogne-Franche-Comté	4	0	4		Single class, medium distance network
Haute normandie	Normandie	24	0	24		
Languedoc Rousillon	Occitanie	0	37	37		First and second class, medium distance network
Lorraine	Grand Est	18	14	32		First and second class, high comfort
Midi Pyrénées	Occitanie	19	0	19	With the 3 trains acquired from Auvergne	First and second class, high comfort
Pays de la Loire	Pays de la Loire	0	18	18		
Rhône-Alpes	Auvergne-Rhônes-Alpes	0	15	15		
	Total	94	117	211		

== Accidents ==
- Runaway train TER Z 27500 between Formerie, Serqueux and Sommery on 20 October 2015. This incident occurred after the train hit 2 cows just after the Formerie station, without causing victims.
- Accident between a train TER Z 27500 and a stuck trailer truck on 16 October 2019 on the crossing n°70 at Boulzicourt. This accident caused the derailment of the train. 2 passengers were slightly injured as well as the train driver.

== Models ==
- The LS Models brand makes a model of the Z 27500 in 3 or 4-car set version in HO gauge.
- Different versions of AGC can be downloaded (free or paid) for Train Simulator game.

== Future ==
SNCF has announced on 18 March 2021, that 40% of the TER (French commuter rail) fleet will be renovated in the next 10 years, included Z 27500 Class.

== See also ==
- List of SNCF classes
- Autorail à grande capacité (AGC)
- Media related to SNCF Class Z 27500 at Wikimedia Commons
