= Remar =

Remar may refer to:

- Remar Paşcani, a railway rolling stock company based in Paşcani, Romania
- Remarul 16 Februarie, a railway rolling stock company based in Cluj-Napoca, Romania
