= Autorail à grande capacité =

Category of multiple unit train designed by Bombardier

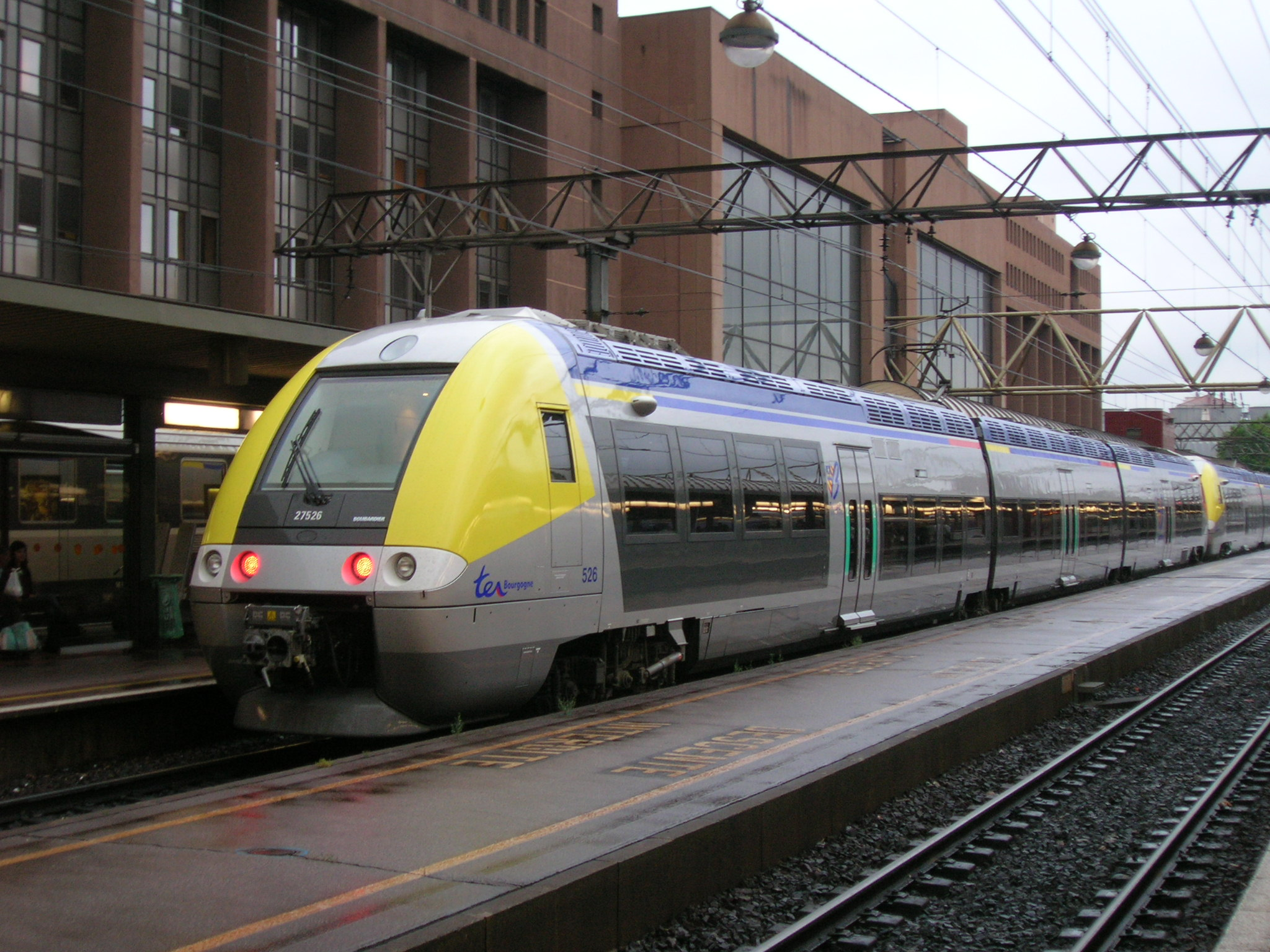
Z 27526 (Z 27500-series) at the Gare de Lyon-Part-Dieu, Lyon, France

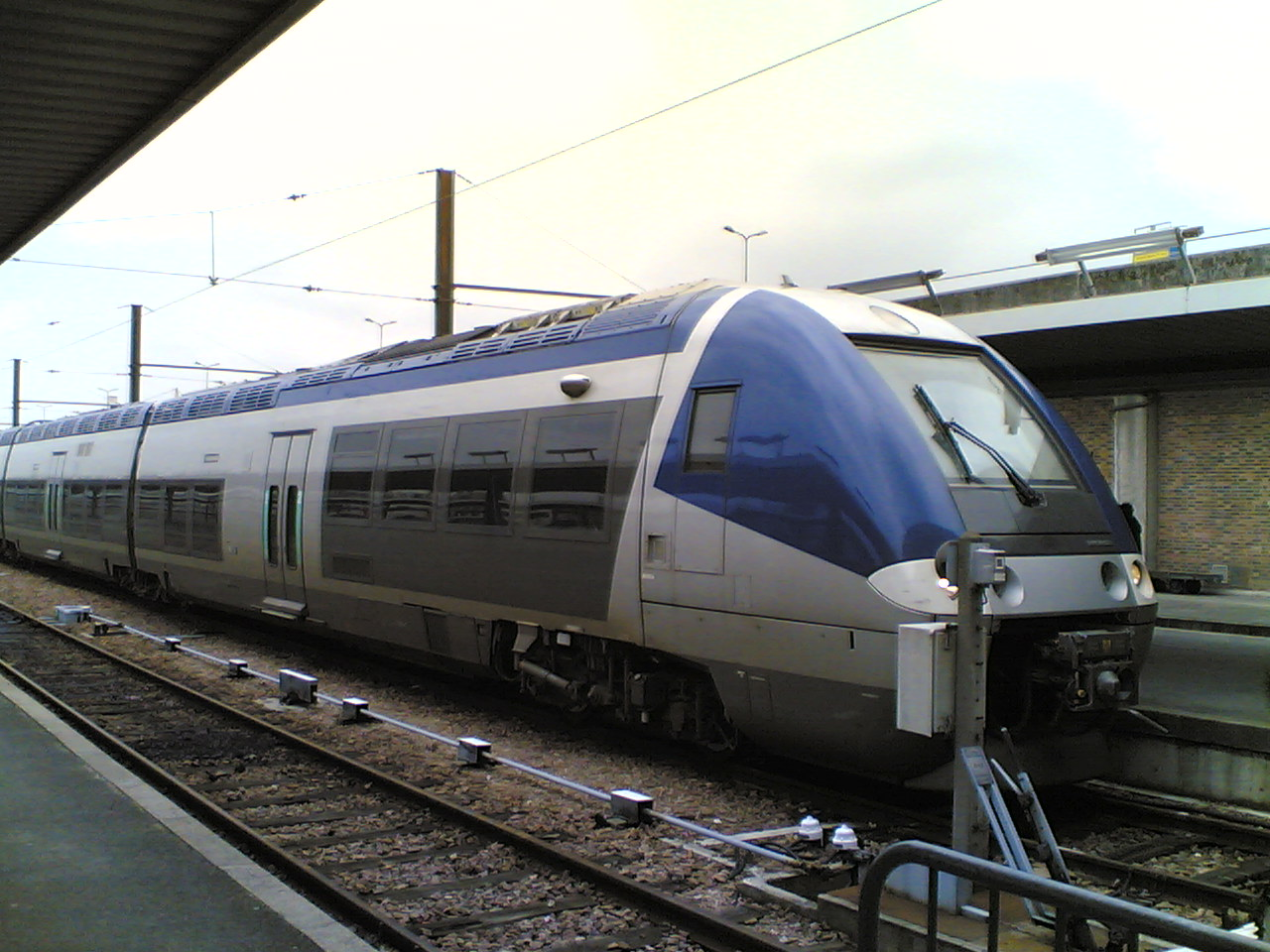
B 81500-series train at the Gare de Bercy, Paris, France

The Autorail à grande capacité (lit. "high-capacity railcar") or AGC is a category of multiple unit train built at Bombardier Transportation's plant in Crespin for the French rail operator SNCF. The train comes in three variants, electric, diesel or dual-mode.

This train was first operated in 2004. It was created at the request of the regional railways of France, and has been very successful, with SNCF acquiring over 700 units. The AGC is designed to be modular, and regions can choose to create trains of 2 to 4 cars, in theory. So far, all trains built have had 3 or 4 cars. As well, the interior design is also modular, and regions can choose to include features such as first class seating, a bar area, ski racks, and other amenities for their fleet.

The Romanian company Remarul 16 Februarie has signed a contract with Bombardier in November 2010, for the purchase of a licence for manufacturing the AGC in Romania at Cluj-Napoca. Under the contract, Remarul will exclusively manufacture this train for sale in six countries: Romania, Bulgaria, Greece, Croatia, Bosnia and Serbia.

All the French regions have acquired AGC Class trains (all variants together). The AGC Class fleet is the most important regional train in France as of 2010. By the fact, with this huge numbers of units in operations, AGC is well implanted in all regions since the 2000s.

== History ==
=== Deliveries ===
The first car delivered was a B 81500, numbered B 81501, and was put into service on 6 February 2004 for TER Midi-Pyrénées service. The 200th trainset was put into service on 20 November 2006 on the TER Haute-Normandie. The first B 82500 unit was delivered in February 2007 and entered into service on the TER Champagne Ardenne on 15 May 2007.

=== Variants ===
The series consists of 4 models:

- X 76500: diesel variant, also designated XGC or Diesel AGC
- Z 27500: electric variant capable of running on both 1,500 V DC and 25 kV 50 Hz AC, also designated ZGC or Electric AGC
- B 81500: dual-mode variant, capable of running on both diesel (by means of a diesel-electric motor) and 1,500 V DC (by means of a pantograph), also designated BGC
- B 82500: dual-mode variant, capable of running on both diesel (by means of a diesel-electric motor) and 1,500 V DC or 25 kV 50 Hz AC (by means of a pantograph), also designated BGC or BiBi (for dual-mode and dual-voltage); these trains are identical to the B 81500-series except for their capability of operating on 1,500 V DC power. This technology enables the B 82500 to glide seamlessly across the entire French railway network and to access electricity from any available source. This will result in energy savings and reduced greenhouse gas emissions, as well as negating infrastructure constraints and the need for passengers to change trains.

== Design ==
=== General ===
Bombardier vehicle design is articulated using bogies between the carriages.

=== Performances ===
Depending on configuration, the trains can attain speeds of up to 160 km/h (99 mph). A two-car set diesel variant was initially proposed (with a speed limit of 140 km/h), but none of this variant was acquired by any region.

== Operating ==
The modularity of these trains permits each railroad (or region) to choose the number of units – currently 3 or 4 – that make up the train, as well as the interior layout of the cars (e.g. lounge car, first class, etc.). Trains can also be made up of mixed units, i.e. a train can be made up from both BGC and ZGC units. Basse-Normandie and Lorraine regions have also ordered sets that consist of both diesel and electric units (i.e. XGC and ZGC). A two-unit variant has never been ordered; the B 82500 is only available in a four-unit version.

== Remarkable trains ==
- "Connected AGC" (in French : AGC Connecté) : since 2009, TER Ocitanie operates an AGC equipped with several sensors and IoT to experiment innovating services in real conditions. With a new onboard/ground communication system, all the data from the sensors and the IoT are sent in real time. On the ground, the collected data are analysed (temperature in the train, water level of the toilets, batteries information, etc.) in order to plan a maintenance operation before the train can be forwarded into a Technicentre(French maintenance Workshop). In the future, these data will be used to create high-performant algorithms to elaborate a predictive maintenance (CBM). This project was developed by SNCF and loT Valley (an association composed of several start-ups specialized on the IoT).

== Accidents and incidents ==
- Accident between a train TER B 82500 and a trailer truck on 12 October 2011 on the crossing n°11 at Saint-Médard-sur-Ile. This accident caused the death of 3 passengers and injuries of others 45 (13 of which seriously). Direct and immediate cause was the stuck truck on the crossing while barrier went down.
- Runaway train TER Z 27500 between Formerie, Serqueux and Sommery on 20 October 2015. This incident occurred after the train hit 2 bovines just after the Formerie station, without causing victims. Direct cause was the loss of all the braking capacity due to the impact.
- Accident between a train TER Z 27500 and a stuck trailer truck on 16 October 2019 on the crossing n°70 at Boulzicourt. This accident caused the derailment of the train. Two peoples were slightly injured as well as the train driver.

== Models ==
- The LS Models brand makes a model of the Z 27500, B 81500 and X 76500 in 3 or 4 units version in HO gauge.
- Different versions of AGC can be downloaded (free or buy) for Train Simulator game.

== Future ==
=== Battery-operated train (BEMU) ===
In January 2021, Bombardier signed a new contract to retrofit and introduce a pre-series of five AGC battery-operated trains by 2023, in collaboration with SNCF Voyageurs and five French regions including Auvergne-Rhône-Alpes, Hauts-de-France, Nouvelle-Aquitaine, Occitanie and Provence-Alpes-Côte d'Azur. The 5 dual-mode (electric/diesel) AGC will be modified into battery-operated trains (BEMU) to help decarbonise French rail transport.

The idea is to convert dual-mode (catenary and diesel-powered) high capacity self-propelled trains to dual-mode battery-powered AGCs. This project offers a proof of concept and a way forward to eliminating diesel trains by 2035, a target set by the French government and SNCF.

=== Extend railway rolling stock life time ===
SNCF announced on 18 March 2021 that 40% of the TER (French commuter rail) fleet will be renovated in the next 10 years, included AGC Class (699 trains) and TER 2N NG Class (232 trains). The most important contract was signed on 18 March 2021, with the Grand Est region.

After about 20 years of operation, the trains need to be entirely checked and modernized in order to continue to be safely operated for 15 to 20 years with better comfort for passengers. This maintenance is an opportunity to improve energy consumption of the train for ecology and durability in mind. Furthermore, region can choose to upgrade the train with new functionalities for the passengers: aesthetic, comfort, better accessibility, electrical outlets on each seat, Wi-fi on board, LED lighting and new passenger information system.

In addition, to reinforce train environmental performances, CO_{2} level regulation for the HVAC system and particulate filters for the Diesel motors will be installed. Such a maintenance needs to immobilize the train for 10 to 20 weeks (according to the selected option). It's also a chance to modernize the manufacturing tools in the different concerned SNCF maintenance workshops (in French : "Technicentre").

== See also ==
- List of SNCF classes
- Transport express régional
- Régions françaises
