= Remarul 16 Februarie =

Rolling stock manufacturer

Coordinates: 46.78474°N 23.57976°E

Remarul 16 Februarie SA
- Company type: Public: (BVB: REFE)
- Industry: Rail
- Founded: 1870; 1990 as an independent company
- Headquarters: Cluj-Napoca, Romania
- Products: Rolling stock repair and construction
- Revenue: €43 million (2008)
- Number of employees: 560 (2009)
- Website: www.remarul.eu

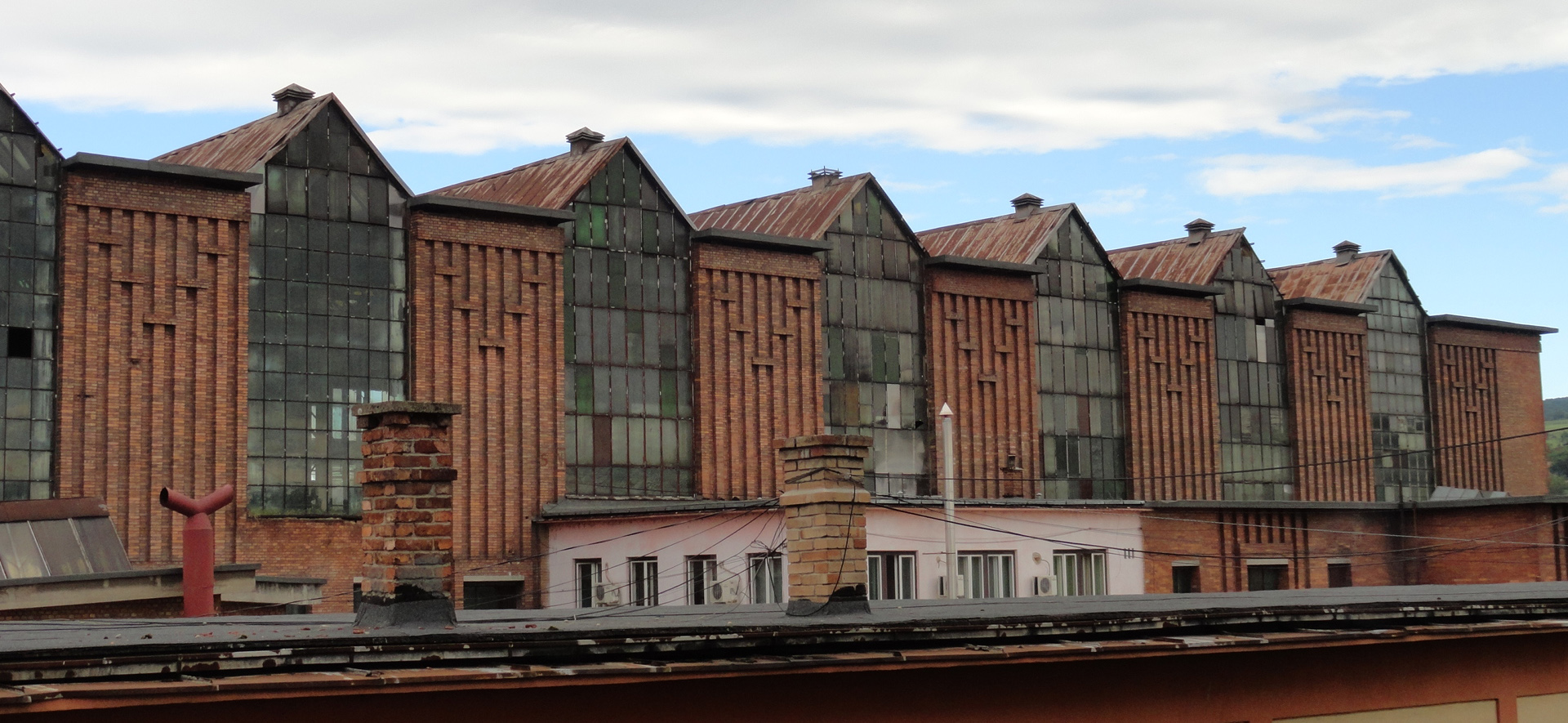
One of the buildings of the company

Remarul 16 Februarie SA based in Cluj-Napoca is a railway rolling stock engineering company with services including repair, maintenance and modernisation.

== History ==
The company's history dates back to the Austro-Hungarian period - 1870, with the creation of a railway workshop to serve the Cluj–Oradea line (Grosswardein-Klausenburg railway (Note: Part of the Ungarische Ostbahn, a line from Nagyvárad (Oradea) to Kolozsvár (Cluj) to Brassó (Brașov))); the works repaired wagons and locomotives.

The initial wooden works building was constructed in 1870, this was replaced by substantial rolling stock works on the current site in 1874 - a locomotive repair shed of 1653m^{2}, a wagon repair shed of 3200m^{2} and a mechanical workshop of 2190m^{2}. With additional offices, warehouses the site had an area of nearly 36,000m^{2}.

In 1882 the works employed 200, by 1890 the number had risen to nearly 500. In 1918 (as a result of the Union of Transylvania with Romania) the works became the Atelierele CFR Cluj, and from 1929 to 1940 it was named Inspecţia Atelierelor Principale CFR Cluj. The works was expanded and rebuilt during the 1920s and 30s with older buildings demolished - by 1938 the expanded works employed 1675.

In 1971 the works began to repair diesel-hydraulic locomotives whilst still maintaining steam locomotives. In 1990 the works was named Remarul 16 Februarie S.A., and was privatised in 2000. Much of the bankrupt metalworking company Metalurgica SA of Aiud, Transylvania, Romania (casting including centrifugal casting, hot forging, mechanical engineering) was acquired in 2006.

In 2009 the company entered into partnership with Caterpillar Inc., acting as a centre for rail vehicle re-motorisation in the region. In 2009 the Company's major shareholders were Transferoviar Group SA (32.96%) and Monica Băiculescu (32%) and Nova Cominvest (6.54%).

In November 2010 the company acquired a license for the production of AGC trainsets from Bombardier Transportation - the license is exclusive for the trains produced for Romania, Bulgaria, Greece, Croatia, Bosnia, and Serbia. The company is expected to invest €20 million and increase the workforce to 1000 for the production of the AGC.

== Products and services ==
The company specialises in construction and repair of railway rolling stock, the company also manufactures parts for hydraulic diesel locomotives. Much of the company's income is based on modernisation of rolling stock. The company's suppliers include Inda Craiova, Softronic Craiova, Caterpillar Inc, Integral Consulting R & D Bucurest, Voith, and Knorr Bremse.

As of 2012 in addition to multiple unit and locomotive repair and modernisations the plant still repairs steam locomotives.
