= SNCF Class B 82500 =

French hybrid bicourant multiple unit

B 82500
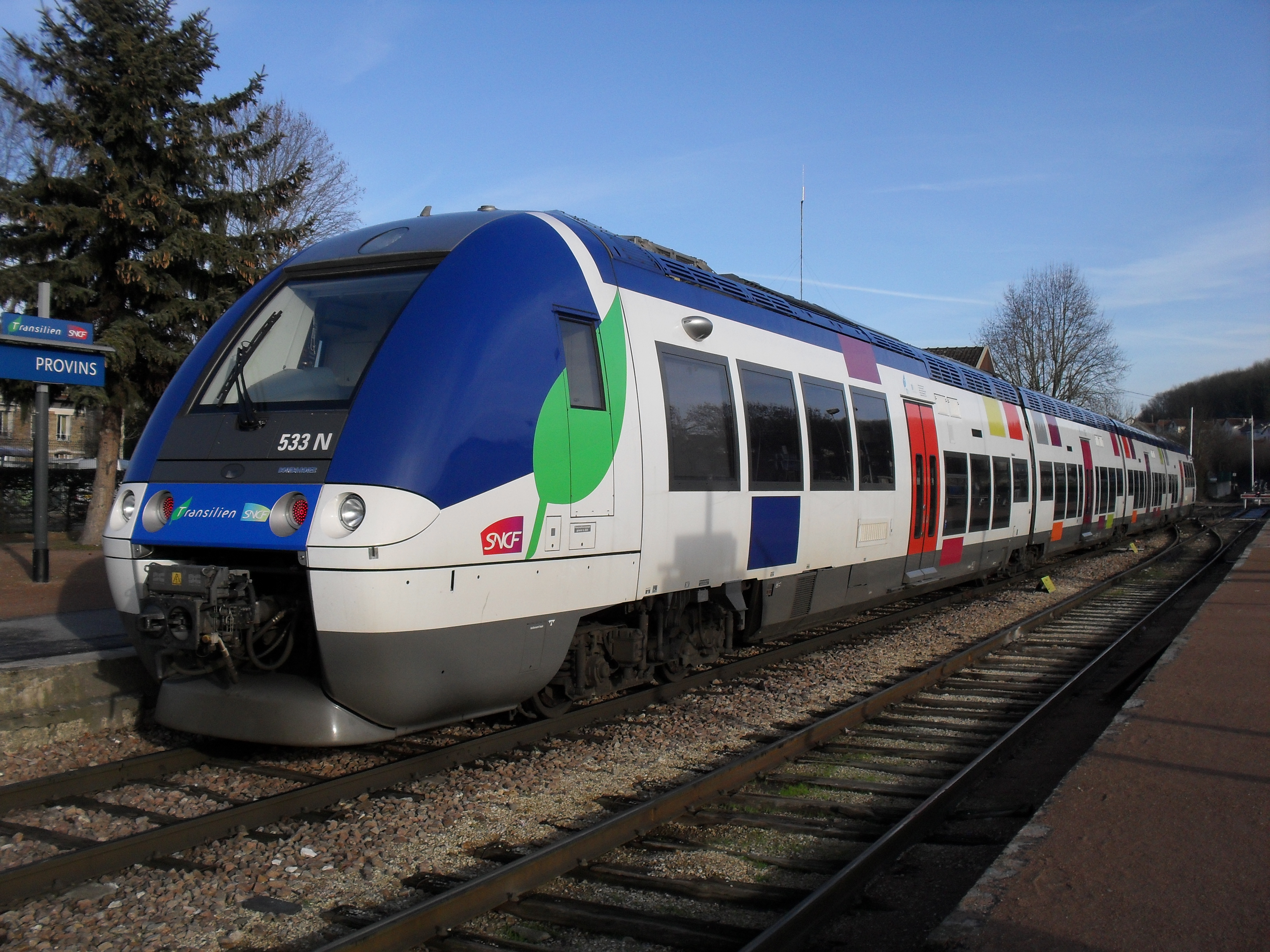
- B82500 electro-diesel multiple unit at Provins
- Built at: Bombardier, Crespin
- Capacity: seated: 204 to 220
- Lines served: Transilien Transilien Line P (Paris-Est)

Specifications
- Train length: 72.8 m (238 ft 10 in)
- Car length: end cars: 21 m (68 ft 10 3/4 in) inner cars: 15.4 m (50 ft 6 1/4 in)
- Width: 2.95 m (9 ft 8 1/8 in)
- Height: 4.02 m (13 ft 2 1/4 in)
- Floor height: 1.26 m (4 ft 1 5/8 in)
- Entry: 0.59 m (1 ft 11 1/4 in)
- Maximum speed: 160 km/h (99 mph)
- Weight: 170 t (167 long tons; 187 short tons)
- Prime mover(s): MAN
- Engine type: Two Diesel Engines
- Power output: 2x 588 kW (789 hp) @1800 rpm Electric; 1,300 kW (1,700 hp)
- Acceleration: diesel: 0.47 m/s^{2} (1.1 mph/s); 1.5 kV : 0.66 m/s^{2} (1.5 mph/s); 25 kV : 0.67 m/s^{2} (1.5 mph/s)
- Electric system(s): Overhead line: 25 kV 50 Hz AC; 1,500 V DC
- Current collector(s): Pantograph
- UIC classification: Bo'2'2'2'Bo'

Notes/references
- Sources = except where noted

The B 82500 (often referred to as BGC or BiBi) is a class of dual-mode, multi-system, diesel and overhead electrification (1.5 kV DC, 25 kV AC) powered multiple unit built by Bombardier for SNCF. It is one variant of the Autorail à Grande Capacité. These trains were built at Bombardier's rail manufacturing plant in Crespin. Currently, it operates on TER lines and Transilien Line P.

The class was officially launched at Troyes station on 9 October 2007 for service on the TER Champagne-Ardenne network.

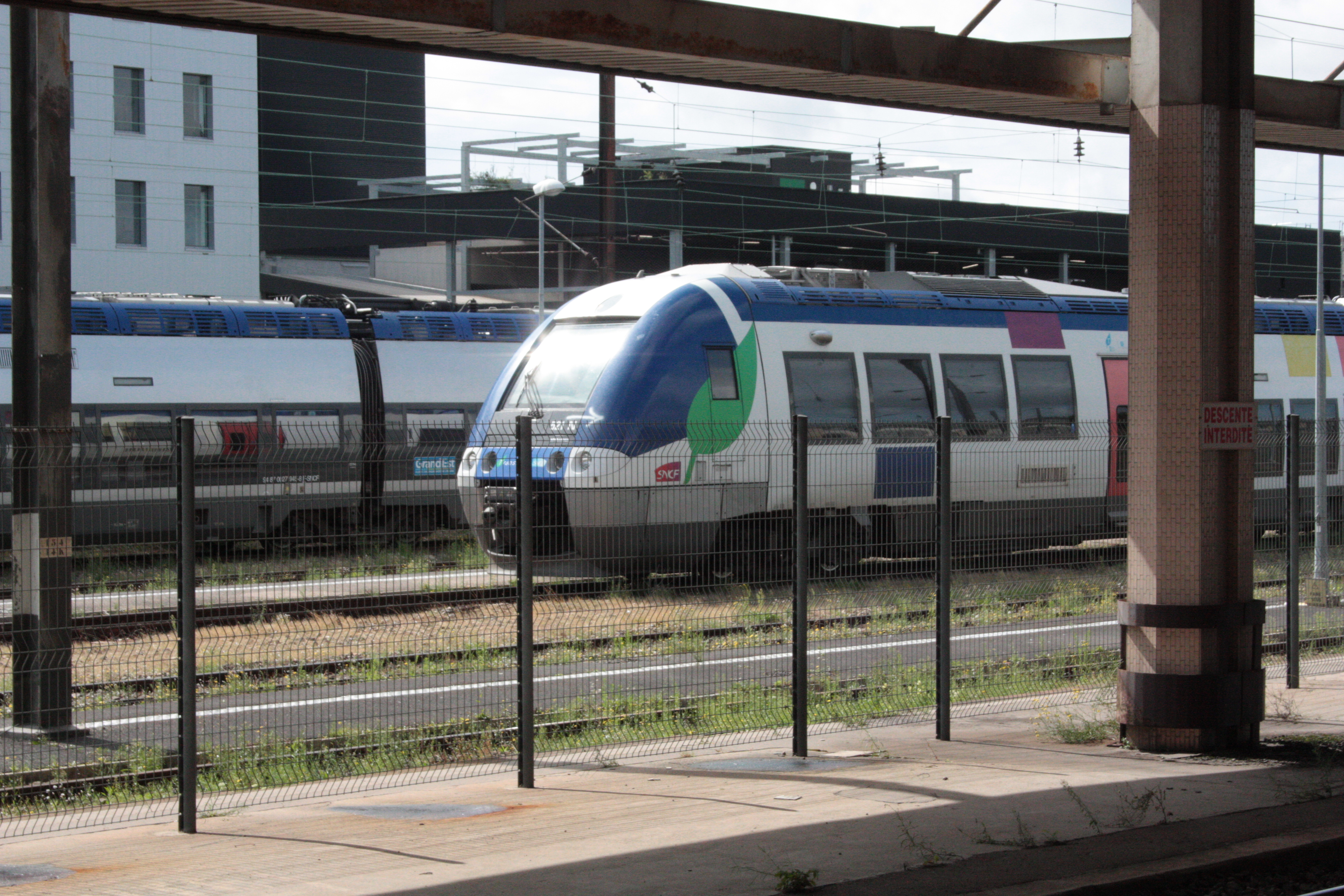
B 82500 electro-diesel unit at Metz-Ville
