= SNCF Class B 81500 =

French hybrid multiple unit

B 81500
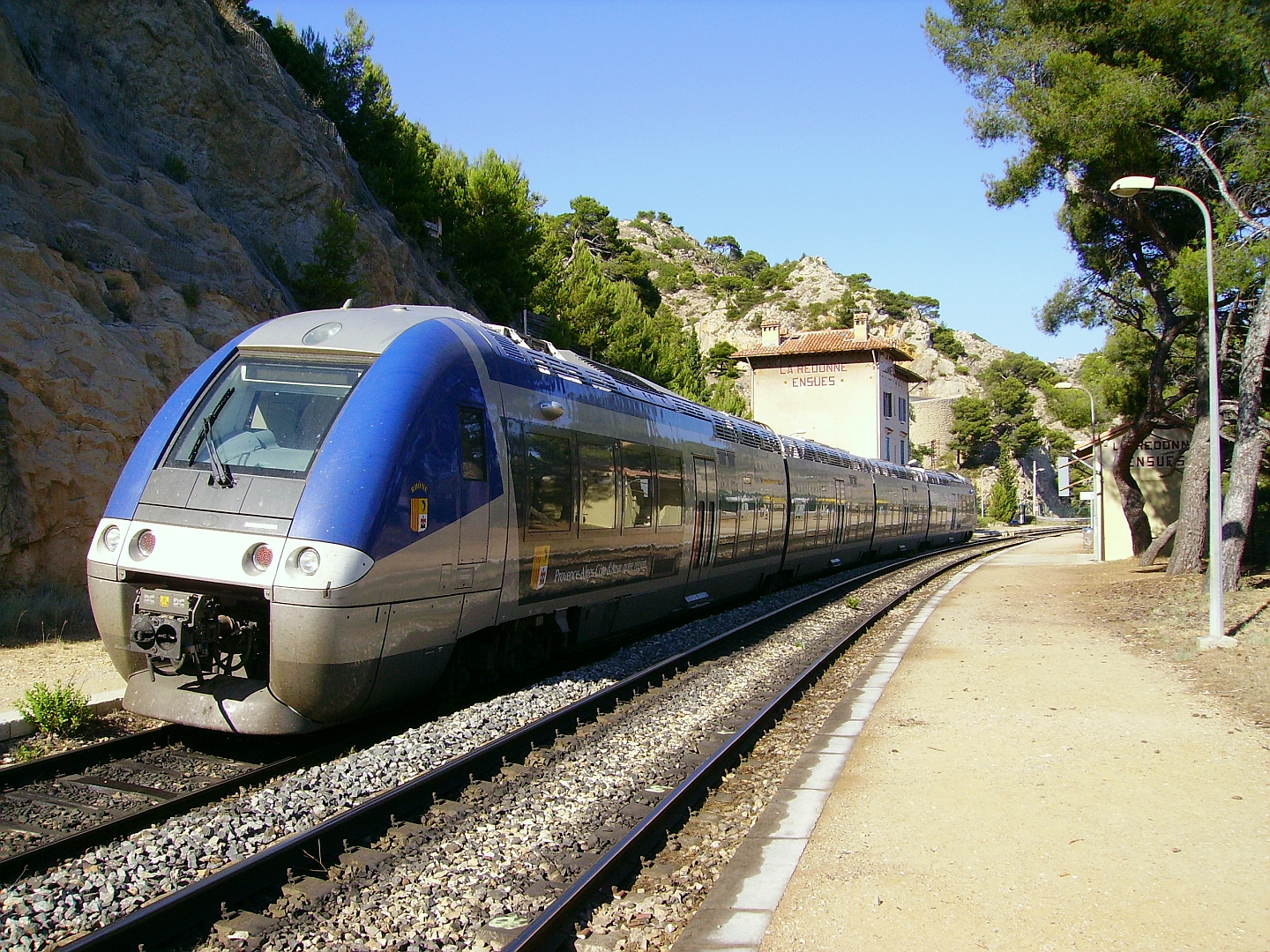
- A SNCF Class B 81500 at La Redonne on the Marseille–Ventimiglia railway.
- Built at: Bombardier, Crespin
- Constructed: 2004—2007
- Entered service: 2005

Specifications
- Train length: 72.8 m (238 ft 10 in) – 4 cars 57.4 m (188 ft 4 in) – 3 cars
- Maximum speed: 160 km/h (99 mph)
- Power output: electric: 1,900 kW (2,500 hp) diesel: 1,324 kW (1,776 hp)
- Electric system(s): Overhead line, 1,500 V DC
- Current collection: Pantograph

Notes/references

The B 81500 (often called BGC) is a class of bi-mode multiple units built by Bombardier for SNCF and used on the TER network in France. They are primarily used on suburban and regional services. It has been in operation since 2005 on the TER Aquitaine, TER Bourgogne, TER Centre, TER Champagne-Ardenne, TER Languedoc-Roussillon, TER Limousin, TER Midi-Pyrénées, TER PACA, TER Pays de la Loire, and TER Rhône-Alpes lines.

The Class B 81500 trains are composed of four or five cars, and have a capacity of around 300 passengers. They feature air-conditioning, comfortable seating, and are equipped with power outlets and onboard passenger information systems. They are designed to be accessible to passengers with reduced mobility, with features such as wheelchair ramps and audio announcements.

The trains are capable of operating on diesel power as well as a 1.5 kV DC electricity supply, and have a top speed of 160 km/h (99 mph). They have a modern and aerodynamic design, which helps to reduce energy consumption and improve their performance.

The class B 81500 trains are known for their reliability, comfort and energy efficiency. They are widely used in the French railway network and have been a key element in the modernization of the suburban and regional services in France.

== Gallery ==
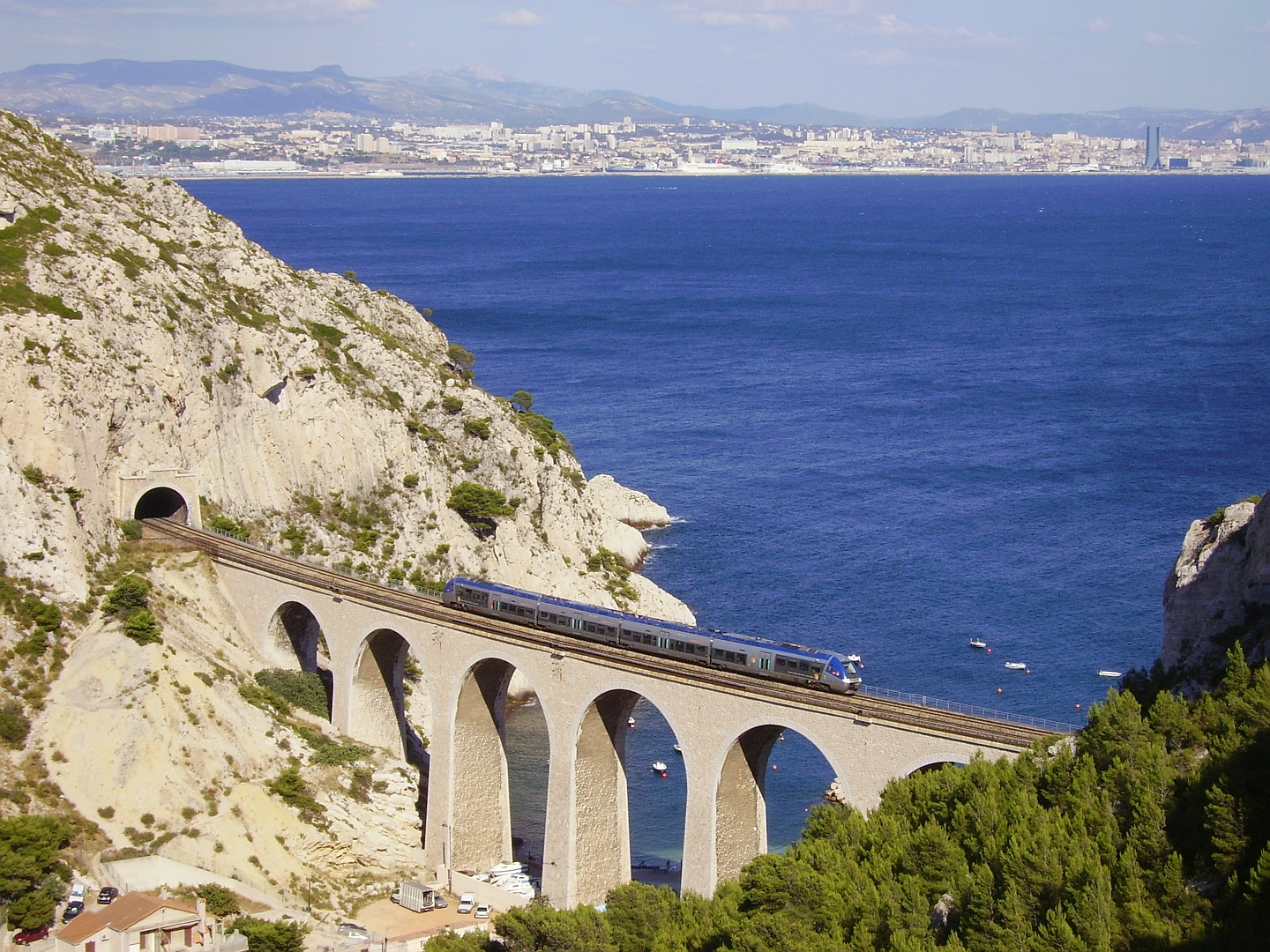
A SNCF Class B 81500 at La Vesse.

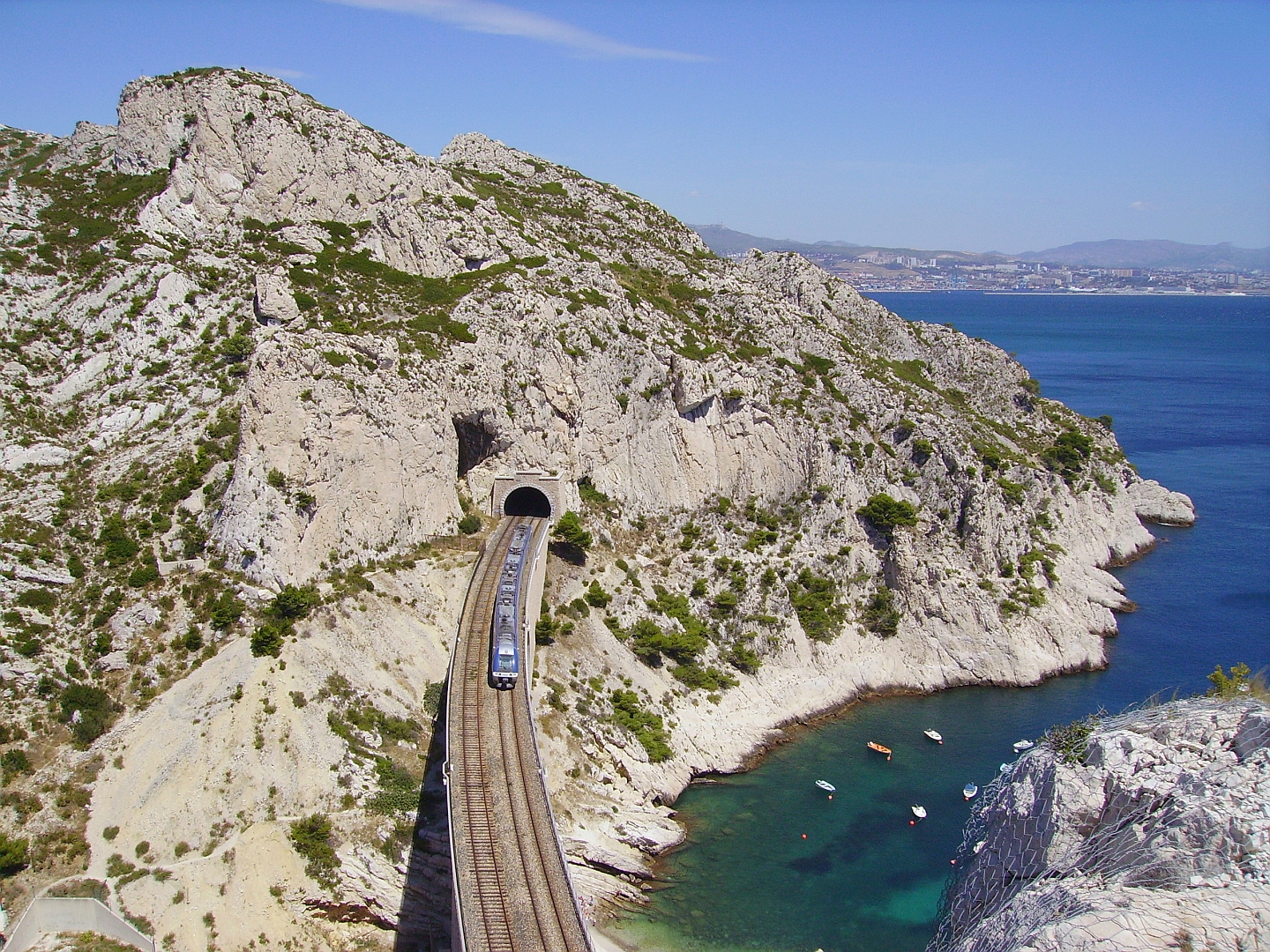
A SNCF Class B 81500 at La Vesse.

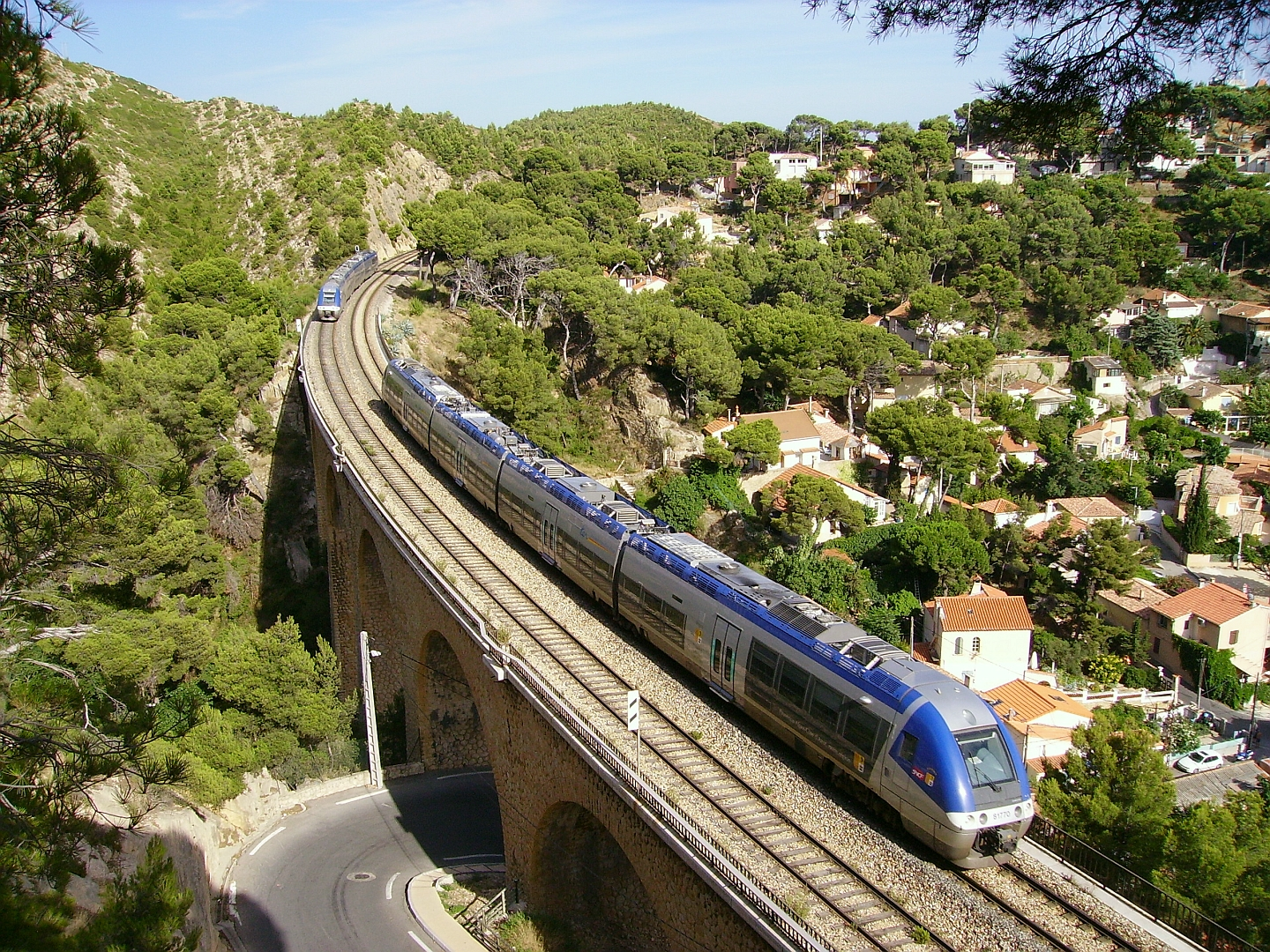
A SNCF Class B 81500 at La Redonne on the Marseille–Ventimiglia railway.
