= Couffoulens–Leuc station =

Railway station in France

Coordinates: 43°09′20″N 2°18′57″E

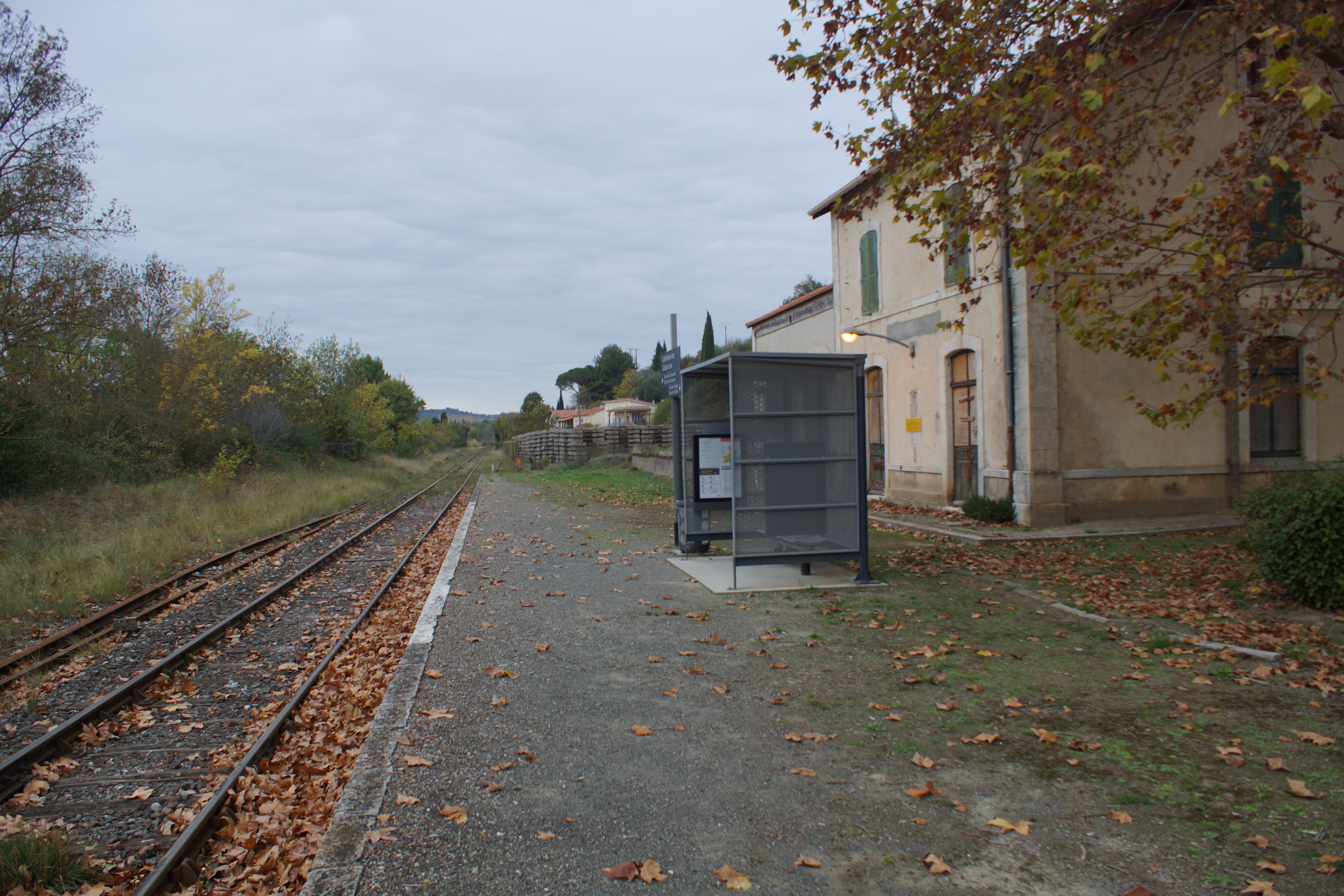
railway station Couffoulens-Leuc

Couffoulens-Leuc is a railway station between Couffoulens and Leuc, Occitanie, France. The station is on the Carcassonne–Rivesaltes line. The station is served by TER (local) services operated by the SNCF.

== Train services ==
The following services currently call at Couffoulens-Leuc:

- local service (TER Occitanie) Carcassonne–Limoux

Preceding station	TER Occitanie	Following station
Carcassonne Terminus	29	Verzeille towards Limoux
