= Verzeille station =

Railway station in Verzeille, France

Coordinates: 43°07′49″N 2°19′17″E

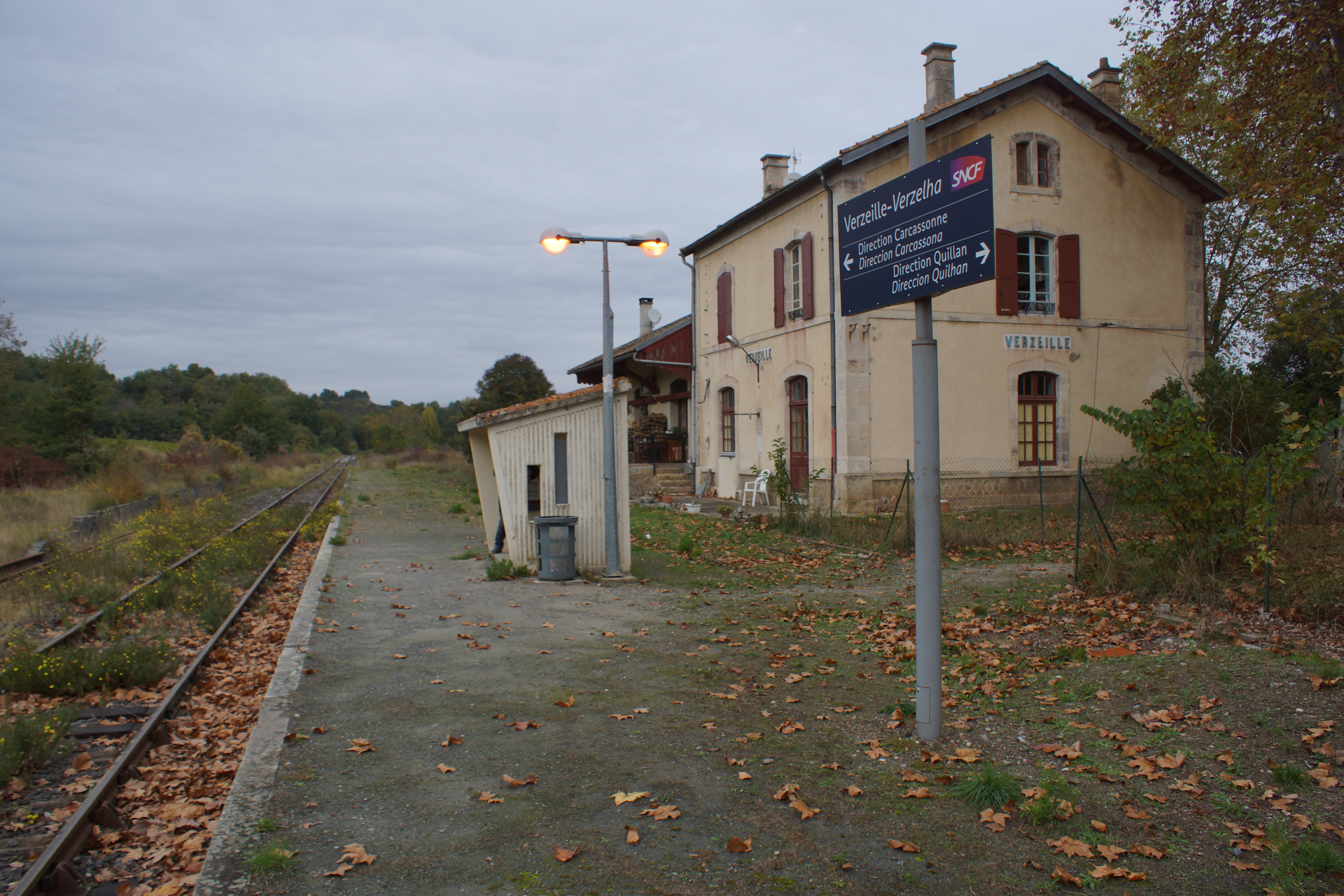
Railway station.

Verzeille is a railway station in Verzeille, Occitanie, France. The station is on the Carcassonne–Rivesaltes line. The station is served by TER (local) services operated by the SNCF.

== Train services ==
The following services currently call at Verzeille:

- local service (TER Occitanie) Carcassonne–Limoux

Preceding station	TER Occitanie	Following station
Couffoulens-Leuc towards Carcassonne	29	Pomas towards Limoux
