= Pomas =

Commune in Occitanie, France

- Commune
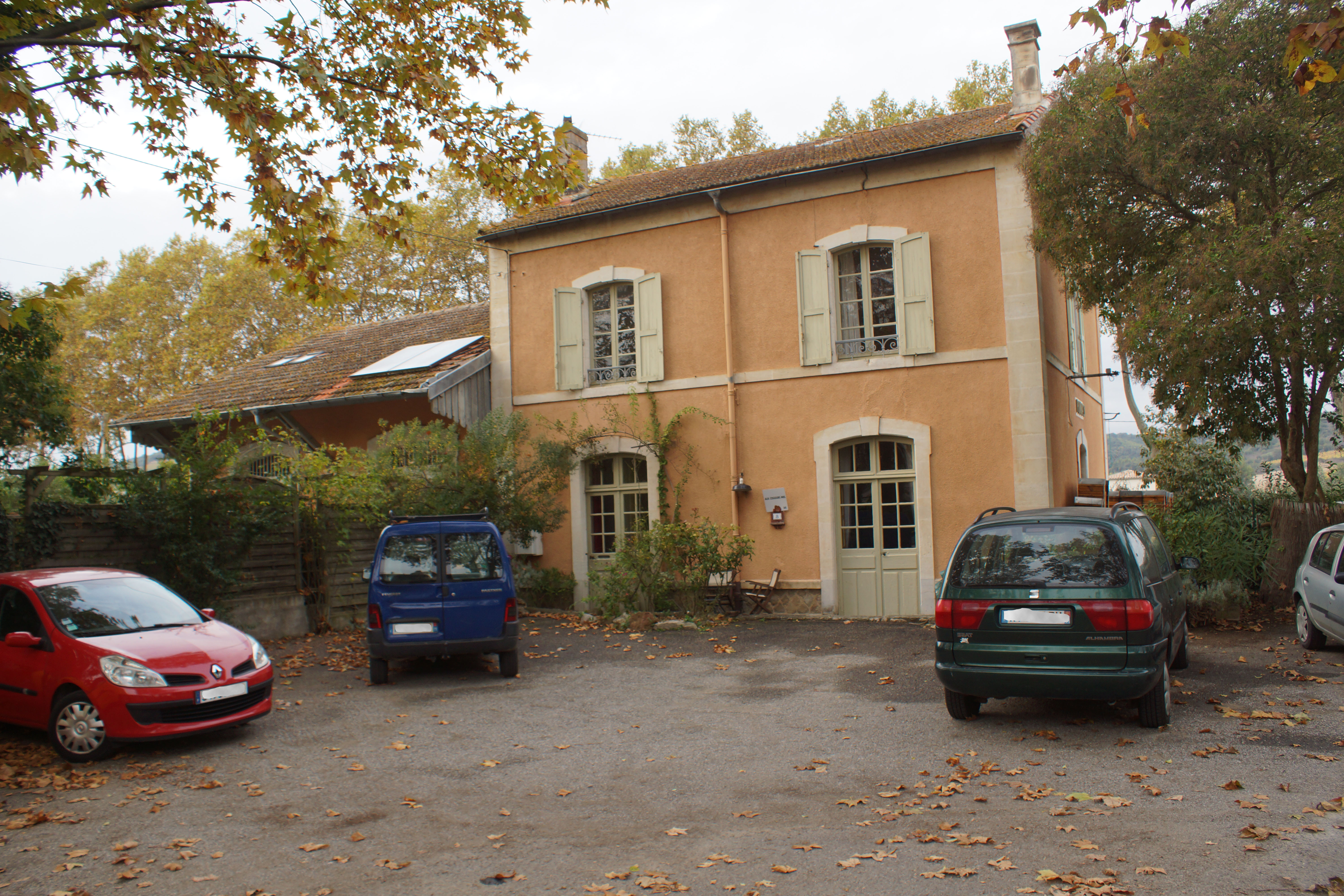
- The old railway station in Pomas

- Coat of arms
- Location of Pomas
- Location within France Location within Occitanie
- Coordinates: 43°06′45″N 2°17′34″E
- Country: France
- Region: Occitania
- Department: Aude
- Arrondissement: Limoux
- Canton: La Région Limouxine
- Intercommunality: Carcassonne Agglo

Government
  - Mayor (2020–2026): Christian Robert
- Area^{1}: 10.15 km^{2} (3.92 sq mi)
- Elevation: 150 m (490 ft)
- Highest elevation: 347 m (1,138 ft)
- Lowest elevation: 136 m (446 ft)
- Population (2023): 1,017
  - Density: 100.2/km^{2} (259.5/sq mi)
- Time zone: UTC+01:00 (CET)
  - Summer (DST): UTC+02:00 (CEST)
- INSEE/Postal code: 11293 /11250
- ^{1} French Land Register data, which excludes lakes, ponds, glaciers > 1 km^{2} (0.386 sq mi or 247 acres) and river estuaries.

Pomas (French pronunciation: [pɔmas], [pɔmɑ]; Occitan: Pomars, [ˈpumaɾs]) is a commune in the French department of Aude, and the region of Occitania, southern France. Located 4 km northwest of Saint-Hilaire, 15 km south of Carcassonne, 100 km southeast of Toulouse.

== History ==
Pomas dates back to the 9th century, when it was known as Pomaris.

In 1212, the local lord, Bernard de Pomars, a Cathar, was denounced as a heretic; his lands were taken from him and given to Philippe Golhoin. In 1559, the Rabot family took over the lordship of Pomas. The lordship was sold off in 1719.

On 24 August 2026, a large and intense tornado struck Pomas, leaving 300 homes damaged or almost entirely destroyed. Over 2 thousand houses were left without electricity for a day and a half. A castle was partly damaged as it was struck by the tornado, over 1 thousand people were in critical need. 41 people were injured, with 13 being evacuated to hospitals. 3 people are missing, likely stuck under debris. The tornado crossed the entirety of Pomas, later dissipating after a multiple kilometer path.

== Attractions ==
The château de Pomas dates back to the 12th century and is notable for its square tower and cruciform archers' windows.

Pomas has a small single track railway station on the Carcassonne - Rivesaltes railway line, between Verzeille and Limoux.

Shops include a bakery, a specialist local wine shop, and a tobacconist. It has a small private museum specialising in exotic shells.

There are attractive walking routes in the hills around Pomas.

== Population ==
Historical population
Year	Pop.	±% p.a.
1968	501	—
1975	488	−0.37%
1982	491	+0.09%
1990	570	+1.88%
1999	645	+1.38%
2007	736	+1.66%
2012	833	+2.51%
2017	887	+1.26%
2023	1,017	+2.31%
Source: INSEE

== See also ==
- Communes of the Aude department
