= Pomas station =

Railway station in Occitanie, France

Coordinates: 43°06′44″N 2°17′18″E

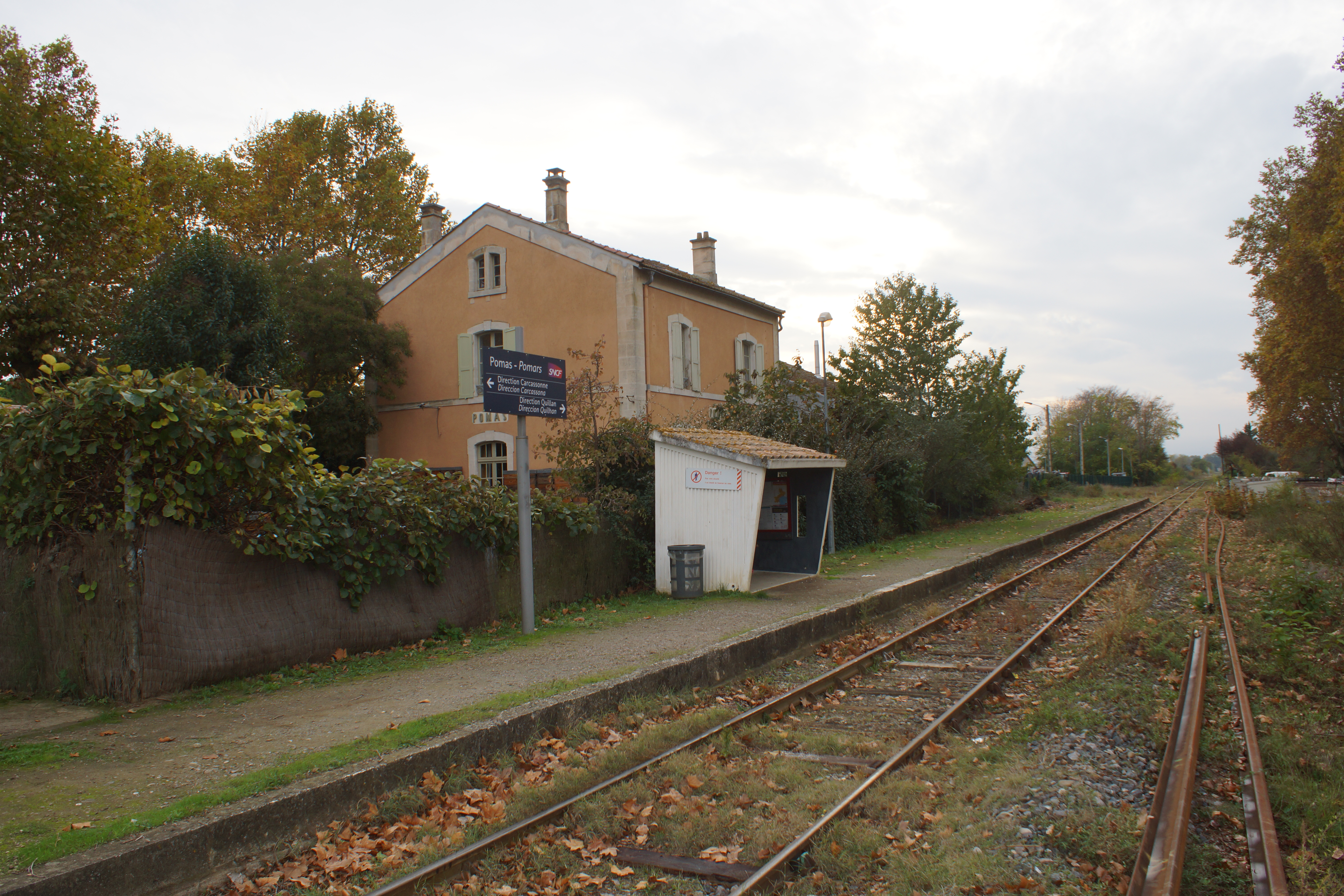
Pomas Railway station.

Pomas is a railway station in Pomas, Occitanie, France. The station is on the Carcassonne–Rivesaltes line. The station is served by TER (local) services operated by the SNCF.

== Train services ==
The following services currently call at Pomas:

- local service (TER Occitanie) Carcassonne–Limoux

| Preceding station | TER Occitanie | Following station |
|---|---|---|
| Verzeille towards Carcassonne | 29 | Limoux-Flassian towards Limoux |
