= Couffoulens =

Commune in Occitanie, France

- Commune
- Coat of arms
- Location of Couffoulens
- Location within France Location within Occitanie
- Coordinates: 43°09′22″N 2°18′26″E
- Country: France
- Region: Occitania
- Department: Aude
- Arrondissement: Carcassonne
- Canton: Carcassonne-2
- Intercommunality: Carcassonne Agglo

Government
  - Mayor (2020–2026): Jean-Régis Guichou
- Area^{1}: 9.47 km^{2} (3.66 sq mi)
- Elevation: 130 m (430 ft)
- Highest elevation: 260 m (850 ft)
- Lowest elevation: 116 m (381 ft)
- Population (2023): 533
  - Density: 56.3/km^{2} (146/sq mi)
- Time zone: UTC+01:00 (CET)
  - Summer (DST): UTC+02:00 (CEST)
- INSEE/Postal code: 11102 /11250
- ^{1} French Land Register data, which excludes lakes, ponds, glaciers > 1 km^{2} (0.386 sq mi or 247 acres) and river estuaries.

Couffoulens (French pronunciation: [kufulɛ̃s]; Occitan: Confolenç) is a commune in the Aude department in southern France. Couffoulens-Leuc station has rail connections to Carcassonne and Limoux.

== Population ==
Historical population
Year	Pop.	±% p.a.
1968	527	—
1975	464	−1.80%
1982	478	+0.43%
1990	549	+1.75%
1999	541	−0.16%
2007	568	+0.61%
2012	627	+2.00%
2017	601	−0.84%
2023	533	−1.98%
Source: INSEE

== See also ==
- Communes of the Aude department
