= Palaja =

Commune in Occitanie, France

- Commune
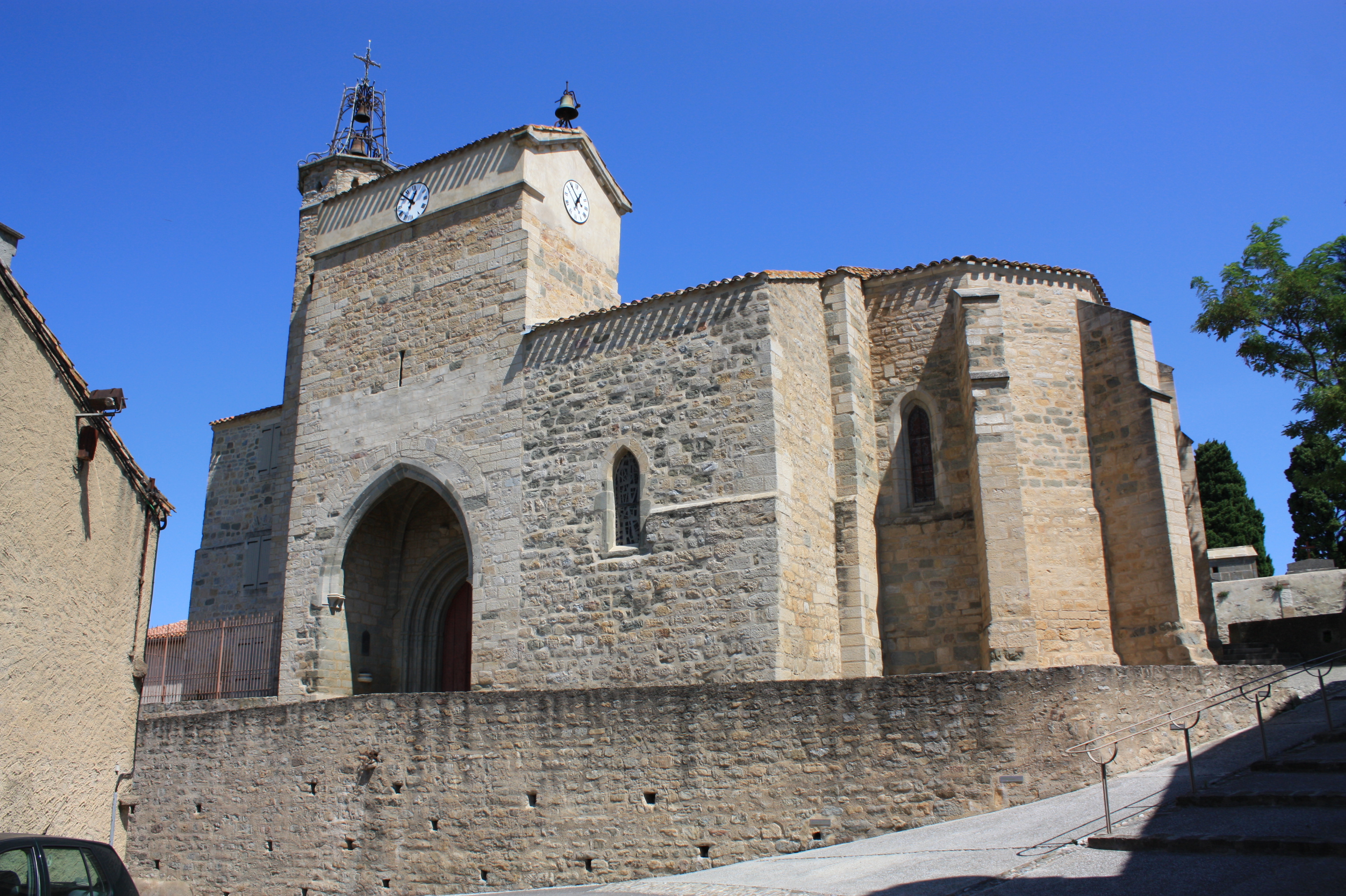
- The church in Palaja

- Coat of arms
- Location of Palaja
- Location within France Location within Occitanie
- Coordinates: 43°10′25″N 2°23′09″E
- Country: France
- Region: Occitania
- Department: Aude
- Arrondissement: Carcassonne
- Canton: Carcassonne-2
- Intercommunality: Carcassonne Agglo

Government
  - Mayor (2020–2026): Thierry Lecina
- Area^{1}: 14.69 km^{2} (5.67 sq mi)
- Elevation: 123 m (404 ft)
- Highest elevation: 440 m (1,440 ft)
- Lowest elevation: 140 m (460 ft)
- Population (2023): 2,722
  - Density: 185.3/km^{2} (479.9/sq mi)
- Time zone: UTC+01:00 (CET)
  - Summer (DST): UTC+02:00 (CEST)
- INSEE/Postal code: 11272 /11570
- ^{1} French Land Register data, which excludes lakes, ponds, glaciers > 1 km^{2} (0.386 sq mi or 247 acres) and river estuaries.

Palaja (French pronunciation: [palaʒa]; Occitan: Palajan) is a small French town, located in the department of Aude in Occitanie region. It is part of the urban area of Carcassonne.

Because of its proximity to the medieval city of Carcassonne and its environment, the municipality of Palaja is renowned for its living environment, hiking trails and the many possible activities within a radius of five kilometres (golf, beach, acrobatic park, water sports centre, Australian park...). It represents the wealthy suburbs of Carcassonne.

== Population ==
Historical population
Year	Pop.	±% p.a.
1968	269	—
1975	585	+11.74%
1982	1,017	+8.22%
1990	1,503	+5.00%
1999	1,851	+2.34%
2007	2,129	+1.76%
2012	2,146	+0.16%
2017	2,357	+1.89%
2023	2,722	+2.43%
Source: INSEE

== See also ==
- Communes of the Aude department
