= Mas-des-Cours =

Commune in Occitanie, France

- Commune
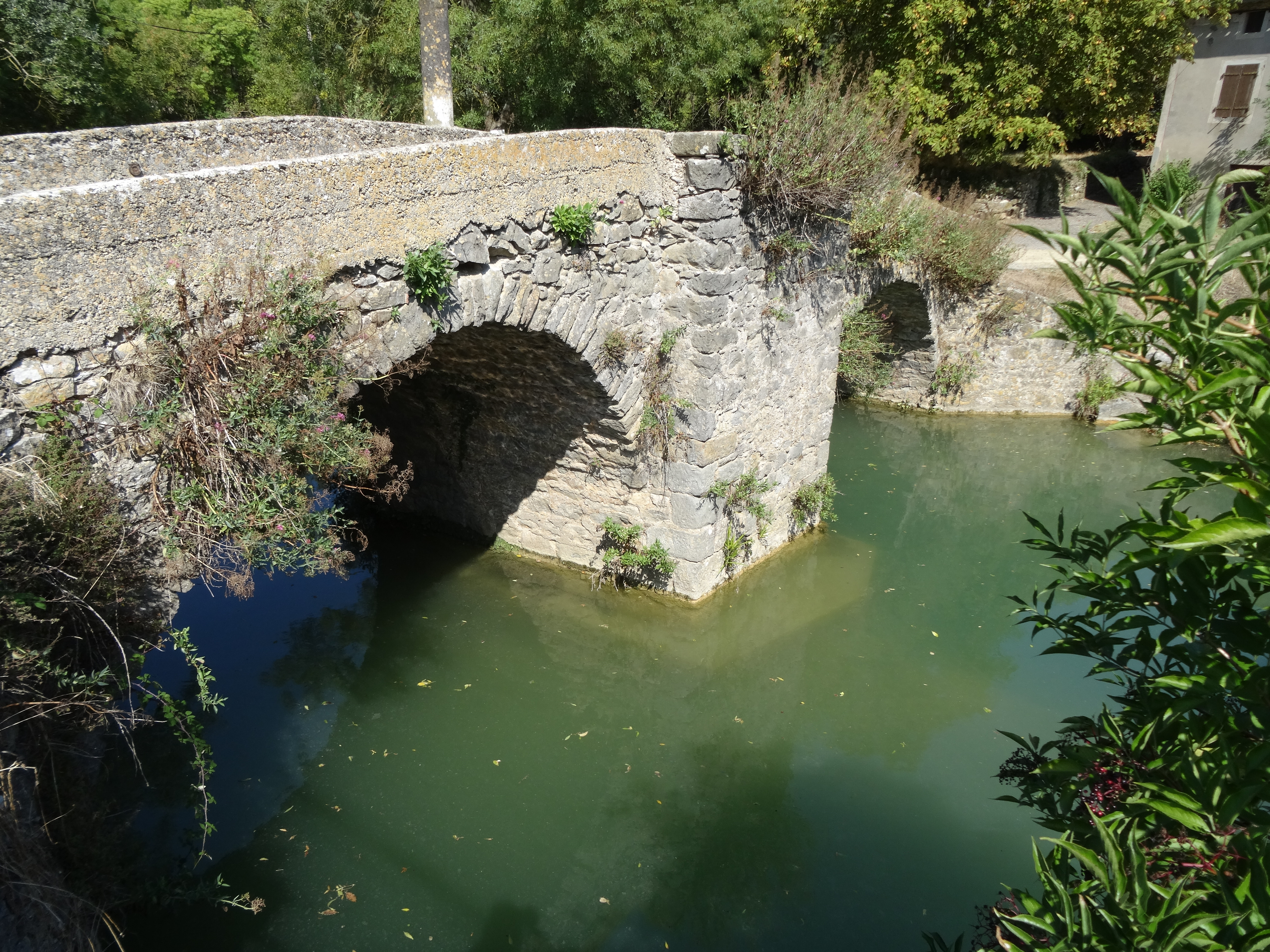
- The bridge over the Lauquette river in Mas-des-Cours

- Coat of arms
- Location of Mas-des-Cours
- Location within France Location within Occitanie
- Coordinates: 43°07′50″N 2°25′27″E
- Country: France
- Region: Occitania
- Department: Aude
- Arrondissement: Carcassonne
- Canton: Carcassonne-2
- Intercommunality: Carcassonne Agglo

Government
  - Mayor (2020–2026): Rolland Mazet
- Area^{1}: 7.55 km^{2} (2.92 sq mi)
- Elevation: 340 m (1,120 ft)
- Highest elevation: 493 m (1,617 ft)
- Lowest elevation: 251 m (823 ft)
- Population (2023): 22
  - Density: 2.9/km^{2} (7.5/sq mi)
- Time zone: UTC+01:00 (CET)
  - Summer (DST): UTC+02:00 (CEST)
- INSEE/Postal code: 11223 /11570
- ^{1} French Land Register data, which excludes lakes, ponds, glaciers > 1 km^{2} (0.386 sq mi or 247 acres) and river estuaries.

Mas-des-Cours is a commune in the Aude department in southern France.

== Population ==
Historical population
Year	Pop.	±% p.a.
1968	17	—
1975	19	+1.60%
1982	13	−5.28%
1990	15	+1.80%
1999	17	+1.40%
2007	16	−0.75%
2012	24	+8.45%
2017	25	+0.82%
2023	22	−2.11%
Source: INSEE

== See also ==
- Communes of the Aude department
