= Limoux-Flassian station =

Railway station in Limoux, France

Coordinates: 43°04′06″N 2°13′04″E

Limoux-Flassian is a railway station in Limoux, Occitanie, France. The station is on the Carcassonne–Rivesaltes line. The station is served by TER (local) services operated by the SNCF. The station is just a single platform with a shelter, tickets need to be purchased on the train.

== Train services ==
The following services currently call at Limoux-Flassian:

- local service (TER Occitanie) Carcassonne–Limoux

Preceding station	TER Occitanie	Following station
Pomas towards Carcassonne	29	Limoux Terminus
