= Cavanac =

Commune in Occitanie, France

- Commune
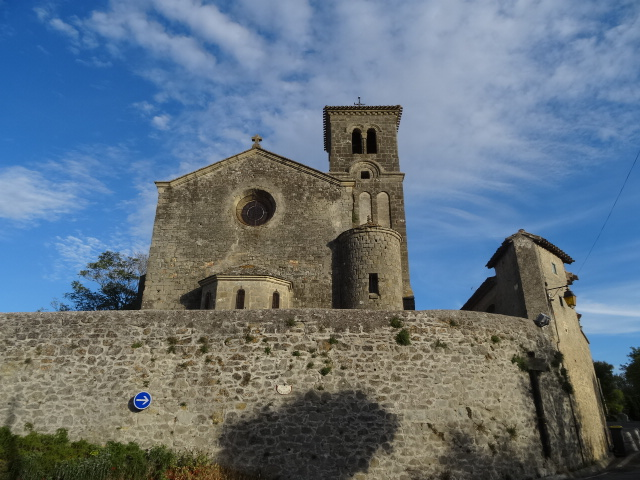
- The church in Cavanac

- Coat of arms
- Location of Cavanac
- Location within France Location within Occitanie
- Coordinates: 43°10′10″N 2°19′38″E
- Country: France
- Region: Occitania
- Department: Aude
- Arrondissement: Carcassonne
- Canton: Carcassonne-2
- Intercommunality: Carcassonne Agglo

Government
  - Mayor (2020–2026): Patrick Schmith
- Area^{1}: 8.98 km^{2} (3.47 sq mi)
- Elevation: 138 m (453 ft)
- Highest elevation: 320 m (1,050 ft)
- Lowest elevation: 109 m (358 ft)
- Population (2023): 1,021
  - Density: 114/km^{2} (294/sq mi)
- Time zone: UTC+01:00 (CET)
  - Summer (DST): UTC+02:00 (CEST)
- INSEE/Postal code: 11085 /11570
- ^{1} French Land Register data, which excludes lakes, ponds, glaciers > 1 km^{2} (0.386 sq mi or 247 acres) and river estuaries.

Cavanac (French pronunciation: [kavanak]) is a commune in the Aude department in southern France.

== Population ==
Historical population
Year	Pop.	±% p.a.
1968	495	—
1975	521	+0.73%
1982	581	+1.57%
1990	676	+1.91%
1999	665	−0.18%
2007	853	+3.16%
2012	918	+1.48%
2017	923	+0.11%
2023	1,021	+1.70%
Source: INSEE

== See also ==
- Communes of the Aude department
