= Verzeille =

Commune in Occitanie, France

- Commune
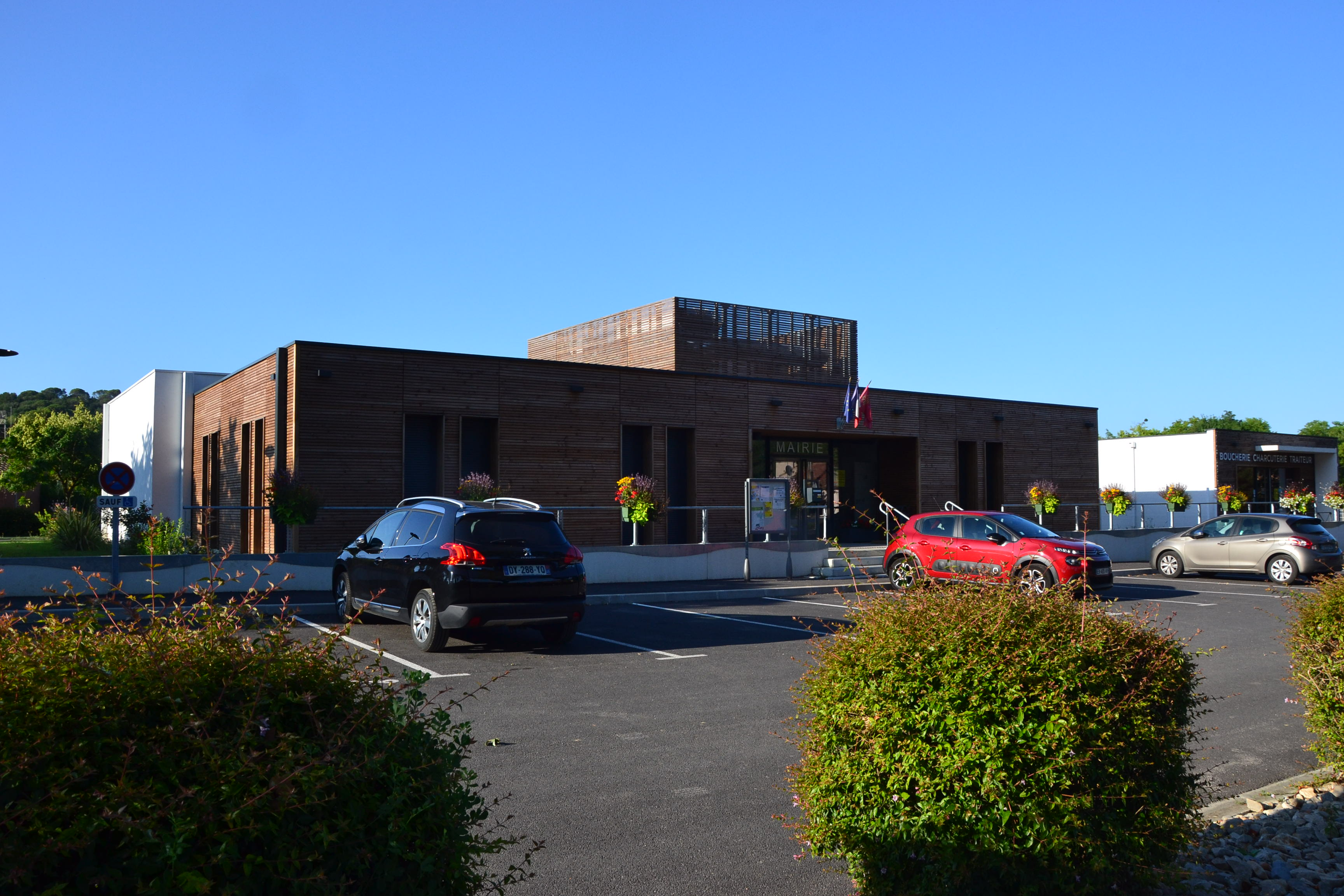
- The town hall in Verzeille

- Coat of arms
- Location of Verzeille
- Location within France Location within Occitanie
- Coordinates: 43°07′37″N 2°19′32″E
- Country: France
- Region: Occitania
- Department: Aude
- Arrondissement: Carcassonne
- Canton: Carcassonne-2
- Intercommunality: Carcassonne Agglo

Government
  - Mayor (2020–2026): Christian Audier
- Area^{1}: 5.21 km^{2} (2.01 sq mi)
- Elevation: 141 m (463 ft)
- Highest elevation: 300 m (980 ft)
- Lowest elevation: 133 m (436 ft)
- Population (2023): 456
  - Density: 87.5/km^{2} (227/sq mi)
- Time zone: UTC+01:00 (CET)
  - Summer (DST): UTC+02:00 (CEST)
- INSEE/Postal code: 11408 /11250
- ^{1} French Land Register data, which excludes lakes, ponds, glaciers > 1 km^{2} (0.386 sq mi or 247 acres) and river estuaries.

Verzeille (French pronunciation: [vɛʁzɛj]; Occitan: Vreselha) is a commune in the Aude department in southern France. Verzeille station has rail connections to Carcassonne and Limoux.

== Population ==
Historical population
Year	Pop.	±% p.a.
1968	297	—
1975	322	+1.16%
1982	341	+0.82%
1990	355	+0.50%
1999	358	+0.09%
2007	420	+2.02%
2012	452	+1.48%
2017	493	+1.75%
2023	456	−1.29%
Source: INSEE

== See also ==
- Communes of the Aude department
