= Leuc =

Commune in Occitanie, France

- Commune
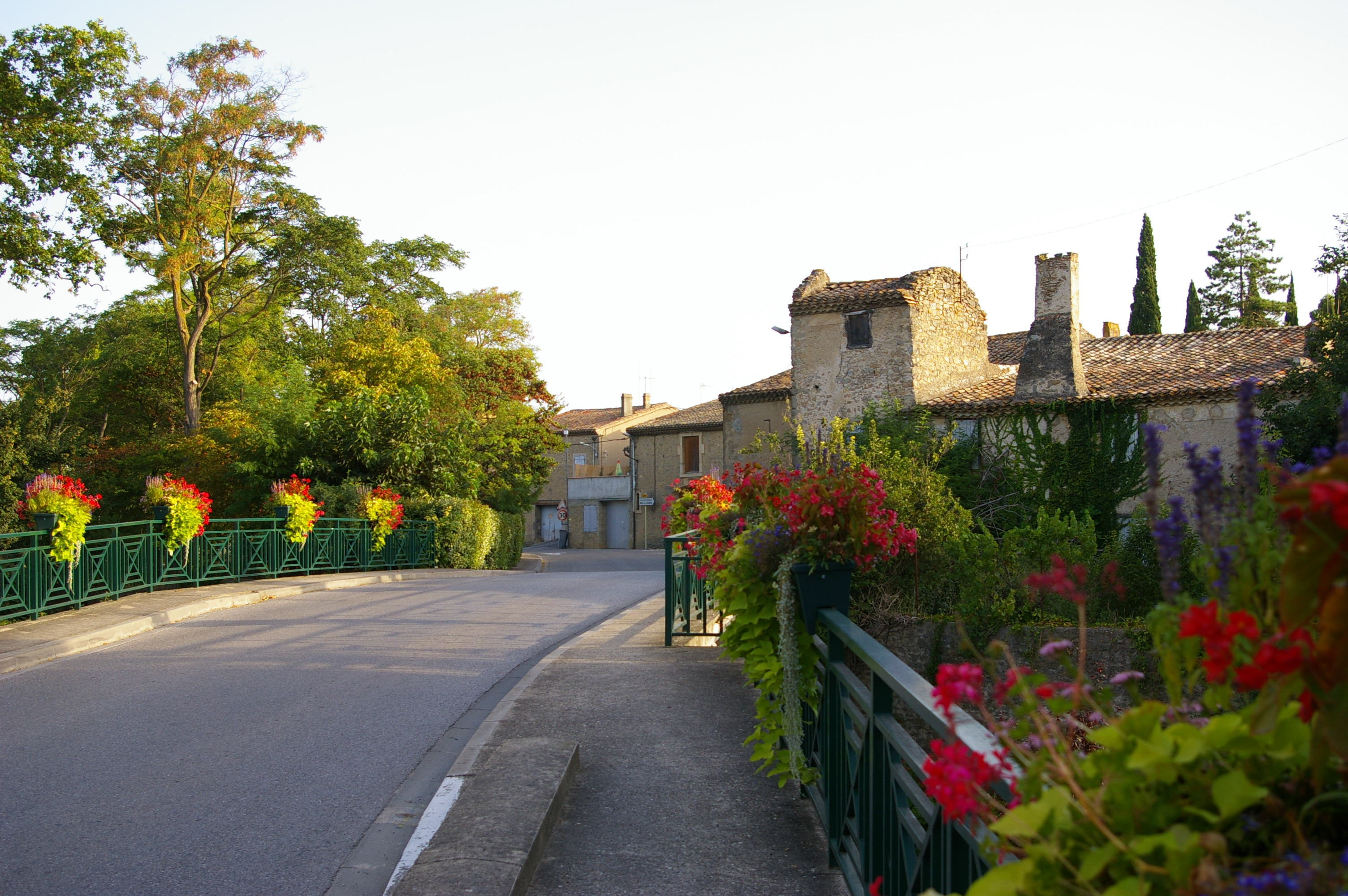
- The Avenue de Carcassonne in Leuc

- Coat of arms
- Location of Leuc
- Location within France Location within Occitanie
- Coordinates: 43°08′50″N 2°19′27″E
- Country: France
- Region: Occitania
- Department: Aude
- Arrondissement: Carcassonne
- Canton: Carcassonne-2
- Intercommunality: Carcassonne Agglo

Government
  - Mayor (2020–2026): Jean-Marie Jordy
- Area^{1}: 11.28 km^{2} (4.36 sq mi)
- Elevation: 130 m (430 ft)
- Highest elevation: 341 m (1,119 ft)
- Lowest elevation: 124 m (407 ft)
- Population (2023): 819
  - Density: 72.6/km^{2} (188/sq mi)
- Time zone: UTC+01:00 (CET)
  - Summer (DST): UTC+02:00 (CEST)
- INSEE/Postal code: 11201 /11250
- ^{1} French Land Register data, which excludes lakes, ponds, glaciers > 1 km^{2} (0.386 sq mi or 247 acres) and river estuaries.

Leuc (French pronunciation: [løk]) is a commune in the Aude department in southern France.

== Population ==
Historical population
| Year | Pop. | ±% p.a. |
|---|---|---|
| 1968 | 427 | — |
| 1975 | 387 | −1.40% |
| 1982 | 529 | +4.57% |
| 1990 | 629 | +2.19% |
| 1999 | 577 | −0.95% |
| 2007 | 627 | +1.04% |
| 2012 | 774 | +4.30% |
| 2017 | 849 | +1.87% |
| 2023 | 819 | −0.60% |
Source: INSEE

== See also ==
- Communes of the Aude department
