= Limoux station =

Railway station in Limoux, France

Coordinates: 43°03′22″N 2°13′21″E

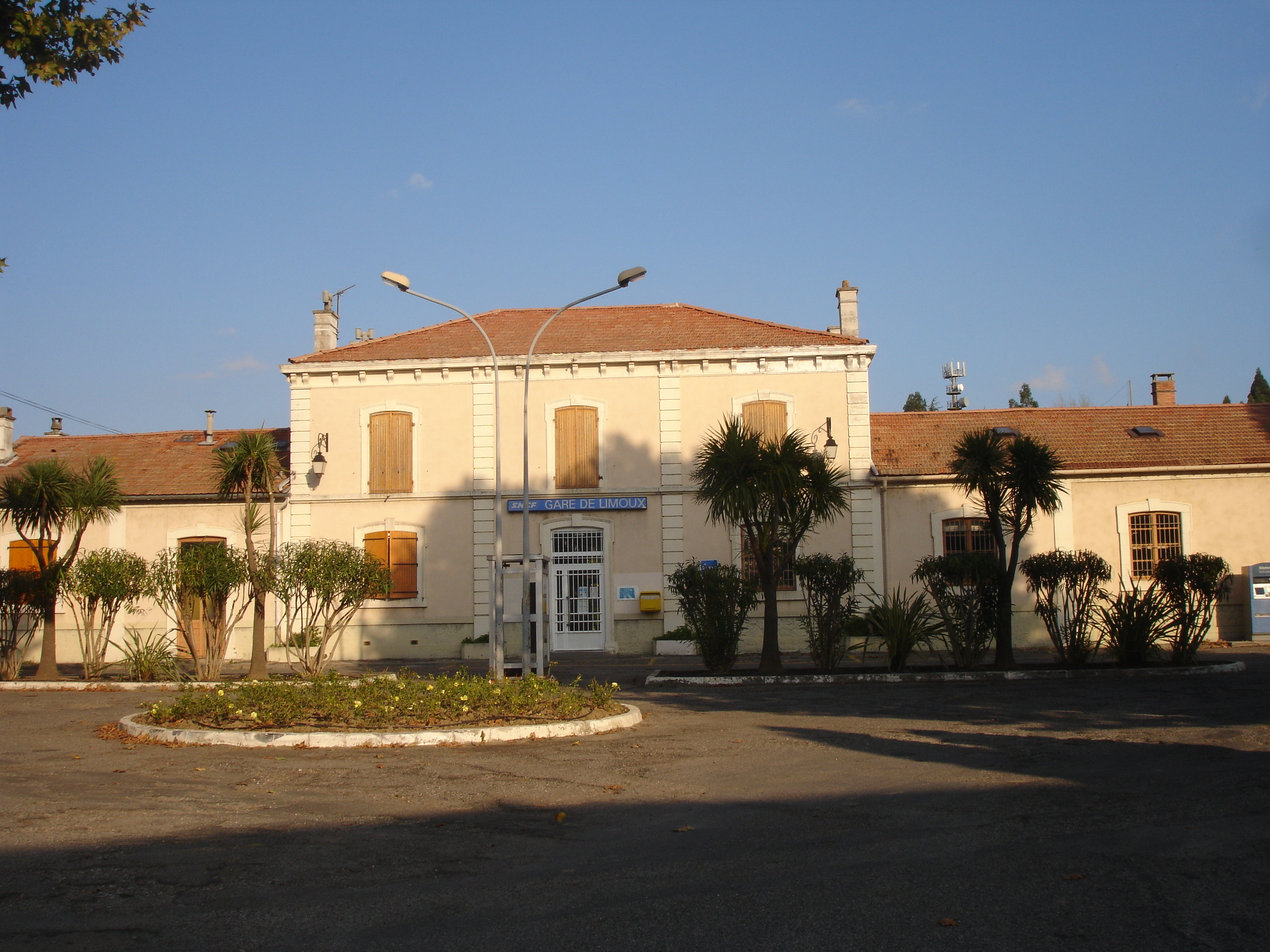
Limoux station entrance

Limoux is a railway station in Limoux, Occitanie, France. It is one of two stations serving the town: the other is Limoux-Flassian.

The station is on the Carcassonne–Rivesaltes line. The station is served by TER (local) services operated by the SNCF. Train services between Limoux and Quillan were suspended in 2018, and are expected to be resumed in 2025.

== Train services ==
The following services currently call at Limoux:

- local service (TER Occitanie) Carcassonne–Limoux

Preceding station	TER Occitanie	Following station
Limoux-Flassian towards Carcassonne	29	Terminus
