= Gondreville, Loiret =

Gondreville
- Commune
- Location of Gondreville
- Location within France Location within Centre-Val de Loire
- Coordinates: 48°03′48″N 2°39′18″E
- Country: France
- Region: Centre-Val de Loire
- Department: Loiret
- Arrondissement: Montargis
- Canton: Courtenay
- Intercommunality: Quatre Vallées

Government
  - Mayor (2024–2026): Philippe Halot
- Area^{1}: 8.07 km^{2} (3.12 sq mi)
- Highest elevation: 281 m (922 ft)
- Lowest elevation: 224 m (735 ft)
- Population (2023): 340
  - Density: 42/km^{2} (110/sq mi)
- Demonym: Gondrevillois
- Time zone: UTC+01:00 (CET)
  - Summer (DST): UTC+02:00 (CEST)
- INSEE/Postal code: 45158 /45490
- ^{1} French Land Register data, which excludes lakes, ponds, glaciers > 1 km^{2} (0.386 sq mi or 247 acres) and river estuaries.

Gondreville (French pronunciation: [ɡɔ̃dʁəvil]) is a commune in the Loiret department in north-central France, located 110 kilometres from Paris.

== Etymology ==
Gondreville (Gondulphi + villa; "farm of Gondulphe") was an old farm from Gallo-Roman times. Historically and in some publications, it has been known as Gondreville la Franche since the mid-seventeenth century, but this name has almost disappeared from everyday speech.

== History ==
Gondreville was part of the canton of Corbeilles from 1793 until 1801 when it became part of the canton of Ferrières-en-Gâtinais. In 2015 it became part of the canton of Courtenay.

== Geography ==
Gondreville is situated in northern-central France, about 110 kilometres south of Paris. The nearest major town is Montargis, located to the southeast of Gondreville. The commune of Corquilleroy lies 5 kilometres to the east and the commune of Mignères lies to the southwest. 3 kilometres to the south is the commune of Pannes and the village of Le Bois-de-Fourche and to the northwest is the hamlet of Le Temple.

Gondreville is 807 hectare in area. It is situated in the Loing basin, between Petit Fusain and the Loing canal.

The centre street of the village of Gondreville, running in a west–east direction, is named Rue Georges Pallain à Montargis ("Street of Georges Pallain of Montargis"). It is named in honor of Georges Pallain (1847–1923), mayor of Gondreville-la-Franche, Governor of the Bank de France, and President of the Société historique & archéologique du Gâtinais,

== Population ==
The village had its population peak in 1946 when 436 people were reported to be living in the commune. Since then, it has declined somewhat, having a population of 340 people in 2023.

Historical population

Year	Pop.	±% p.a.
1793	294	—
1821	284	−0.12%
1846	294	+0.14%
1872	292	−0.03%
1901	309	+0.20%
1926	375	+0.78%
1946	436	+0.76%
1962	348	−1.40%
1968	336	−0.58%

Year	Pop.	±% p.a.
1975	292	−1.99%
1982	320	+1.32%
1990	344	+0.91%
1999	364	+0.63%
2007	372	+0.27%
2012	360	−0.65%
2017	335	−1.43%
2023	340	+0.25%

Source: EHESS and INSEE

== Culture ==
At the end of the 13th century, the Flolin priory hired John of Bagneaux to build a church, L'église de Saint-Loup, for the parish and it became a bright feature of the town. When the old church fell into ruin, it was reconstructed in 1879 in the Gothic style under the auspices of a Mr. Legiund, an architect from Montargis. Built following a cruciform architectural plan, the building has a polygonal apse. There is a stone and brick tower and a gabled wall serves as a base for a porch. The interior contains cross vaults of flat brick and plaster moldings can be seen in the arches. Other features include cul-de-lampe, cantilevered stone protrusions, while the aisles contain two archivolt ogives and chamfered edging. Pilgrims to this church come for the healing of fear and sore legs, and for the preservation of sheep. The church has a reliquary containing the bones of the patron saint, given by the Bishop of Orléans, transported from Orléans to Gondreville on 25 August 1855. The church is also dedicated to Saint Sebastian, martyred in Rome on 20 January 288, and his martyrdom is celebrated in the commune.

The town's single tennis court is located next to the cemetery.

== Transport ==
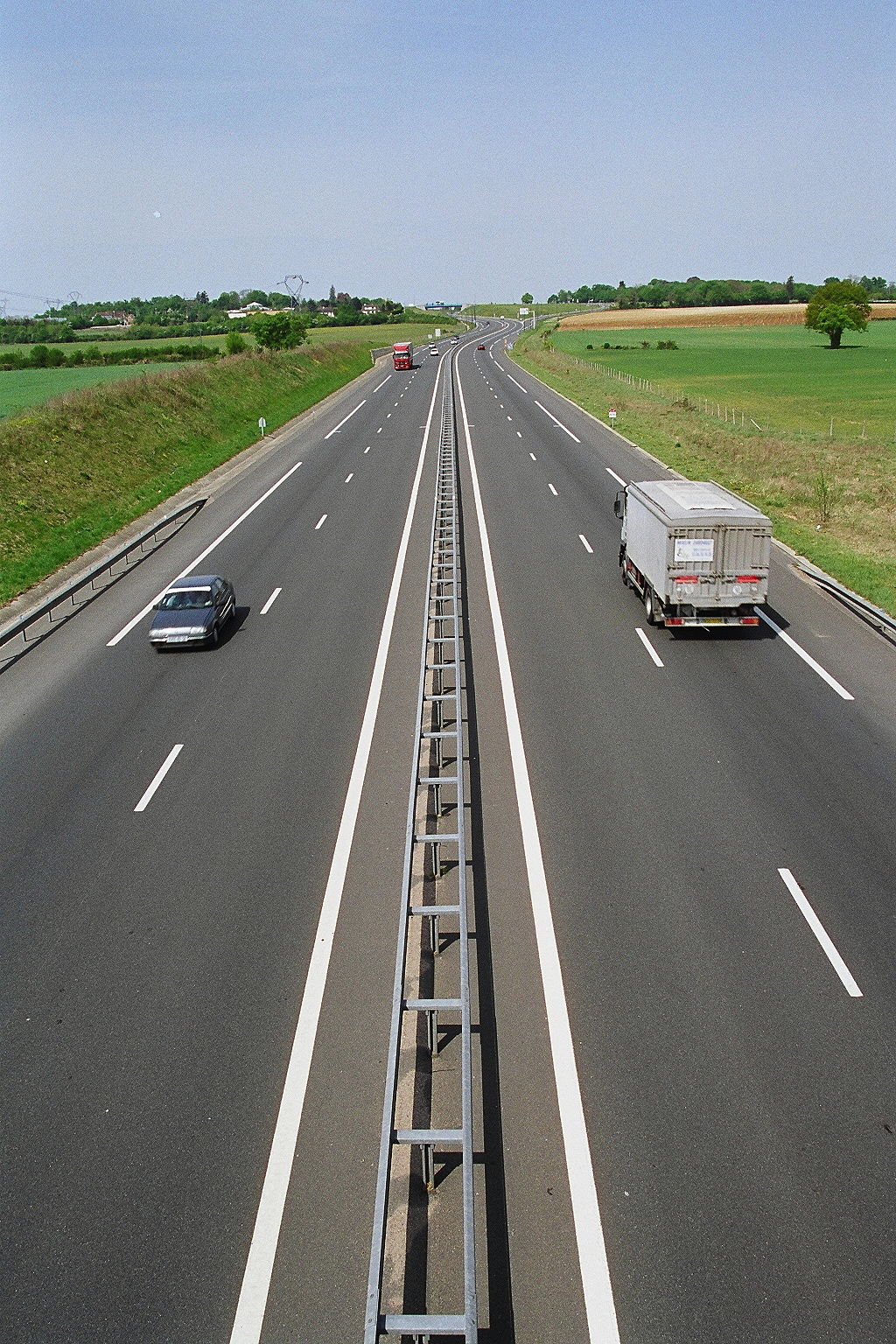
A77 autoroute. Gondreville is located to the west of this highway if travelling north.

The A77 autoroute passes from north–south to the east of the village of Gondrevillage and the A19 autoroute passes from west–east to the north. The A77 joins the A6 autoroute (European route E15) near Lepuy (commune of Chaintreaux) and connects the village to Paris in the north.

== See also ==
- Communes of the Loiret department
