= Arrondissement of Montargis =

Coordinates: 48°00′N 2°44′E

Montargis
- Arrondissement
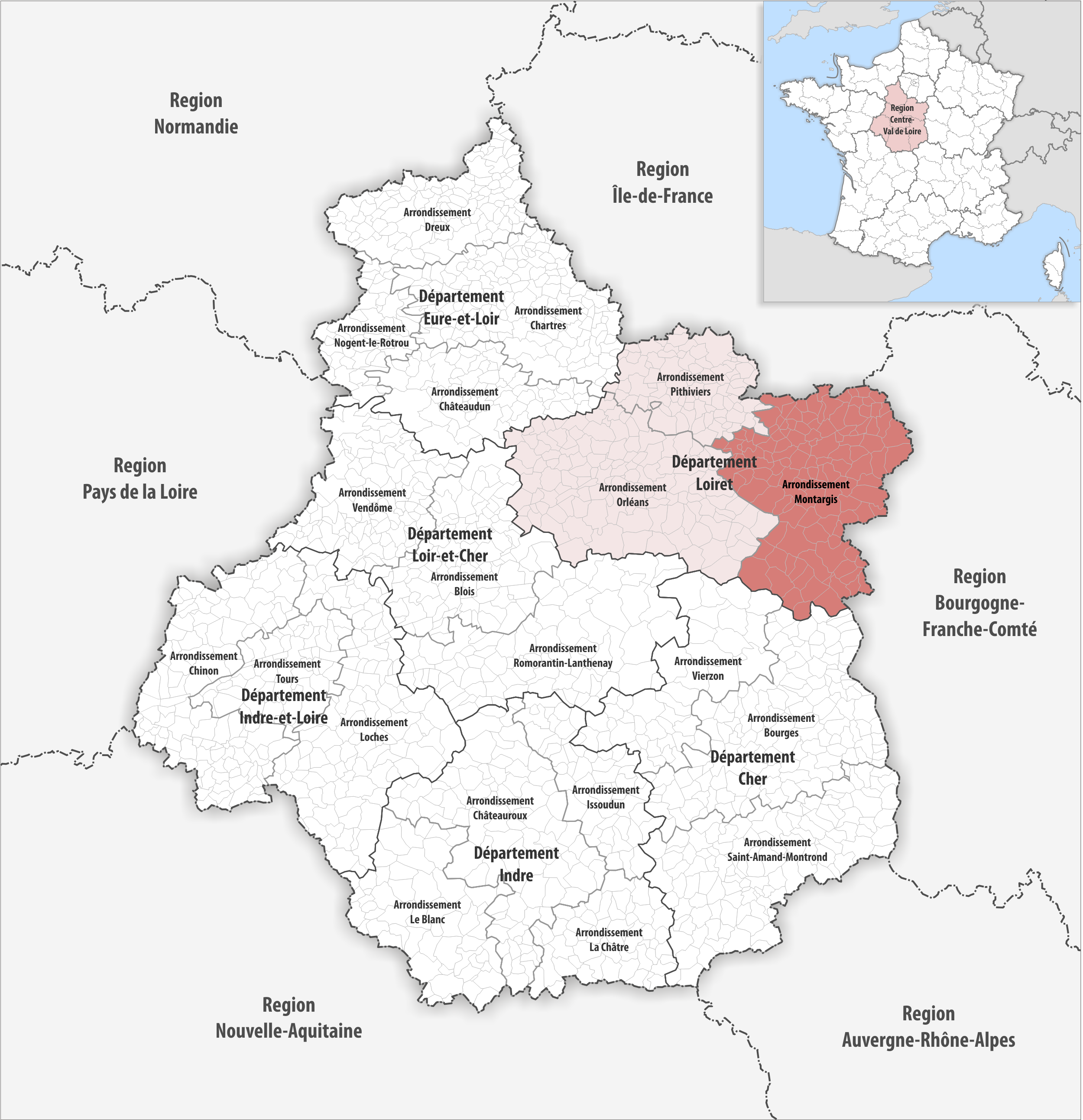
- Location within the region Centre-Val de Loire
- Country: France
- Region: Centre-Val de Loire
- Department: Loiret
- No. of communes: {{{nbcomm}}}
- Area: 2,657.2 km^{2} (1,026.0 sq mi)
- Population (2023): 168,928
  - Density: 63.574/km^{2} (164.66/sq mi)
- INSEE code: 451

The arrondissement of Montargis is an arrondissement of France in the Loiret department in the Centre-Val de Loire region. It has 125 communes. Its population is 168,666 (2021), and its area is 2,657.2 km^{2} (1,026.0 sq mi).

== Composition ==
The communes of the arrondissement of Montargis, and their INSEE codes, are:

1. Adon (45001)
2. Aillant-sur-Milleron (45002)
3. Amilly (45004)
4. Autry-le-Châtel (45016)
5. Auvilliers-en-Gâtinais (45017)
6. Batilly-en-Puisaye (45023)
7. Bazoches-sur-le-Betz (45026)
8. Beauchamps-sur-Huillard (45027)
9. Beaulieu-sur-Loire (45029)
10. Bellegarde (45031)
11. Le Bignon-Mirabeau (45032)
12. Boismorand (45036)
13. Bonny-sur-Loire (45040)
14. Breteau (45052)
15. Briare (45053)
16. La Bussière (45060)
17. Cepoy (45061)
18. Cernoy-en-Berry (45064)
19. Chailly-en-Gâtinais (45066)
20. Châlette-sur-Loing (45068)
21. Champoulet (45070)
22. Chantecoq (45073)
23. La Chapelle-Saint-Sépulcre (45076)
24. La Chapelle-sur-Aveyron (45077)
25. Chapelon (45078)
26. Le Charme (45079)
27. Château-Renard (45083)
28. Châtenoy (45084)
29. Châtillon-Coligny (45085)
30. Châtillon-sur-Loire (45087)
31. Chevannes (45091)
32. Chevillon-sur-Huillard (45092)
33. Chevry-sous-le-Bignon (45094)
34. Les Choux (45096)
35. Chuelles (45097)
36. Conflans-sur-Loing (45102)
37. Corbeilles (45103)
38. Corquilleroy (45104)
39. Cortrat (45105)
40. Coudroy (45107)
41. Coullons (45108)
42. La Cour-Marigny (45112)
43. Courtemaux (45113)
44. Courtempierre (45114)
45. Courtenay (45115)
46. Dammarie-en-Puisaye (45120)
47. Dammarie-sur-Loing (45121)
48. Dordives (45127)
49. Douchy-Montcorbon (45129)
50. Ervauville (45136)
51. Escrignelles (45138)
52. Faverelles (45141)
53. Feins-en-Gâtinais (45143)
54. Ferrières-en-Gâtinais (45145)
55. Fontenay-sur-Loing (45148)
56. Foucherolles (45149)
57. Fréville-du-Gâtinais (45150)
58. Gien (45155)
59. Girolles (45156)
60. Gondreville (45158)
61. Griselles (45161)
62. Gy-les-Nonains (45165)
63. Ladon (45178)
64. Langesse (45180)
65. Lombreuil (45185)
66. Lorris (45187)
67. Louzouer (45189)
68. Melleroy (45199)
69. Mérinville (45201)
70. Mézières-en-Gâtinais (45205)
71. Mignères (45206)
72. Mignerette (45207)
73. Montargis (45208)
74. Montbouy (45210)
75. Montcresson (45212)
76. Montereau (45213)
77. Mormant-sur-Vernisson (45216)
78. Le Moulinet-sur-Solin (45218)
79. Moulon (45219)
80. Nargis (45222)
81. Nesploy (45223)
82. Nevoy (45227)
83. Nogent-sur-Vernisson (45229)
84. Noyers (45230)
85. Ousson-sur-Loire (45238)
86. Oussoy-en-Gâtinais (45239)
87. Ouzouer-des-Champs (45242)
88. Ouzouer-sous-Bellegarde (45243)
89. Ouzouer-sur-Trézée (45245)
90. Pannes (45247)
91. Paucourt (45249)
92. Pers-en-Gâtinais (45250)
93. Pierrefitte-ès-Bois (45251)
94. Poilly-lez-Gien (45254)
95. Préfontaines (45255)
96. Presnoy (45256)
97. Pressigny-les-Pins (45257)
98. Quiers-sur-Bézonde (45259)
99. Rosoy-le-Vieil (45265)
100. Saint-Brisson-sur-Loire (45271)
101. Sainte-Geneviève-des-Bois (45278)
102. Saint-Firmin-des-Bois (45275)
103. Saint-Firmin-sur-Loire (45276)
104. Saint-Germain-des-Prés (45279)
105. Saint-Gondon (45280)
106. Saint-Hilaire-les-Andrésis (45281)
107. Saint-Hilaire-sur-Puiseaux (45283)
108. Saint-Martin-sur-Ocre (45291)
109. Saint-Maurice-sur-Aveyron (45292)
110. Saint-Maurice-sur-Fessard (45293)
111. Sceaux-du-Gâtinais (45303)
112. La Selle-en-Hermoy (45306)
113. La Selle-sur-le-Bied (45307)
114. Solterre (45312)
115. Thimory (45321)
116. Thorailles (45322)
117. Thou (45323)
118. Treilles-en-Gâtinais (45328)
119. Triguères (45329)
120. Varennes-Changy (45332)
121. Vieilles-Maisons-sur-Joudry (45334)
122. Villemandeur (45338)
123. Villemoutiers (45339)
124. Villevoques (45343)
125. Vimory (45345)

== History ==
The arrondissement of Montargis was created in 1800.

As a result of the reorganisation of the cantons of France which came into effect in 2015, the borders of the cantons are no longer related to the borders of the arrondissements. The cantons of the arrondissement of Montargis were, as of January 2015:

1. Amilly
2. Bellegarde
3. Briare
4. Châlette-sur-Loing
5. Château-Renard
6. Châtillon-Coligny
7. Châtillon-sur-Loire
8. Courtenay
9. Ferrières-en-Gâtinais
10. Gien
11. Lorris
12. Montargis
