= Chevry-sous-le-Bignon =

- Commune
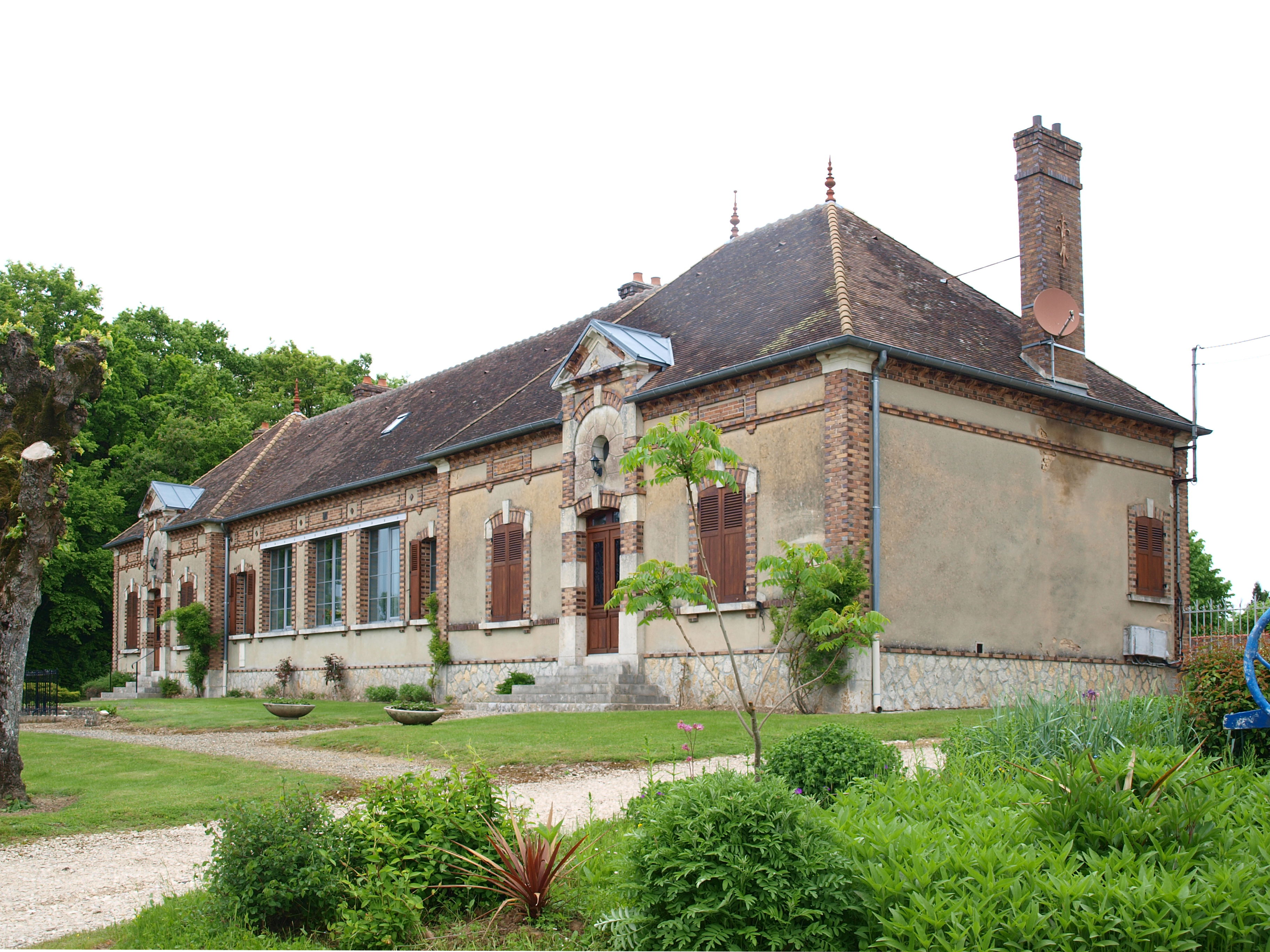
- The town hall in Chevry-sous-le-Bignon
- Location of Chevry-sous-le-Bignon
- Location within France Location within Centre-Val de Loire
- Coordinates: 48°08′30″N 2°53′53″E
- Country: France
- Region: Centre-Val de Loire
- Department: Loiret
- Arrondissement: Montargis
- Canton: Courtenay
- Intercommunality: CC des Quatre Vallées

Government
  - Mayor (2020–2026): Karine Rodriguez
- Area^{1}: 7.40 km^{2} (2.86 sq mi)
- Highest elevation: 133 m (436 ft)
- Lowest elevation: 97 m (318 ft)
- Population (2023): 226
  - Density: 30.5/km^{2} (79.1/sq mi)
- Demonym: Chevriots
- Time zone: UTC+01:00 (CET)
  - Summer (DST): UTC+02:00 (CEST)
- INSEE/Postal code: 45094 /45210
- ^{1} French Land Register data, which excludes lakes, ponds, glaciers > 1 km^{2} (0.386 sq mi or 247 acres) and river estuaries.

Chevry-sous-le-Bignon (French pronunciation: [ʃəvʁi su lə biɲɔ̃], literally Chevry under Le Bignon) is a commune in the Loiret department in north-central France.

== See also ==
- Communes of the Loiret department
