= Corbeilles =

- Commune
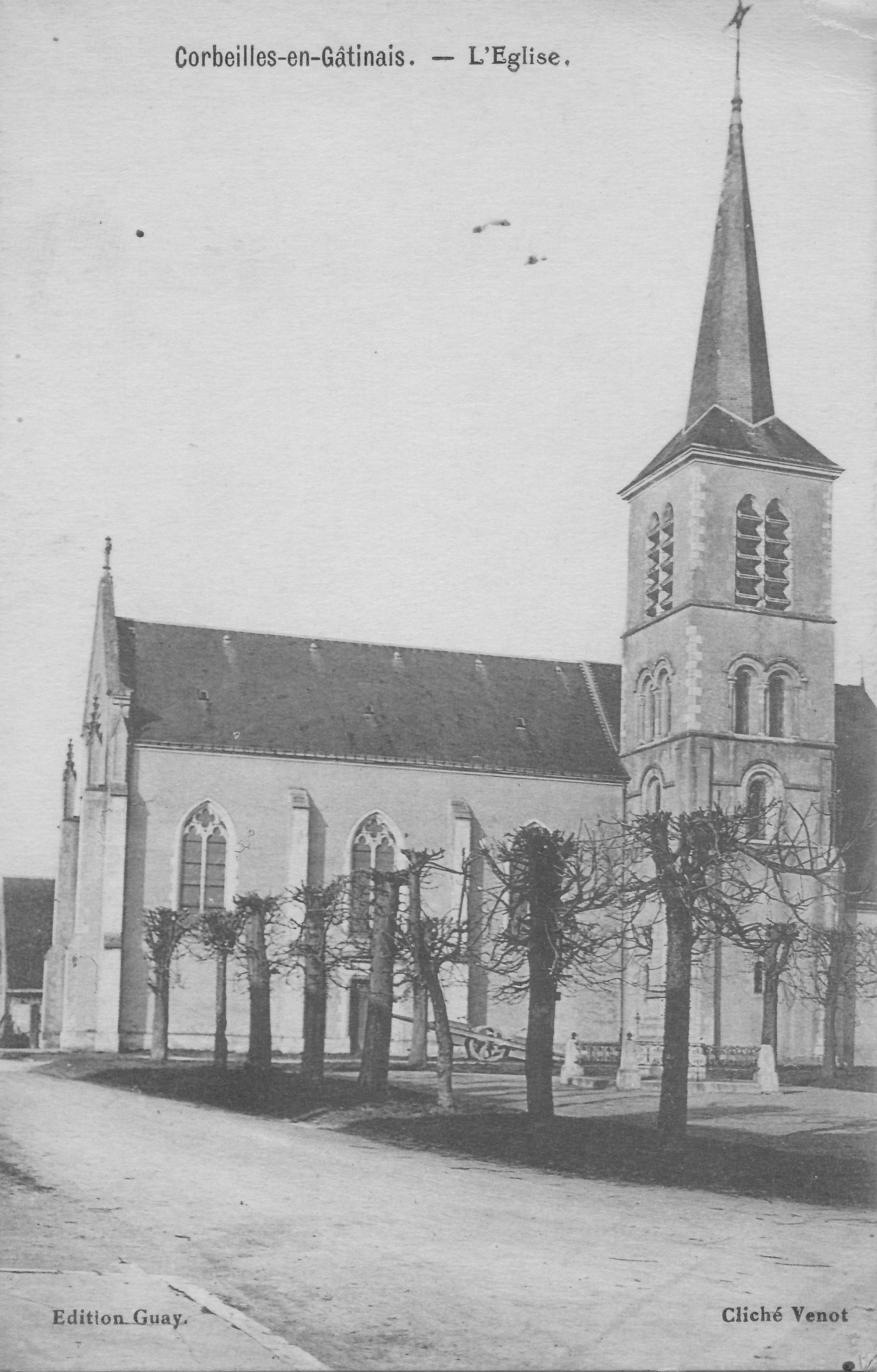
- The church in Corbeilles in 1939

- Coat of arms
- Location of Corbeilles
- Location within France Location within Centre-Val de Loire
- Coordinates: 48°04′23″N 2°33′00″E
- Country: France
- Region: Centre-Val de Loire
- Department: Loiret
- Arrondissement: Montargis
- Canton: Courtenay
- Intercommunality: CC des Quatre Vallées

Government
  - Mayor (2020–2026): Françoise Bernard
- Area^{1}: 32.62 km^{2} (12.59 sq mi)
- Highest elevation: 96 m (315 ft)
- Lowest elevation: 79 m (259 ft)
- Population (2023): 1,548
  - Density: 47.46/km^{2} (122.9/sq mi)
- Demonym: Corbeillois
- Time zone: UTC+01:00 (CET)
  - Summer (DST): UTC+02:00 (CEST)
- INSEE/Postal code: 45103 /45490
- ^{1} French Land Register data, which excludes lakes, ponds, glaciers > 1 km^{2} (0.386 sq mi or 247 acres) and river estuaries.

Corbeilles (French pronunciation: [kɔʁbɛj]; also known as Corbeilles-en-Gâtinais) is a commune in the Loiret department in north-central France.

== See also ==
- Communes of the Loiret department
