= Mignerette =

- Commune
- Coat of arms
- Location of Mignerette
- Location within France Location within Centre-Val de Loire
- Coordinates: 48°03′21″N 2°36′05″E
- Country: France
- Region: Centre-Val de Loire
- Department: Loiret
- Arrondissement: Montargis
- Canton: Courtenay
- Intercommunality: Quatre Vallées

Government
  - Mayor (2020–2026): Joël Facy
- Area^{1}: 6.21 km^{2} (2.40 sq mi)
- Highest elevation: 93 m (305 ft)
- Lowest elevation: 81 m (266 ft)
- Population (2023): 350
  - Density: 56/km^{2} (150/sq mi)
- Demonym: Mignerettois
- Time zone: UTC+01:00 (CET)
  - Summer (DST): UTC+02:00 (CEST)
- INSEE/Postal code: 45207 /45490
- ^{1} French Land Register data, which excludes lakes, ponds, glaciers > 1 km^{2} (0.386 sq mi or 247 acres) and river estuaries.

Mignerette (French pronunciation: [miɲʁɛt]) is a commune in the Loiret department in north-central France.

== See also ==
- Communes of the Loiret department
