= Chuelles =

- Commune
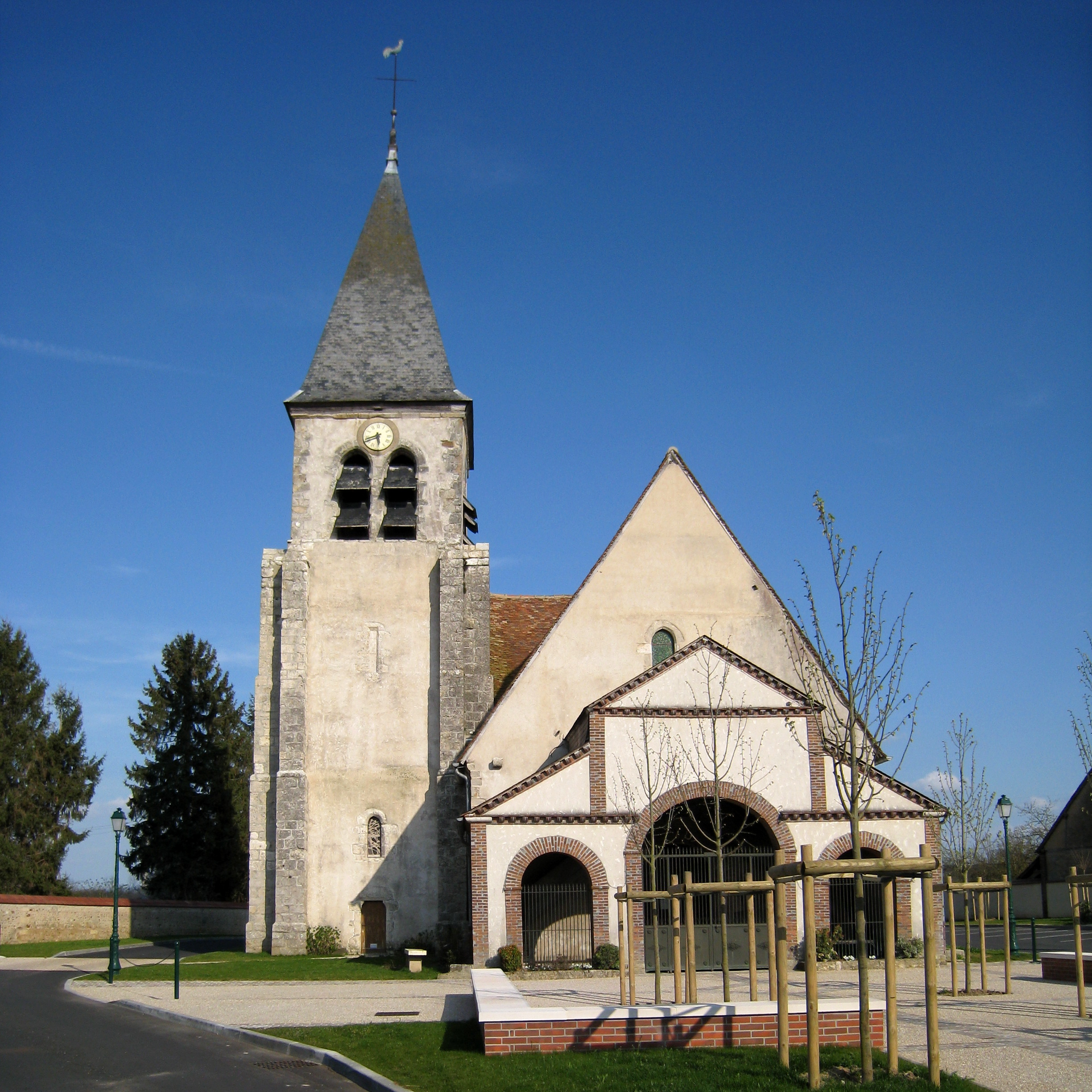
- The church in Chuelles

- Coat of arms
- Location of Chuelles
- Location within France Location within Centre-Val de Loire
- Coordinates: 48°00′13″N 2°57′59″E
- Country: France
- Region: Centre-Val de Loire
- Department: Loiret
- Arrondissement: Montargis
- Canton: Courtenay

Government
  - Mayor (2020–2026): Stéphane Hamon
- Area^{1}: 30.82 km^{2} (11.90 sq mi)
- Highest elevation: 181 m (594 ft)
- Lowest elevation: 138 m (453 ft)
- Population (2023): 1,237
  - Density: 40.14/km^{2} (104.0/sq mi)
- Time zone: UTC+01:00 (CET)
  - Summer (DST): UTC+02:00 (CEST)
- INSEE/Postal code: 45097 /45220
- ^{1} French Land Register data, which excludes lakes, ponds, glaciers > 1 km^{2} (0.386 sq mi or 247 acres) and river estuaries.

Chuelles (French pronunciation: [ʃɥɛl]) is a commune in the Loiret department in north-central France.

== See also ==
- Communes of the Loiret department
