= Girolles, Loiret =

Girolles
- Commune
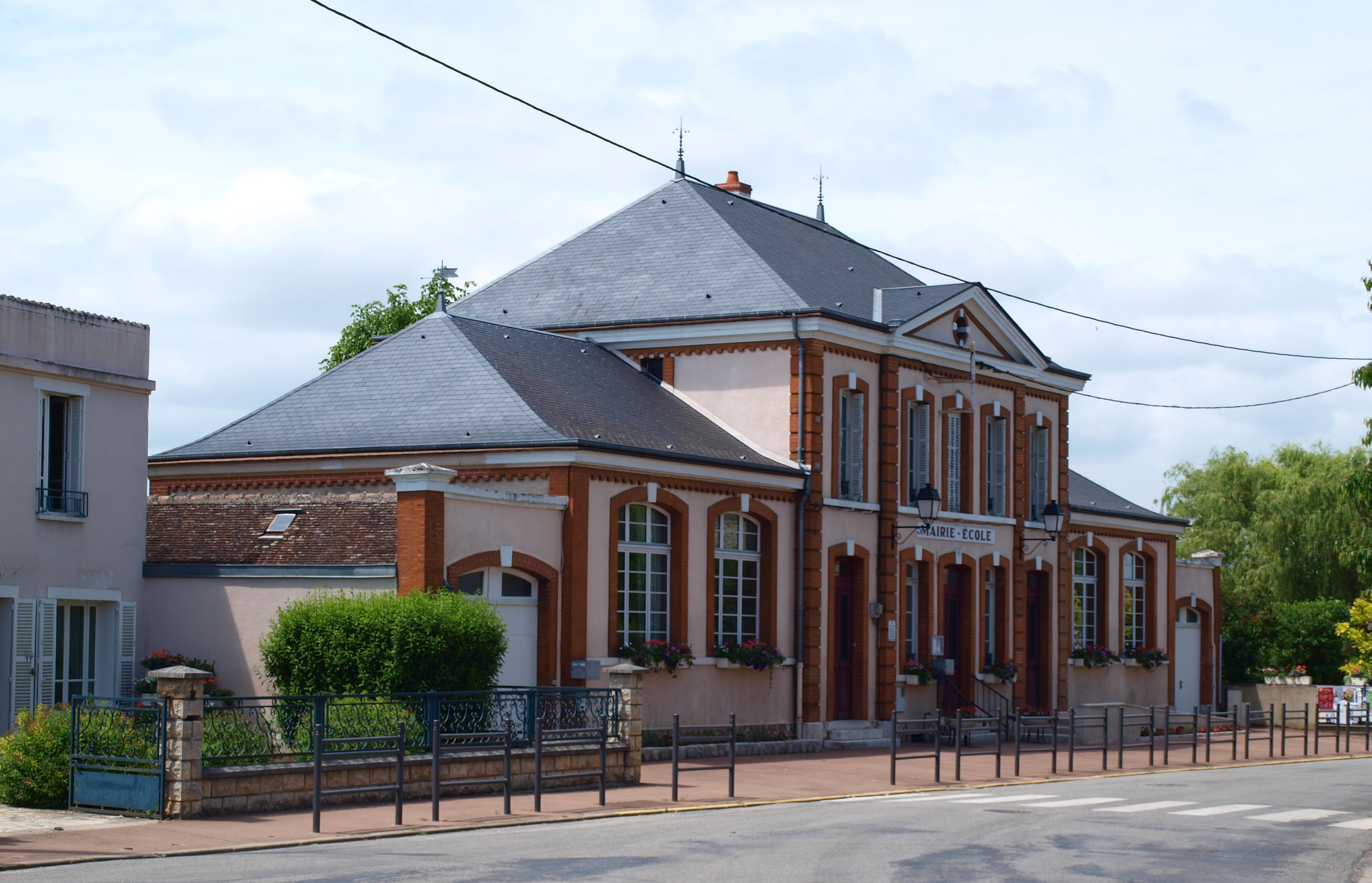
- The town hall and school in Girolles
- Location of Girolles
- Location within France Location within Centre-Val de Loire
- Coordinates: 48°03′41″N 2°42′57″E
- Country: France
- Region: Centre-Val de Loire
- Department: Loiret
- Arrondissement: Montargis
- Canton: Courtenay
- Intercommunality: Quatre Vallées

Government
  - Mayor (2020–2026): Pascal Drouin
- Area^{1}: 13.9 km^{2} (5.4 sq mi)
- Highest elevation: 104 m (341 ft)
- Lowest elevation: 76 m (249 ft)
- Population (2023): 596
  - Density: 42.9/km^{2} (111/sq mi)
- Time zone: UTC+01:00 (CET)
  - Summer (DST): UTC+02:00 (CEST)
- INSEE/Postal code: 45156 /45120
- ^{1} French Land Register data, which excludes lakes, ponds, glaciers > 1 km^{2} (0.386 sq mi or 247 acres) and river estuaries.

Girolles (French pronunciation: [ʒiʁɔl]) is a commune in the Loiret department in north-central France.

== See also ==
- Communes of the Loiret department
