= Thorailles =

- Commune
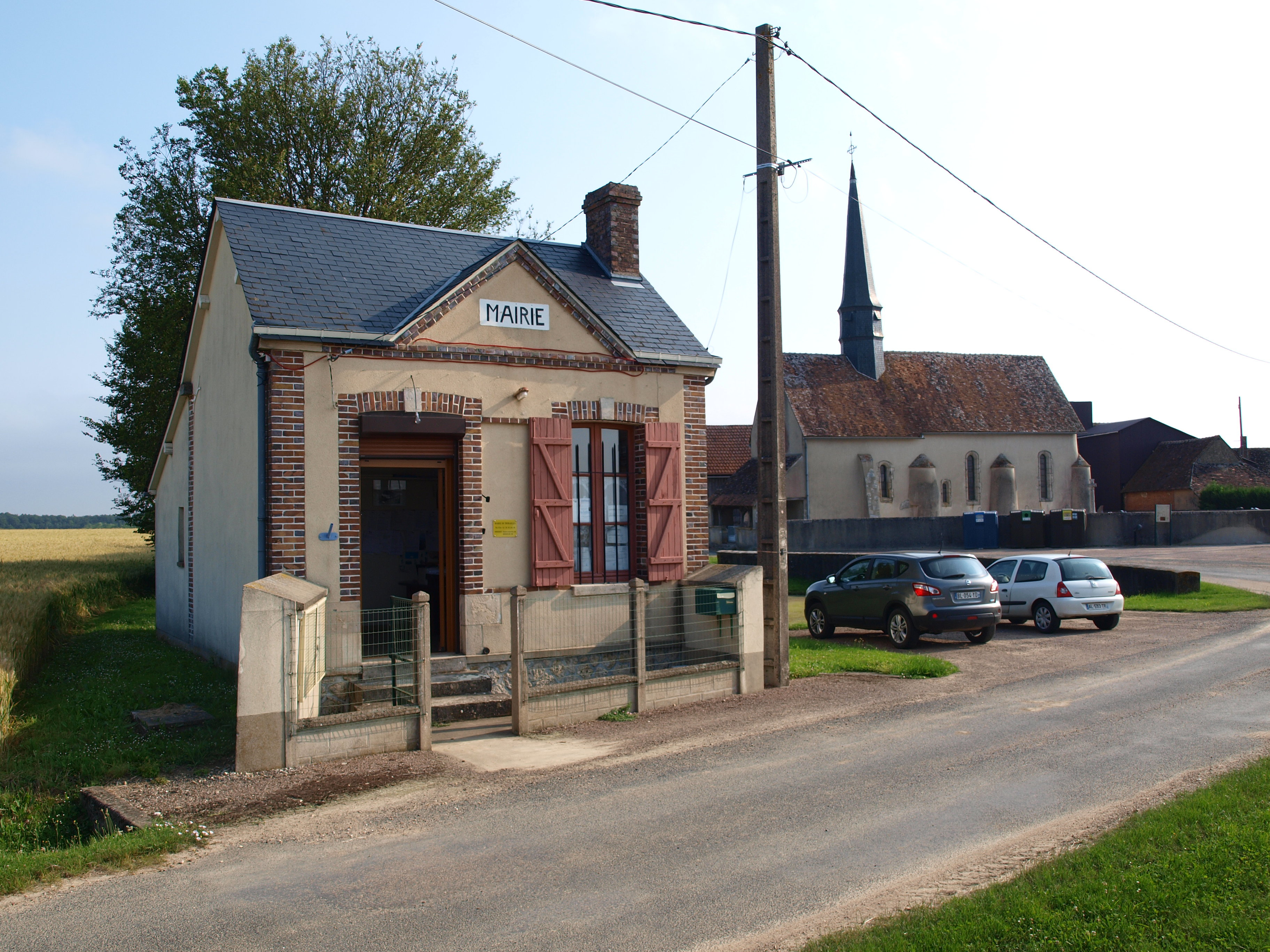
- The town hall and church in Thorailles

- Coat of arms
- Location of Thorailles
- Location within France Location within Centre-Val de Loire
- Coordinates: 48°01′27″N 2°53′56″E
- Country: France
- Region: Centre-Val de Loire
- Department: Loiret
- Arrondissement: Montargis
- Canton: Courtenay

Government
  - Mayor (2020–2026): Nathalie Lucas
- Area^{1}: 3.45 km^{2} (1.33 sq mi)
- Highest elevation: 144 m (472 ft)
- Lowest elevation: 128 m (420 ft)
- Population (2023): 201
  - Density: 58.3/km^{2} (151/sq mi)
- Time zone: UTC+01:00 (CET)
  - Summer (DST): UTC+02:00 (CEST)
- INSEE/Postal code: 45322 /45210
- ^{1} French Land Register data, which excludes lakes, ponds, glaciers > 1 km^{2} (0.386 sq mi or 247 acres) and river estuaries.

Thorailles (French pronunciation: [tɔʁaj]) is a commune in the Loiret department in north-central France. It is around 12 km east of Montargis and 100 km south of the centre of Paris.

== See also ==
- Communes of the Loiret department
