= Saint-Hilaire-les-Andrésis =

- Commune
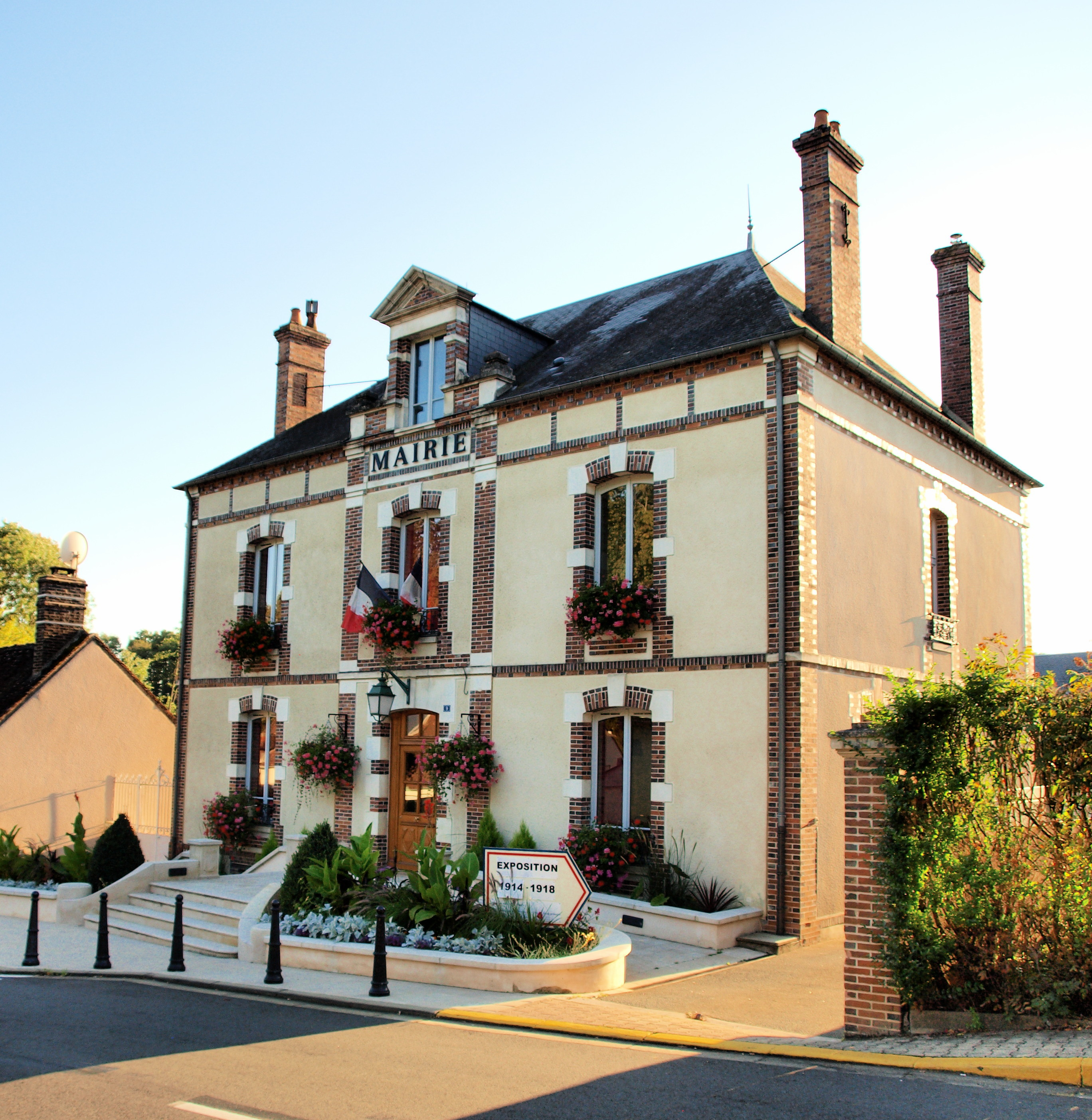
- The town hall in Saint-Hilaire-les-Andrésis

- Coat of arms
- Location of Saint-Hilaire-les-Andrésis
- Location within France Location within Centre-Val de Loire
- Coordinates: 48°03′15″N 3°00′49″E
- Country: France
- Region: Centre-Val de Loire
- Department: Loiret
- Arrondissement: Montargis
- Canton: Courtenay

Government
  - Mayor (2020–2026): Christophe Gaudy
- Area^{1}: 25.71 km^{2} (9.93 sq mi)
- Elevation: 142 m (466 ft)
- Highest elevation: 177 m (581 ft)
- Lowest elevation: 123 m (404 ft)
- Population (2023): 952
  - Density: 37.0/km^{2} (95.9/sq mi)
- Time zone: UTC+01:00 (CET)
  - Summer (DST): UTC+02:00 (CEST)
- INSEE/Postal code: 45281 /45320
- ^{1} French Land Register data, which excludes lakes, ponds, glaciers > 1 km^{2} (0.386 sq mi or 247 acres) and river estuaries.

Saint-Hilaire-les-Andrésis (French pronunciation: [sɛ̃.t‿ilɛʁ le.z‿ɑ̃dʁezi]) is a commune in the Loiret department in north-central France.

== See also ==
- Communes of the Loiret department
