= Villevoques =

- Commune
- Location of Villevoques
- Location within France Location within Centre-Val de Loire
- Coordinates: 48°01′49″N 2°37′40″E
- Country: France
- Region: Centre-Val de Loire
- Department: Loiret
- Arrondissement: Montargis
- Canton: Courtenay
- Intercommunality: Quatre Vallées

Government
  - Mayor (2020–2026): Chantal Lamige-Roche
- Area^{1}: 5.06 km^{2} (1.95 sq mi)
- Highest elevation: 114 m (374 ft)
- Lowest elevation: 88 m (289 ft)
- Population (2023): 191
  - Density: 37.7/km^{2} (97.8/sq mi)
- Time zone: UTC+01:00 (CET)
  - Summer (DST): UTC+02:00 (CEST)
- INSEE/Postal code: 45343 /45700
- ^{1} French Land Register data, which excludes lakes, ponds, glaciers > 1 km^{2} (0.386 sq mi or 247 acres) and river estuaries.

Villevoques (French pronunciation: [vilvɔk]) is a commune in the Loiret department in north-central France.

== See also ==
- Communes of the Loiret department
