= Rozoy-le-Vieil =

- Commune
- Coat of arms
- Location of Rozoy-le-Vieil
- Location within France Location within Centre-Val de Loire
- Coordinates: 48°07′30″N 2°56′47″E
- Country: France
- Region: Centre-Val de Loire
- Department: Loiret
- Arrondissement: Montargis
- Canton: Courtenay

Government
  - Mayor (2020–2026): Jacques Huc
- Area^{1}: 8.14 km^{2} (3.14 sq mi)
- Highest elevation: 147 m (482 ft)
- Lowest elevation: 118 m (387 ft)
- Population (2023): 393
  - Density: 48.3/km^{2} (125/sq mi)
- Demonym: Rozetains
- Time zone: UTC+01:00 (CET)
  - Summer (DST): UTC+02:00 (CEST)
- INSEE/Postal code: 45265 /45210
- Website: www.rozoy-le-vieil.fr
- ^{1} French Land Register data, which excludes lakes, ponds, glaciers > 1 km^{2} (0.386 sq mi or 247 acres) and river estuaries.

Rozoy-le-Vieil (French pronunciation: [ʁozwa lə vjɛj]) is a commune in the Loiret department in north-central France.

== See also ==
- Communes of the Loiret department
