= Pers-en-Gâtinais =

- Commune
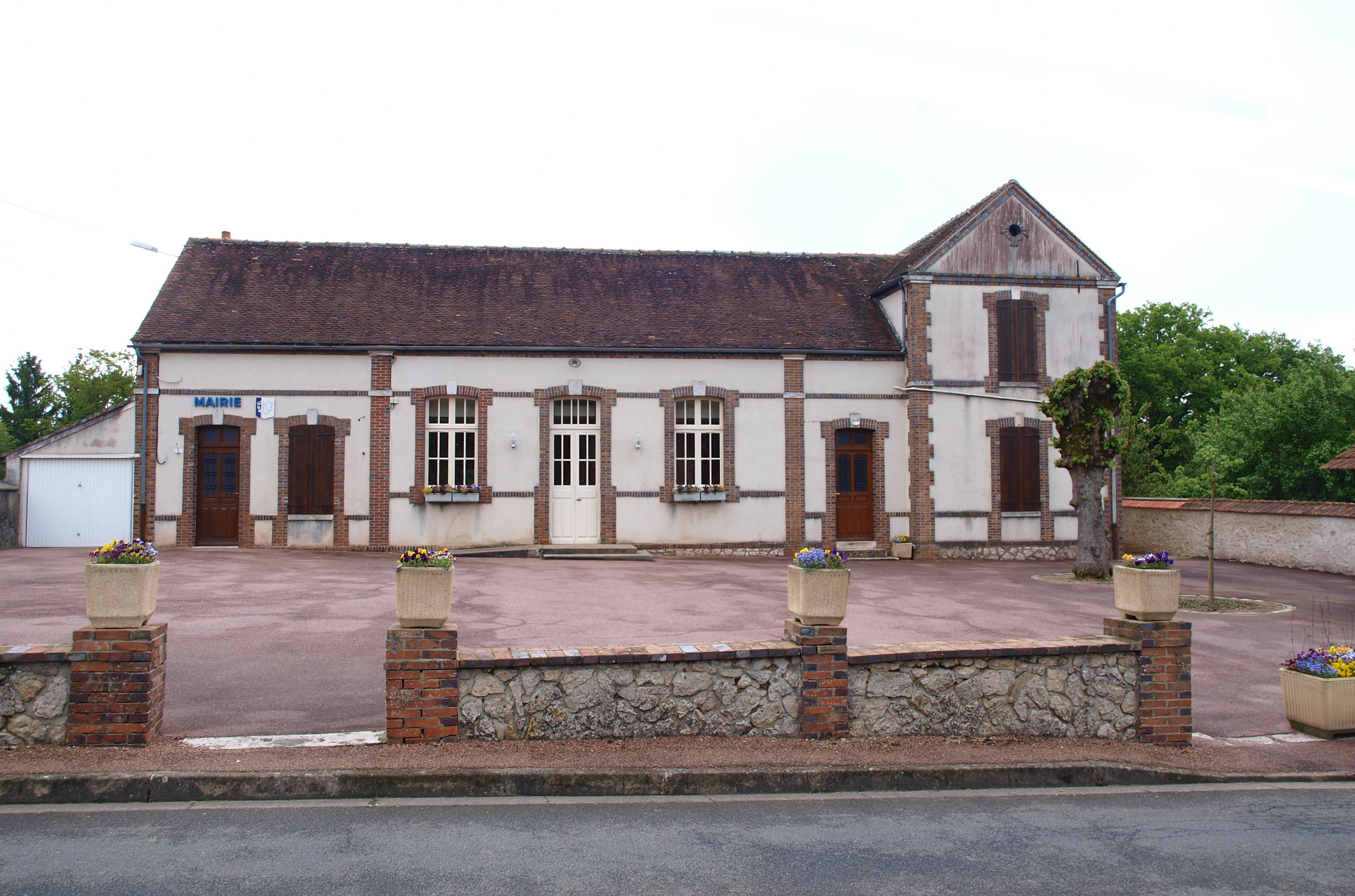
- The town hall in Pers-en-Gâtinais
- Location of Pers-en-Gâtinais
- Location within France Location within Centre-Val de Loire
- Coordinates: 48°07′10″N 2°54′19″E
- Country: France
- Region: Centre-Val de Loire
- Department: Loiret
- Arrondissement: Montargis
- Canton: Courtenay

Government
  - Mayor (2020–2026): Jean-Luc Chevalier
- Area^{1}: 10.69 km^{2} (4.13 sq mi)
- Highest elevation: 137 m (449 ft)
- Lowest elevation: 105 m (344 ft)
- Population (2023): 239
  - Density: 22.4/km^{2} (57.9/sq mi)
- Time zone: UTC+01:00 (CET)
  - Summer (DST): UTC+02:00 (CEST)
- INSEE/Postal code: 45250 /45210
- ^{1} French Land Register data, which excludes lakes, ponds, glaciers > 1 km^{2} (0.386 sq mi or 247 acres) and river estuaries.

Pers-en-Gâtinais is a commune in the Loiret department in north-central France.

== See also ==
- Communes of the Loiret department
