= Sceaux-du-Gâtinais =

- Commune
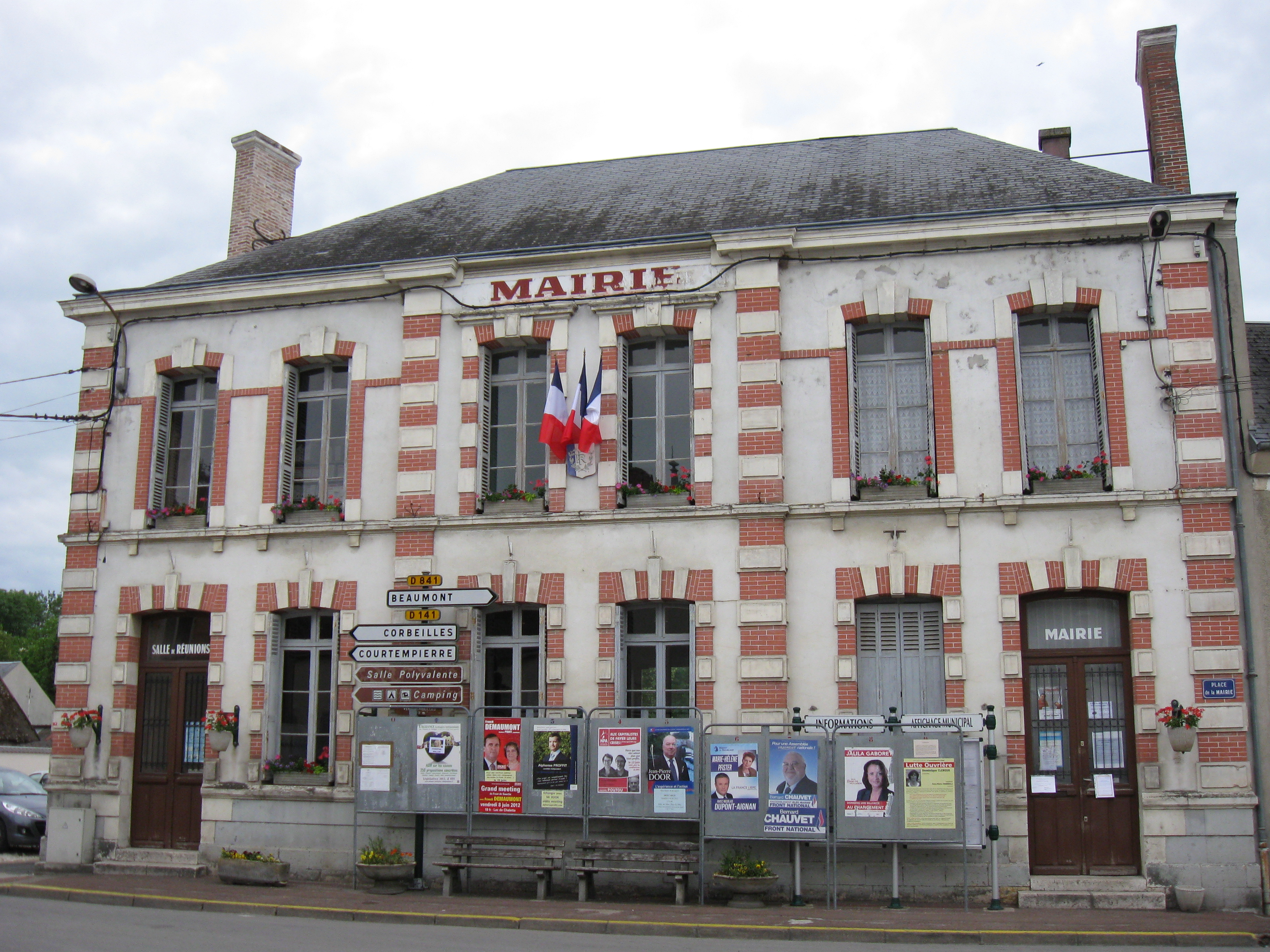
- The town hall in Sceaux-du-Gâtinais
- Location of Sceaux-du-Gâtinais
- Location within France Location within Centre-Val de Loire
- Coordinates: 48°06′18″N 2°35′50″E
- Country: France
- Region: Centre-Val de Loire
- Department: Loiret
- Arrondissement: Montargis
- Canton: Courtenay
- Intercommunality: Quatre Vallées

Government
  - Mayor (2020–2026): Céline Gadois
- Area^{1}: 31.72 km^{2} (12.25 sq mi)
- Highest elevation: 101 m (331 ft)
- Lowest elevation: 77 m (253 ft)
- Population (2023): 606
  - Density: 19.1/km^{2} (49.5/sq mi)
- Demonym(s): scéléens, scéléennes
- Time zone: UTC+01:00 (CET)
  - Summer (DST): UTC+02:00 (CEST)
- INSEE/Postal code: 45303 /45490
- ^{1} French Land Register data, which excludes lakes, ponds, glaciers > 1 km^{2} (0.386 sq mi or 247 acres) and river estuaries.

Sceaux-du-Gâtinais (French pronunciation: [so dy ɡɑtinɛ]; literally "Sceaux of the Gâtinais") is a commune in the Loiret department in north-central France.

== See also ==
- Communes of the Loiret department
