= Treilles-en-Gâtinais =

- Commune
- Location of Treilles-en-Gâtinais
- Location within France Location within Centre-Val de Loire
- Coordinates: 48°04′43″N 2°39′37″E
- Country: France
- Region: Centre-Val de Loire
- Department: Loiret
- Arrondissement: Montargis
- Canton: Courtenay
- Intercommunality: Quatre Vallées

Government
  - Mayor (2020–2026): Françoise Woehrlé
- Area^{1}: 13.97 km^{2} (5.39 sq mi)
- Highest elevation: 98 m (322 ft)
- Lowest elevation: 85 m (279 ft)
- Population (2023): 296
  - Density: 21.2/km^{2} (54.9/sq mi)
- Time zone: UTC+01:00 (CET)
  - Summer (DST): UTC+02:00 (CEST)
- INSEE/Postal code: 45328 /45490
- ^{1} French Land Register data, which excludes lakes, ponds, glaciers > 1 km^{2} (0.386 sq mi or 247 acres) and river estuaries.

Treilles-en-Gâtinais (French pronunciation: [tʁɛj ɑ̃ ɡɑtinɛ]; literally "Treilles in Gâtinais") is a commune in the Loiret department in north-central France.

== See also ==
- Communes of the Loiret department
