= Louzouer =

- Commune
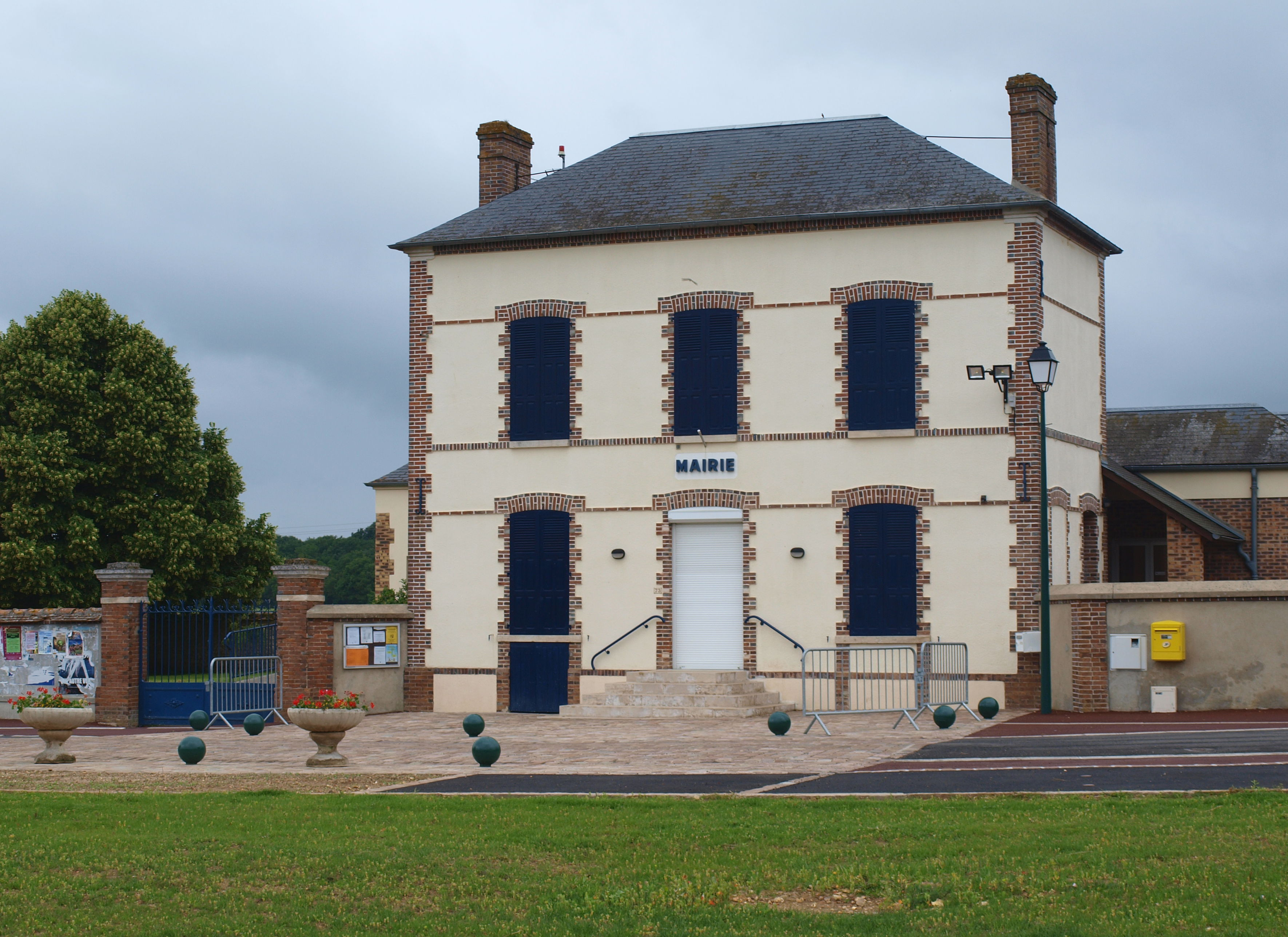
- The town hall in Louzouer
- Location of Louzouer
- Location within France Location within Centre-Val de Loire
- Coordinates: 48°02′20″N 2°52′56″E
- Country: France
- Region: Centre-Val de Loire
- Department: Loiret
- Arrondissement: Montargis
- Canton: Courtenay

Government
  - Mayor (2020–2026): Serge Piat
- Area^{1}: 11.23 km^{2} (4.34 sq mi)
- Highest elevation: 138 m (453 ft)
- Lowest elevation: 112 m (367 ft)
- Population (2023): 247
  - Density: 22.0/km^{2} (57.0/sq mi)
- Time zone: UTC+01:00 (CET)
  - Summer (DST): UTC+02:00 (CEST)
- INSEE/Postal code: 45189 /45210
- ^{1} French Land Register data, which excludes lakes, ponds, glaciers > 1 km^{2} (0.386 sq mi or 247 acres) and river estuaries.

Louzouer is a commune in the Loiret department in north-central France.

== See also ==
- Communes of the Loiret department
