= Melleroy =

- Commune
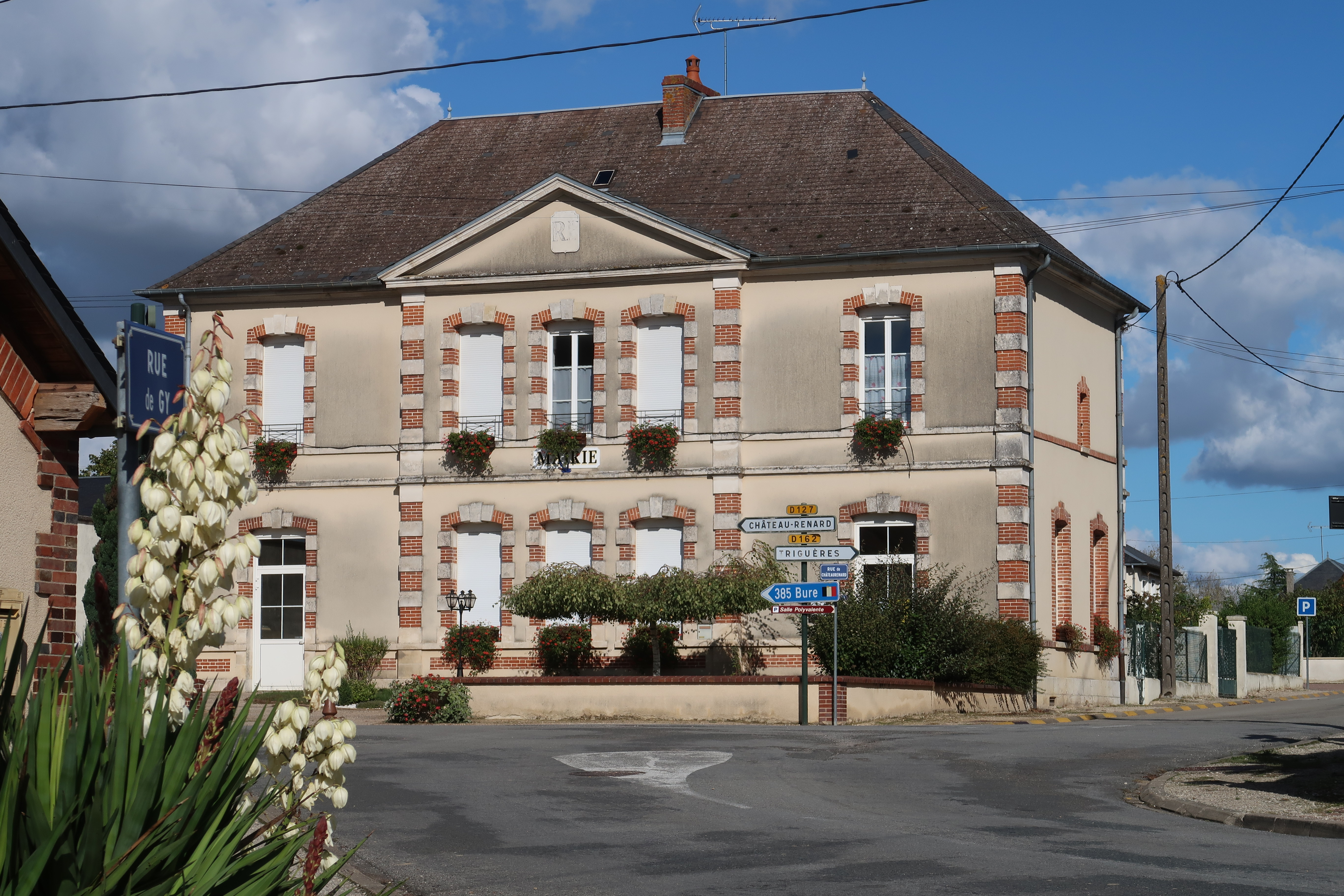
- Town hall

- Coat of arms
- Location of Melleroy
- Location within France Location within Centre-Val de Loire
- Coordinates: 47°53′44″N 2°57′11″E
- Country: France
- Region: Centre-Val de Loire
- Department: Loiret
- Arrondissement: Montargis
- Canton: Courtenay

Government
  - Mayor (2020–2026): Jacky Suard
- Area^{1}: 24.23 km^{2} (9.36 sq mi)
- Highest elevation: 191 m (627 ft)
- Lowest elevation: 133 m (436 ft)
- Population (2023): 516
  - Density: 21.3/km^{2} (55.2/sq mi)
- Demonym: Melleroysiens
- Time zone: UTC+01:00 (CET)
  - Summer (DST): UTC+02:00 (CEST)
- INSEE/Postal code: 45199 /45220
- ^{1} French Land Register data, which excludes lakes, ponds, glaciers > 1 km^{2} (0.386 sq mi or 247 acres) and river estuaries.

Melleroy (French pronunciation: [mɛlʁwa]) is a commune in the Loiret department in north-central France.

== See also ==
- Communes of the Loiret department
