= Saint-Firmin-des-Bois =

Commune in north-central France

- Commune
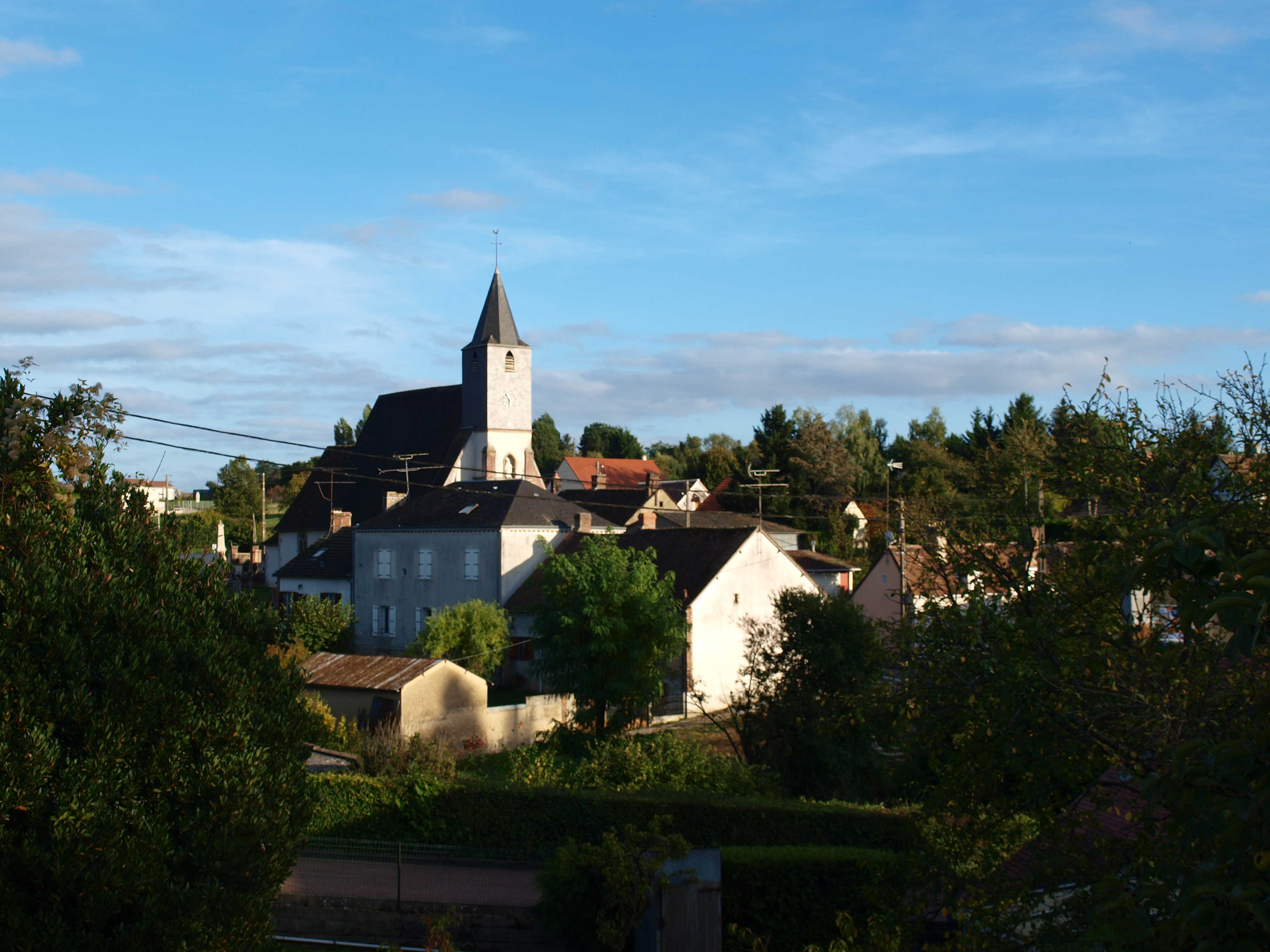
- The centre of Saint-Firmin-des-Bois

- Coat of arms
- Location of Saint-Firmin-des-Bois
- Location within France Location within Centre-Val de Loire
- Coordinates: 47°57′57″N 2°54′42″E
- Country: France
- Region: Centre-Val de Loire
- Department: Loiret
- Arrondissement: Montargis
- Canton: Courtenay

Government
  - Mayor (2020–2026): Francine De Wilde
- Area^{1}: 19.05 km^{2} (7.36 sq mi)
- Elevation: 180 m (590 ft)
- Highest elevation: 179 m (587 ft)
- Lowest elevation: 118 m (387 ft)
- Population (2023): 497
  - Density: 26.1/km^{2} (67.6/sq mi)
- Time zone: UTC+01:00 (CET)
  - Summer (DST): UTC+02:00 (CEST)
- INSEE/Postal code: 45275 /45220
- ^{1} French Land Register data, which excludes lakes, ponds, glaciers > 1 km^{2} (0.386 sq mi or 247 acres) and river estuaries.

Saint-Firmin-des-Bois (French pronunciation: [sɛ̃ fiʁmɛ̃ de bwa]) is a commune in the Loiret department in north-central France.

== See also ==
- Communes of the Loiret department
