= Ervauville =

- Commune
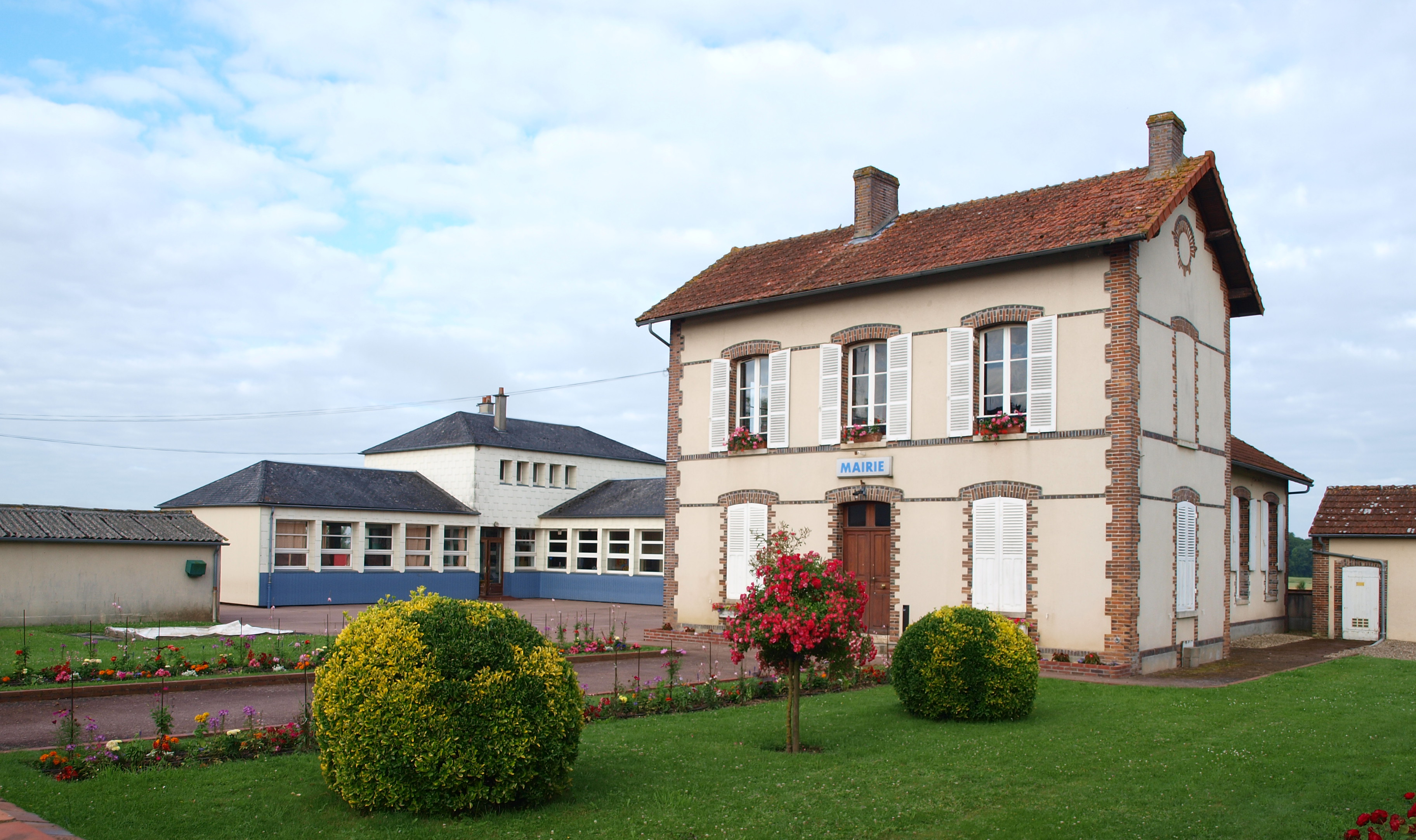
- The town hall and school in Ervauville

- Coat of arms
- Location of Ervauville
- Location within France Location within Centre-Val de Loire
- Coordinates: 48°05′26″N 2°58′57″E
- Country: France
- Region: Centre-Val de Loire
- Department: Loiret
- Arrondissement: Montargis
- Canton: Courtenay

Government
  - Mayor (2020–2026): Claudia Guespin
- Area^{1}: 12.54 km^{2} (4.84 sq mi)
- Highest elevation: 164 m (538 ft)
- Lowest elevation: 134 m (440 ft)
- Population (2023): 561
  - Density: 44.7/km^{2} (116/sq mi)
- Demonym: Ervauvillois
- Time zone: UTC+01:00 (CET)
  - Summer (DST): UTC+02:00 (CEST)
- INSEE/Postal code: 45136 /45320
- ^{1} French Land Register data, which excludes lakes, ponds, glaciers > 1 km^{2} (0.386 sq mi or 247 acres) and river estuaries.

Ervauville (French pronunciation: [ɛʁvovil]) is a commune in the Loiret department in north-central France.

== See also ==
- Communes of the Loiret department
