= Griselles, Loiret =

Griselles
- Commune
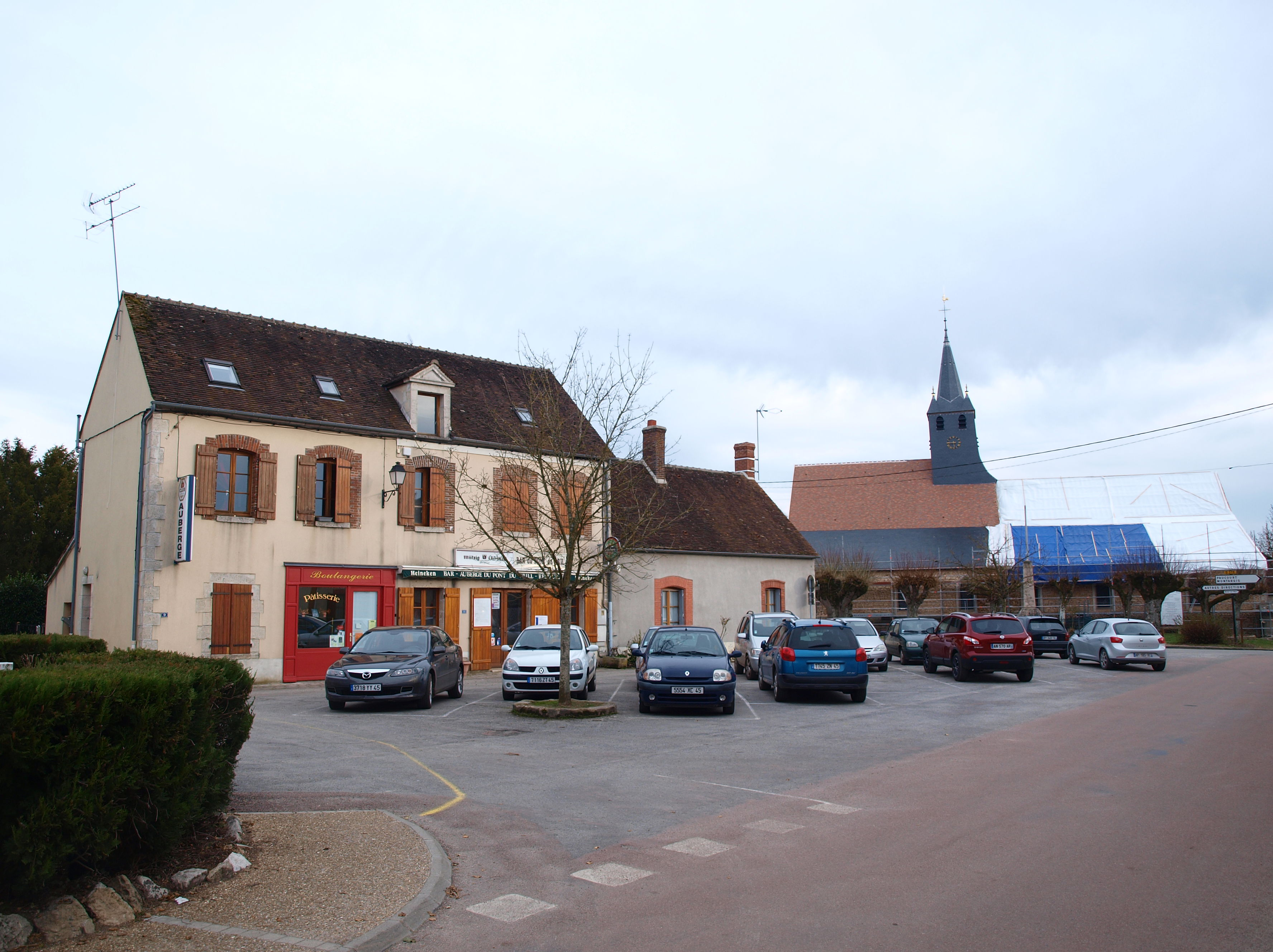
- The village square in Griselles
- Location of Griselles
- Location within France Location within Centre-Val de Loire
- Coordinates: 48°04′46″N 2°49′46″E
- Country: France
- Region: Centre-Val de Loire
- Department: Loiret
- Arrondissement: Montargis
- Canton: Courtenay
- Intercommunality: Quatre Vallées

Government
  - Mayor (2020–2026): Claude Madec-Cleï
- Area^{1}: 30.32 km^{2} (11.71 sq mi)
- Highest elevation: 107 m (351 ft)
- Lowest elevation: 87 m (285 ft)
- Population (2023): 826
  - Density: 27.2/km^{2} (70.6/sq mi)
- Demonym: Grisellois
- Time zone: UTC+01:00 (CET)
  - Summer (DST): UTC+02:00 (CEST)
- INSEE/Postal code: 45161 /45210
- ^{1} French Land Register data, which excludes lakes, ponds, glaciers > 1 km^{2} (0.386 sq mi or 247 acres) and river estuaries.

Griselles (French pronunciation: [ɡʁizɛl]) is a commune in the Loiret department in north-central France.

== See also ==
- Communes of the Loiret department
