= Triguères =

- Commune
- Coat of arms
- Location of Triguères
- Location within France Location within Centre-Val de Loire
- Coordinates: 47°56′21″N 2°58′54″E
- Country: France
- Region: Centre-Val de Loire
- Department: Loiret
- Arrondissement: Montargis
- Canton: Courtenay

Government
  - Mayor (2020–2026): Patrick Moreau
- Area^{1}: 35.78 km^{2} (13.81 sq mi)
- Highest elevation: 192 m (630 ft)
- Lowest elevation: 112 m (367 ft)
- Population (2023): 1,259
  - Density: 35.19/km^{2} (91.13/sq mi)
- Time zone: UTC+01:00 (CET)
  - Summer (DST): UTC+02:00 (CEST)
- INSEE/Postal code: 45329 /45220
- ^{1} French Land Register data, which excludes lakes, ponds, glaciers > 1 km^{2} (0.386 sq mi or 247 acres) and river estuaries.

Triguères (French pronunciation: [tʁiɡɛʁ]) is a commune in the Loiret department in north-central France.

== Geography ==
The commune is traversed by the Ouanne River.

== History ==
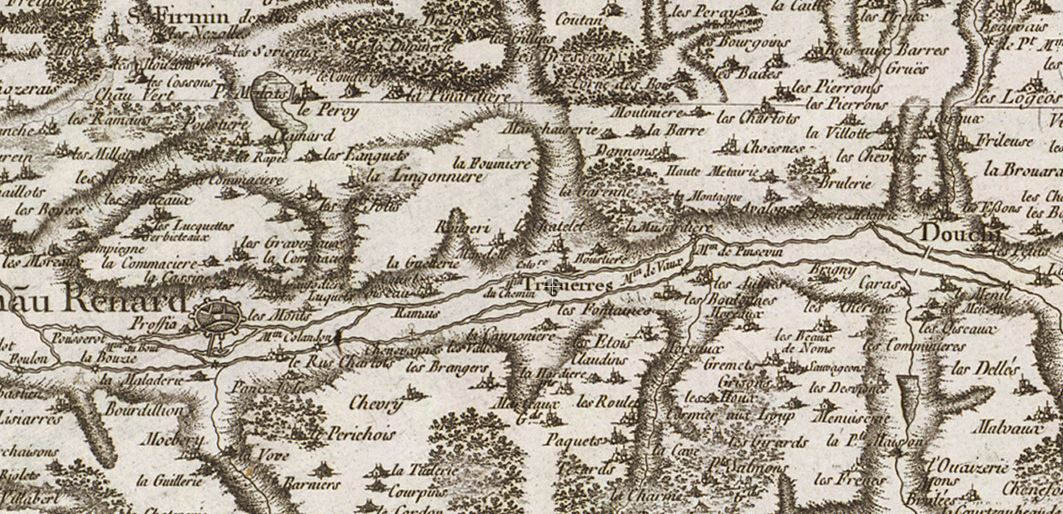
Triguères on Cassini map

Standing on the path from Orléans to Troyes - a major road from prehistoric times until the beginning of 19th century -, Triguères has provided many important prehistoric, Celtic and Roman remnants of its rich past.

=== Mousterian settlements ===
In 1922 a large Mousterian site was discovered at La Garenne. The artefacts found there, date from the end of acheulean tradition (from 500,000 to 300,000 y.a.) to the end of mousterian (30,000 y.a.).

=== Celtic times ===
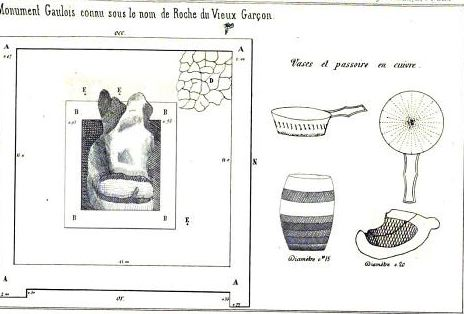
Trilithe du Vieux-Garçon (“The Old Boy”)

A Celtic oppidum over 22 acres wide stood on the hill north of the river, surveilling the « chemin Perré » ("stone path") where flint stones were used according to the Celtic method, and not stone slabs as per the Roman method.

=== Roman period ===
Triguères is a choice candidate for being the Vellaunodunum mentioned by Julius Caesar's in Commentarii de Bello Gallico. The remnants of a large Gallo-Roman town were found in the 1850-1860, notably an amphitheatre, (Note: Coordinates of the amphitheatre: 47°56′29.45″N 2°58′48.26″E. It is still clearly visible in aerial photographs. Even though a house was built there, the relief of its large semi circle figure unmistakably shows on local maps with altitude lines.) a cemetery in 1857, a source sanctuary at the moulin du Chemin in 1858, (Note: Coordinates of the moulin du Chemin: 47°56′18.88″N 2°58′48.98″E.) Gallo-Roman villas at les Vallées and les Monts, (Note: Coordinates of lieu-dit Les Vallées: 47°55′55.73″N 2°58′21.75″E) (Note: Coordinates of lieudit Les Monts: 47°56′7.13″N 2°57′2.28″E) a Gallo-Roman temple, an aqueduct and two public Roman baths.

Greater Triguères entirely disappeared in 451 when Attila passed through the valley, coming from Orléans which he failed to take (his first major drawback in his campaign) and on his way to a full defeat at the battle of the Catalaunian Plains. Triguères waited for six centuries to start its rebirth, and it never recovered its former splendour.

=== Middle Ages ===
Saint Alpais of Cudot and his legend precede Triguères' rebuilding, along with the Christian expansion. Saint-Martin church dates back from the end of the 11th century.

The Chatelet house was built in 1550.

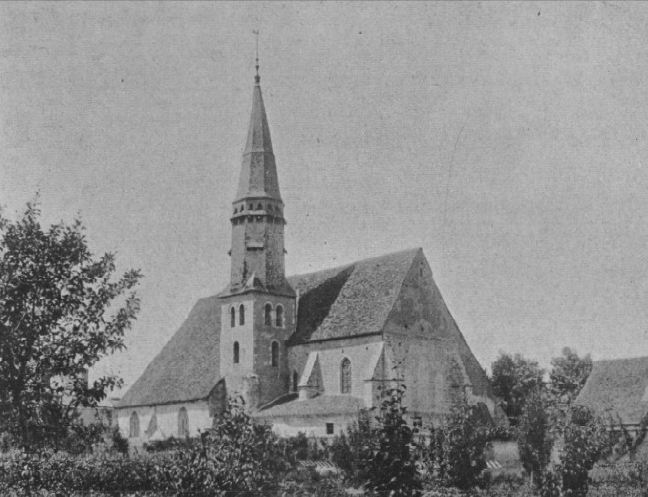
Saint-Martin church seen from the south-east

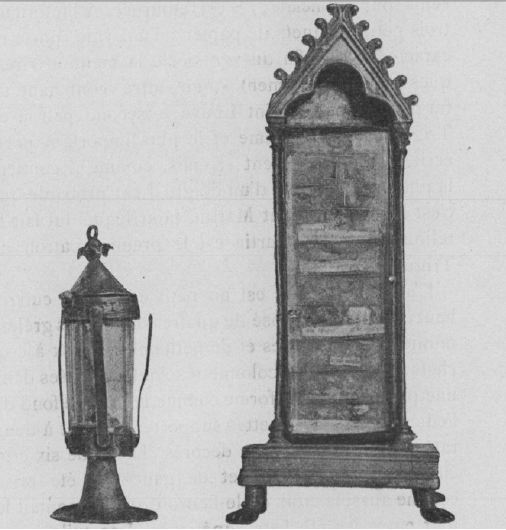
Reliquaries of Saint-Martin church in Triguères

== See also ==
- Communes of the Loiret department
