= La Chapelle-Saint-Sépulcre =

- Commune
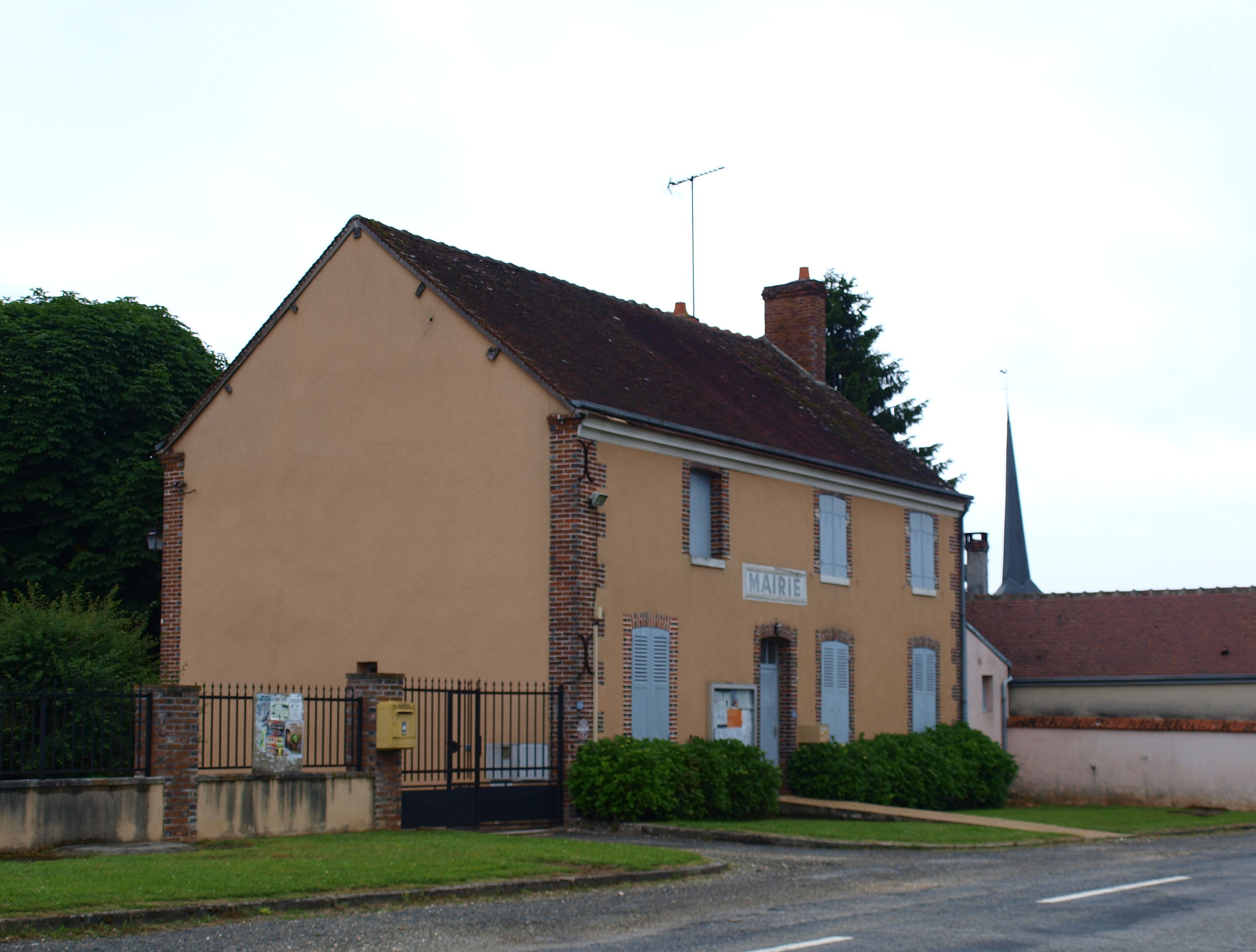
- The town hall in La Chapelle-Saint-Sépulcre

- Coat of arms
- Location of La Chapelle-Saint-Sépulcre
- Location within France Location within Centre-Val de Loire
- Coordinates: 48°01′07″N 2°50′43″E
- Country: France
- Region: Centre-Val de Loire
- Department: Loiret
- Arrondissement: Montargis
- Canton: Courtenay

Government
  - Mayor (2020–2026): André Duchesne
- Area^{1}: 6.21 km^{2} (2.40 sq mi)
- Highest elevation: 137 m (449 ft)
- Lowest elevation: 102 m (335 ft)
- Population (2023): 219
  - Density: 35.3/km^{2} (91.3/sq mi)
- Demonym: Capellois
- Time zone: UTC+01:00 (CET)
  - Summer (DST): UTC+02:00 (CEST)
- INSEE/Postal code: 45076 /45210
- ^{1} French Land Register data, which excludes lakes, ponds, glaciers > 1 km^{2} (0.386 sq mi or 247 acres) and river estuaries.

La Chapelle-Saint-Sépulcre is a commune in the Loiret department in north-central France. It is part of the canton of Courtenay and of the arrondissement of Montargis.

== See also ==
- Communes of the Loiret department
