= Chevannes, Loiret =

Chevannes
- Commune
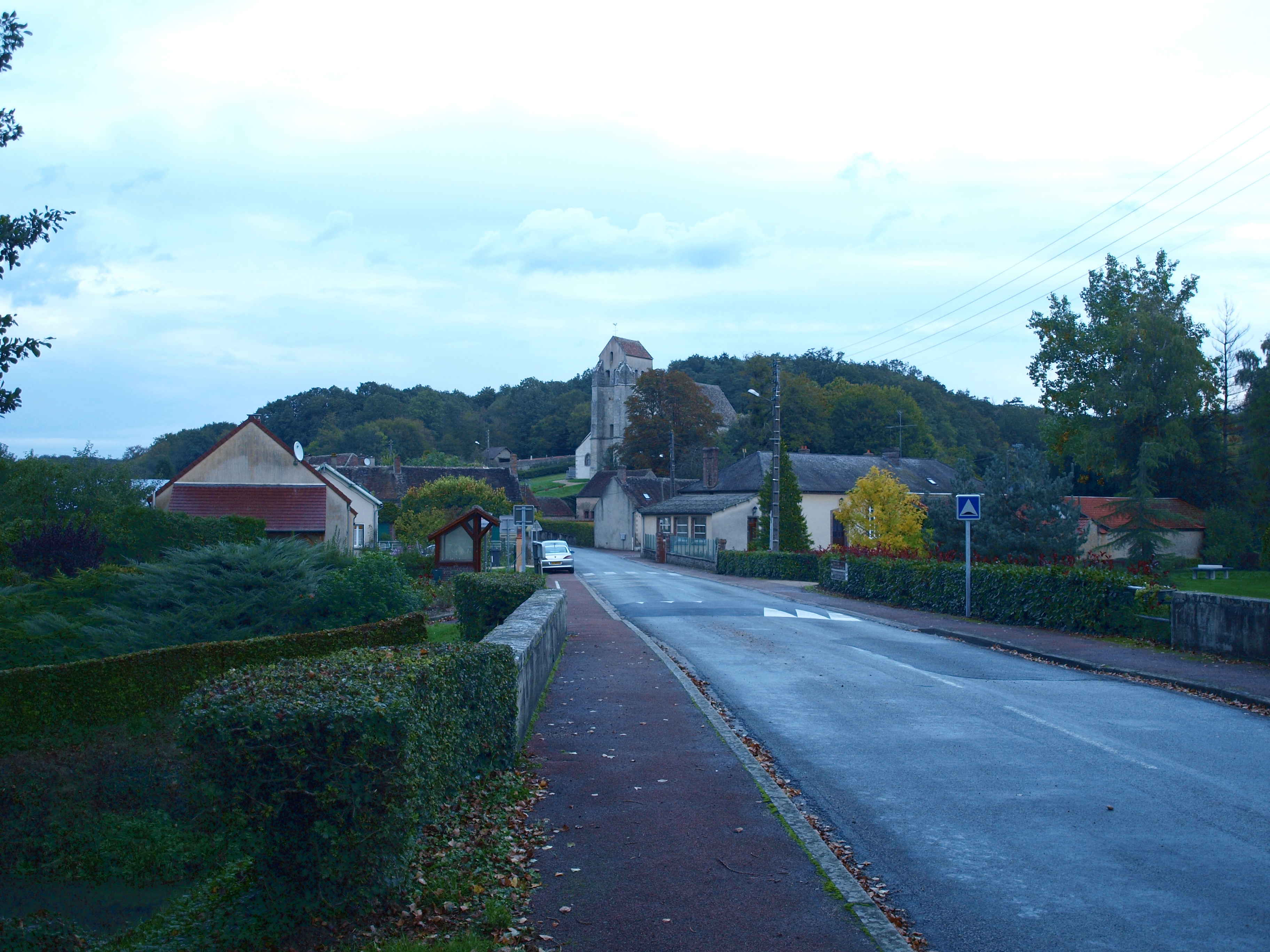
- Chevannes seen from the bridge
- Location of Chevannes
- Location within France Location within Centre-Val de Loire
- Coordinates: 48°08′07″N 2°51′37″E
- Country: France
- Region: Centre-Val de Loire
- Department: Loiret
- Arrondissement: Montargis
- Canton: Courtenay
- Intercommunality: Quatre Vallées

Government
  - Mayor (2020–2026): Jean-Claude Dellion
- Area^{1}: 11.99 km^{2} (4.63 sq mi)
- Highest elevation: 126 m (413 ft)
- Lowest elevation: 91 m (299 ft)
- Population (2023): 306
  - Density: 25.5/km^{2} (66.1/sq mi)
- Demonym: Chevannois
- Time zone: UTC+01:00 (CET)
  - Summer (DST): UTC+02:00 (CEST)
- INSEE/Postal code: 45091 /45210
- ^{1} French Land Register data, which excludes lakes, ponds, glaciers > 1 km^{2} (0.386 sq mi or 247 acres) and river estuaries.

Chevannes (French pronunciation: [ʃəvan]) is a commune in the Loiret department in north-central France.

== See also ==
- Communes of the Loiret department
