= Foucherolles =

- Commune
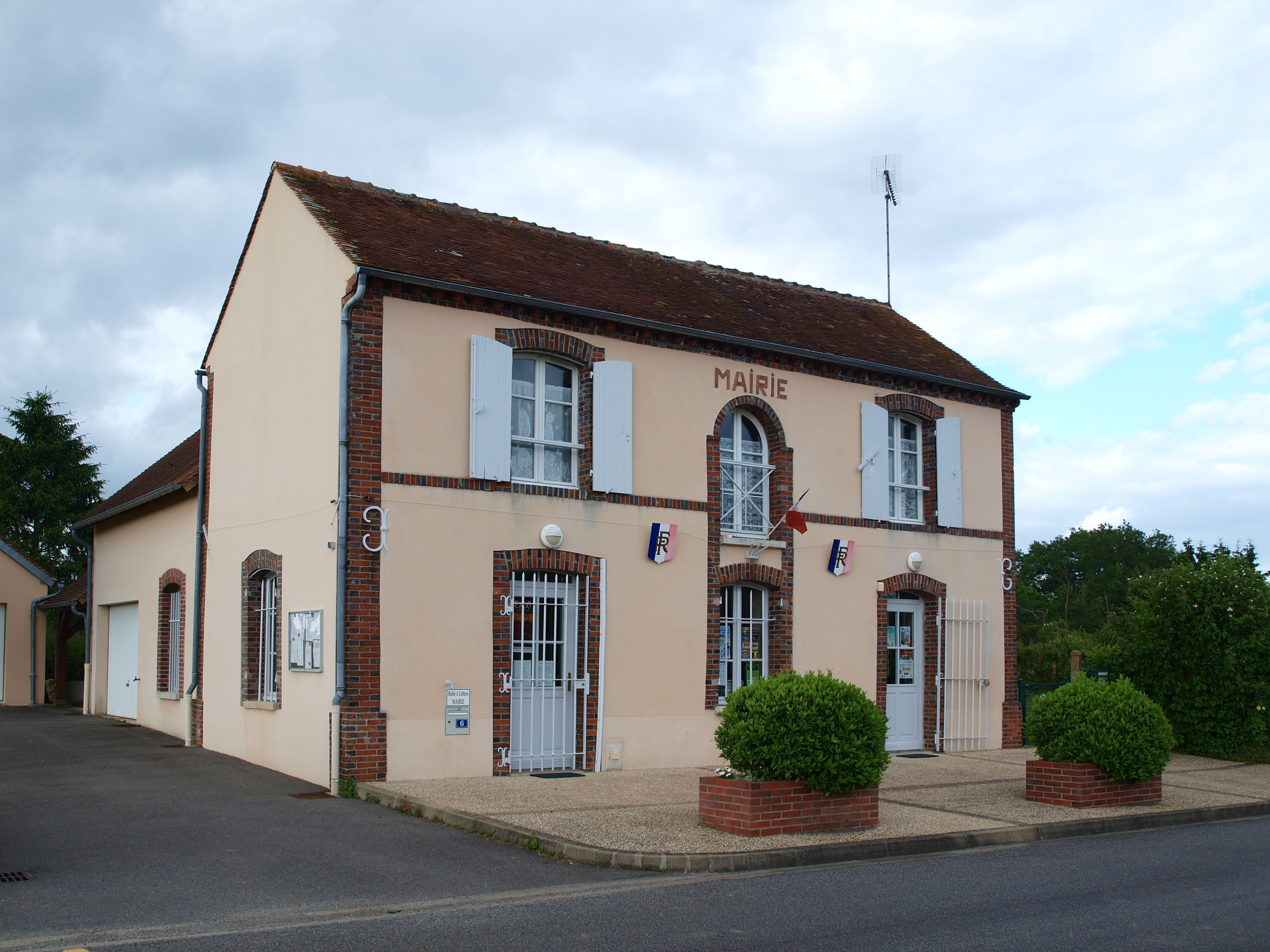
- The town hall in Foucherolles

- Coat of arms
- Location of Foucherolles
- Location within France Location within Centre-Val de Loire
- Coordinates: 48°05′39″N 3°00′47″E
- Country: France
- Region: Centre-Val de Loire
- Department: Loiret
- Arrondissement: Montargis
- Canton: Courtenay

Government
  - Mayor (2020–2026): Patrick Orth
- Area^{1}: 9.80 km^{2} (3.78 sq mi)
- Highest elevation: 164 m (538 ft)
- Lowest elevation: 142 m (466 ft)
- Population (2023): 319
  - Density: 32.6/km^{2} (84.3/sq mi)
- Demonym: Foucherollais
- Time zone: UTC+01:00 (CET)
  - Summer (DST): UTC+02:00 (CEST)
- INSEE/Postal code: 45149 /45320
- ^{1} French Land Register data, which excludes lakes, ponds, glaciers > 1 km^{2} (0.386 sq mi or 247 acres) and river estuaries.

Foucherolles (French pronunciation: [fuʃʁɔl]) is a commune in the Loiret department in north-central France.

== See also ==
- Communes of the Loiret department
