= Nargis, Loiret =

Nargis
- Commune
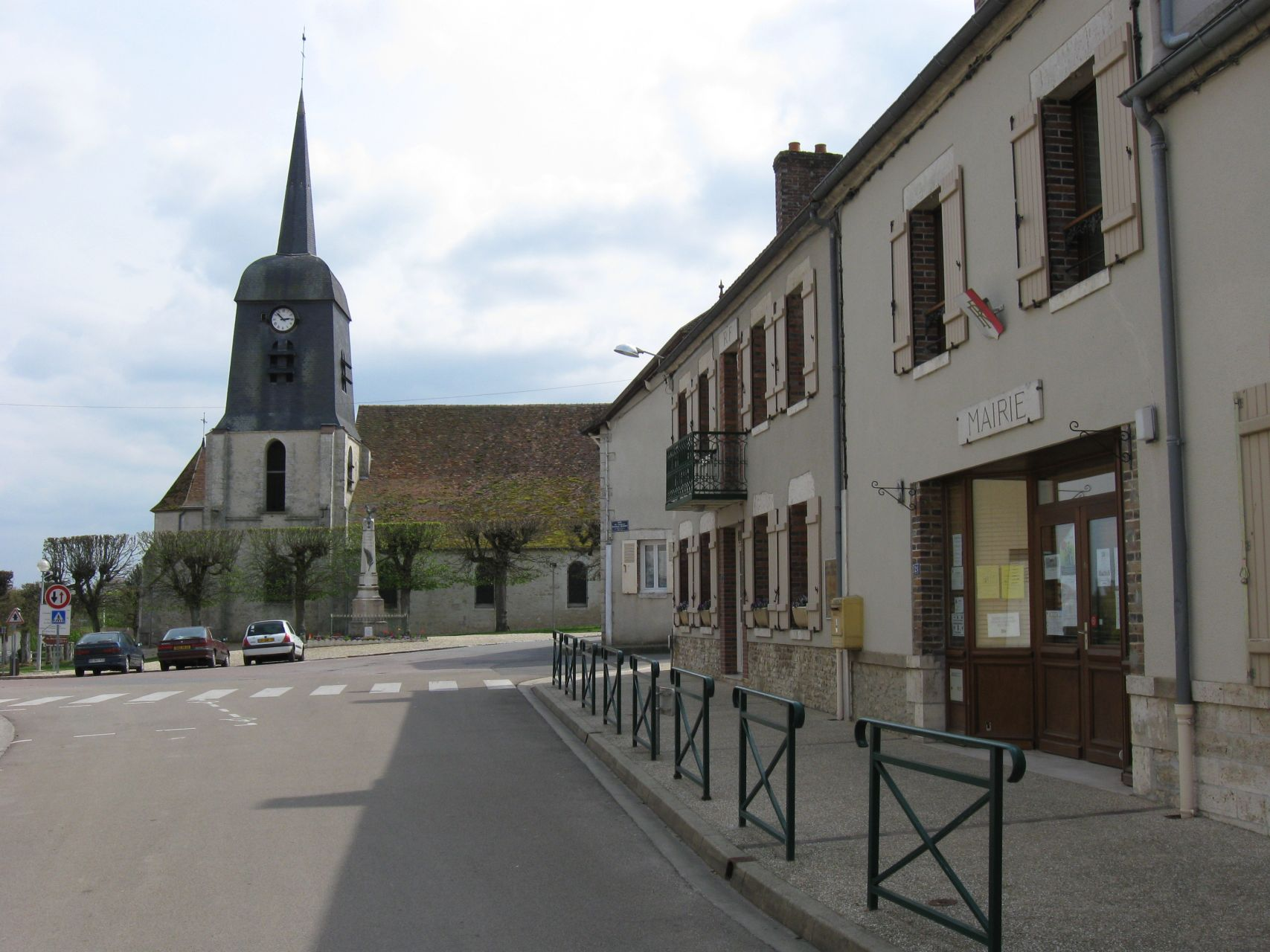
- The town hall and church in Nargis

- Coat of arms
- Location of Nargis
- Location within France Location within Centre-Val de Loire
- Coordinates: 48°06′42″N 2°45′27″E
- Country: France
- Region: Centre-Val de Loire
- Department: Loiret
- Arrondissement: Montargis
- Canton: Courtenay
- Intercommunality: Quatre Vallées

Government
  - Mayor (2020–2026): Pascal De Temmerman
- Area^{1}: 22.27 km^{2} (8.60 sq mi)
- Elevation: 102 m (335 ft)
- Highest elevation: 109 m (358 ft)
- Lowest elevation: 67 m (220 ft)
- Population (2023): 1,422
  - Density: 63.85/km^{2} (165.4/sq mi)
- Time zone: UTC+01:00 (CET)
  - Summer (DST): UTC+02:00 (CEST)
- INSEE/Postal code: 45222 /45210
- ^{1} French Land Register data, which excludes lakes, ponds, glaciers > 1 km^{2} (0.386 sq mi or 247 acres) and river estuaries.

Nargis (French pronunciation: [naʁʒi]) is a commune in the Loiret department in north-central France. It is situated along the Loing river, a tributary of the Seine river.

== See also ==
- Communes of the Loiret department
