= Chantecoq =

- Commune
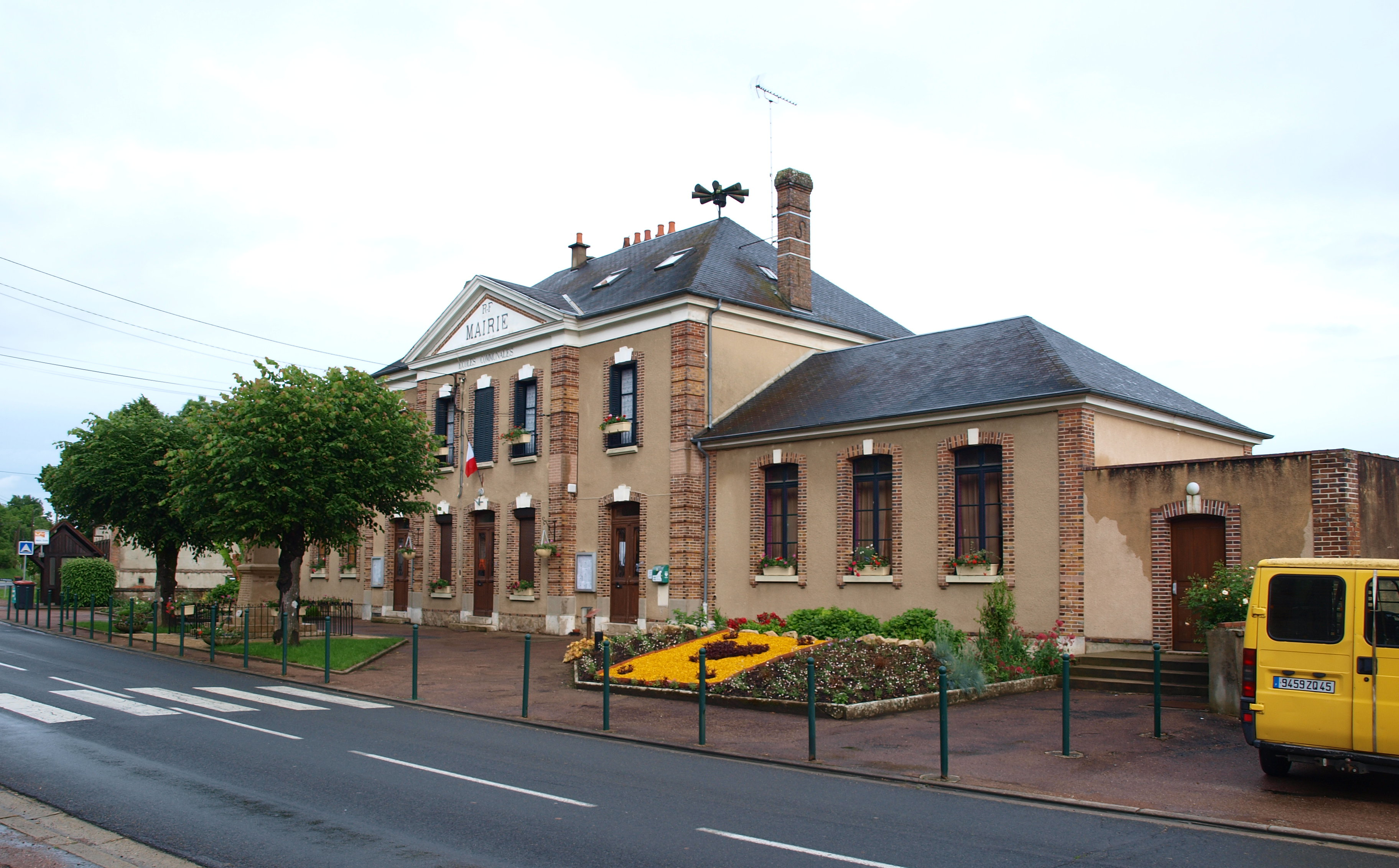
- The town hall in Chantecoq

- Coat of arms
- Location of Chantecoq
- Location within France Location within Centre-Val de Loire
- Coordinates: 48°03′11″N 2°57′27″E
- Country: France
- Region: Centre-Val de Loire
- Department: Loiret
- Arrondissement: Montargis
- Canton: Courtenay

Government
  - Mayor (2020–2026): Jean-Pierre Lapène
- Area^{1}: 15.93 km^{2} (6.15 sq mi)
- Highest elevation: 167 m (548 ft)
- Lowest elevation: 115 m (377 ft)
- Population (2023): 518
  - Density: 32.5/km^{2} (84.2/sq mi)
- Demonym: Chantecoquois
- Time zone: UTC+01:00 (CET)
  - Summer (DST): UTC+02:00 (CEST)
- INSEE/Postal code: 45073 /45320
- Website: www.mairie-chantecoq.fr
- ^{1} French Land Register data, which excludes lakes, ponds, glaciers > 1 km^{2} (0.386 sq mi or 247 acres) and river estuaries.

Chantecoq (French pronunciation: [ʃɑ̃tkɔk] or [ʃɑ̃tko]) is a commune in the Loiret department in north-central France.

== See also ==
- Communes of the Loiret department
