= Mérinville =

- Commune
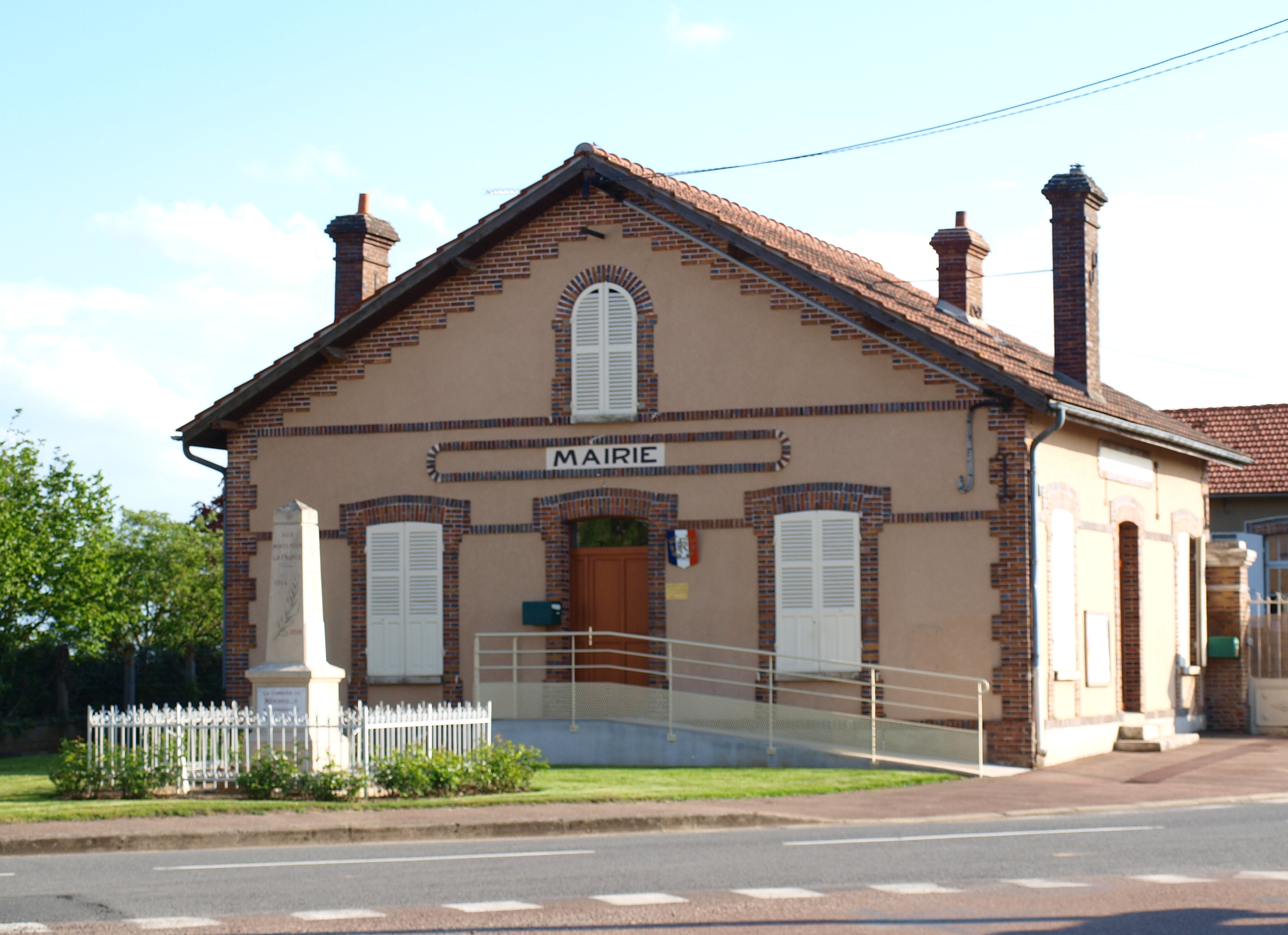
- The town hall and war memorial in Mérinville

- Coat of arms
- Location of Mérinville
- Location within France Location within Centre-Val de Loire
- Coordinates: 48°05′00″N 2°56′33″E
- Country: France
- Region: Centre-Val de Loire
- Department: Loiret
- Arrondissement: Montargis
- Canton: Courtenay

Government
  - Mayor (2024–2026): Stéphane Caperonis
- Area^{1}: 11.84 km^{2} (4.57 sq mi)
- Highest elevation: 149 m (489 ft)
- Lowest elevation: 127 m (417 ft)
- Population (2023): 171
  - Density: 14.4/km^{2} (37.4/sq mi)
- Demonym: Melleroysiens
- Time zone: UTC+01:00 (CET)
  - Summer (DST): UTC+02:00 (CEST)
- INSEE/Postal code: 45201 /45210
- ^{1} French Land Register data, which excludes lakes, ponds, glaciers > 1 km^{2} (0.386 sq mi or 247 acres) and river estuaries.

Mérinville (French pronunciation: [meʁɛ̃vil]) is a commune in the Loiret department in north-central France.

== See also ==
- Communes of the Loiret department
