= Préfontaines =

- Commune
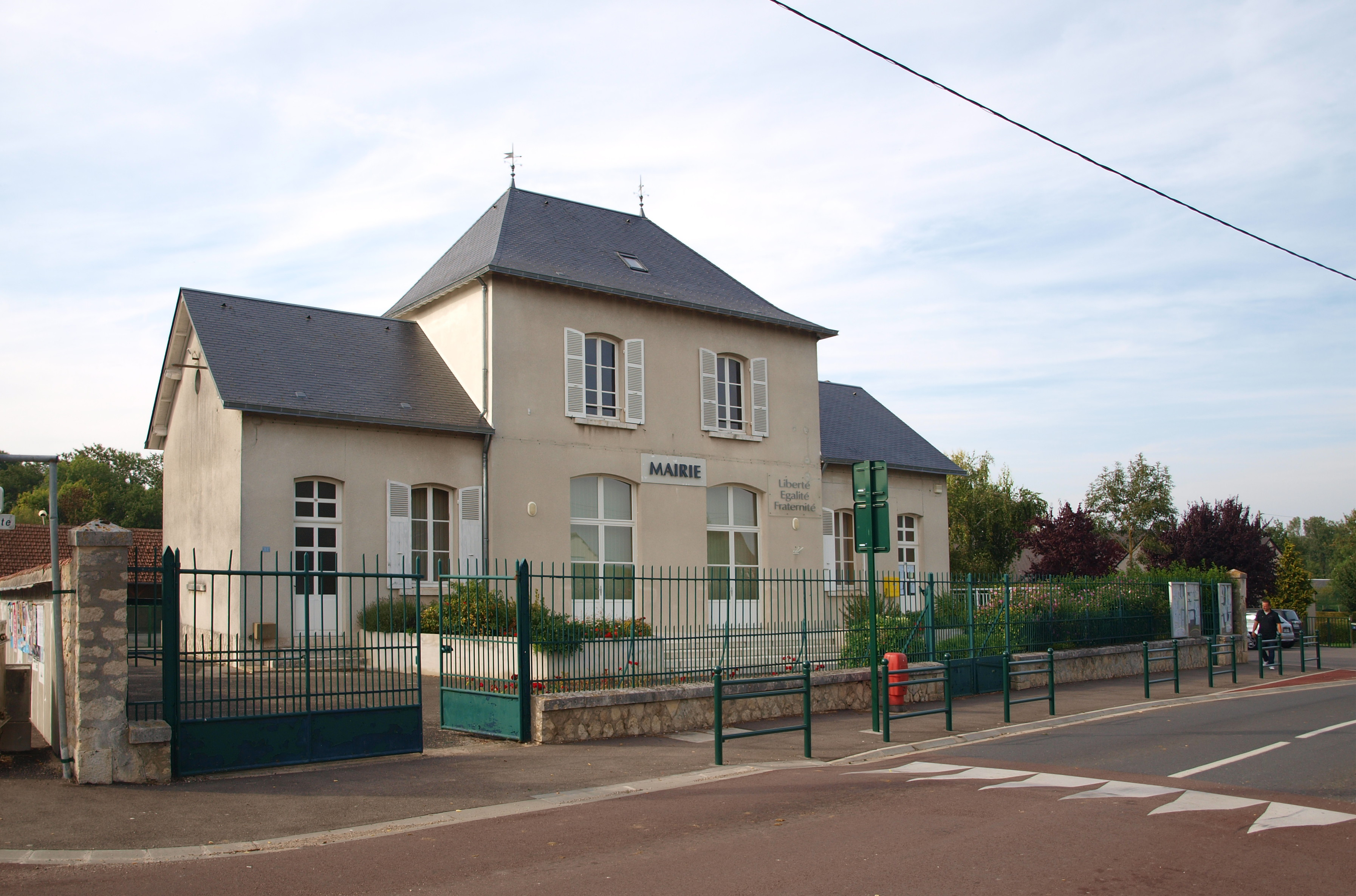
- The town hall in Préfontaines

- Coat of arms
- Location of Préfontaines
- Location within France Location within Centre-Val de Loire
- Coordinates: 48°06′31″N 2°41′27″E
- Country: France
- Region: Centre-Val de Loire
- Department: Loiret
- Arrondissement: Montargis
- Canton: Courtenay
- Intercommunality: Quatre Vallées

Government
  - Mayor (2020–2026): Michel Harang
- Area^{1}: 11.75 km^{2} (4.54 sq mi)
- Highest elevation: 102 m (335 ft)
- Lowest elevation: 77 m (253 ft)
- Population (2023): 428
  - Density: 36.4/km^{2} (94.3/sq mi)
- Demonym: Pratifontain(e)s
- Time zone: UTC+01:00 (CET)
  - Summer (DST): UTC+02:00 (CEST)
- INSEE/Postal code: 45255 /
- ^{1} French Land Register data, which excludes lakes, ponds, glaciers > 1 km^{2} (0.386 sq mi or 247 acres) and river estuaries.

Préfontaines (French pronunciation: [pʁefɔ̃tɛn]) is a commune in the Loiret department in north-central France.

== See also ==
- Communes of the Loiret department
