= Gy-les-Nonains =

- Commune
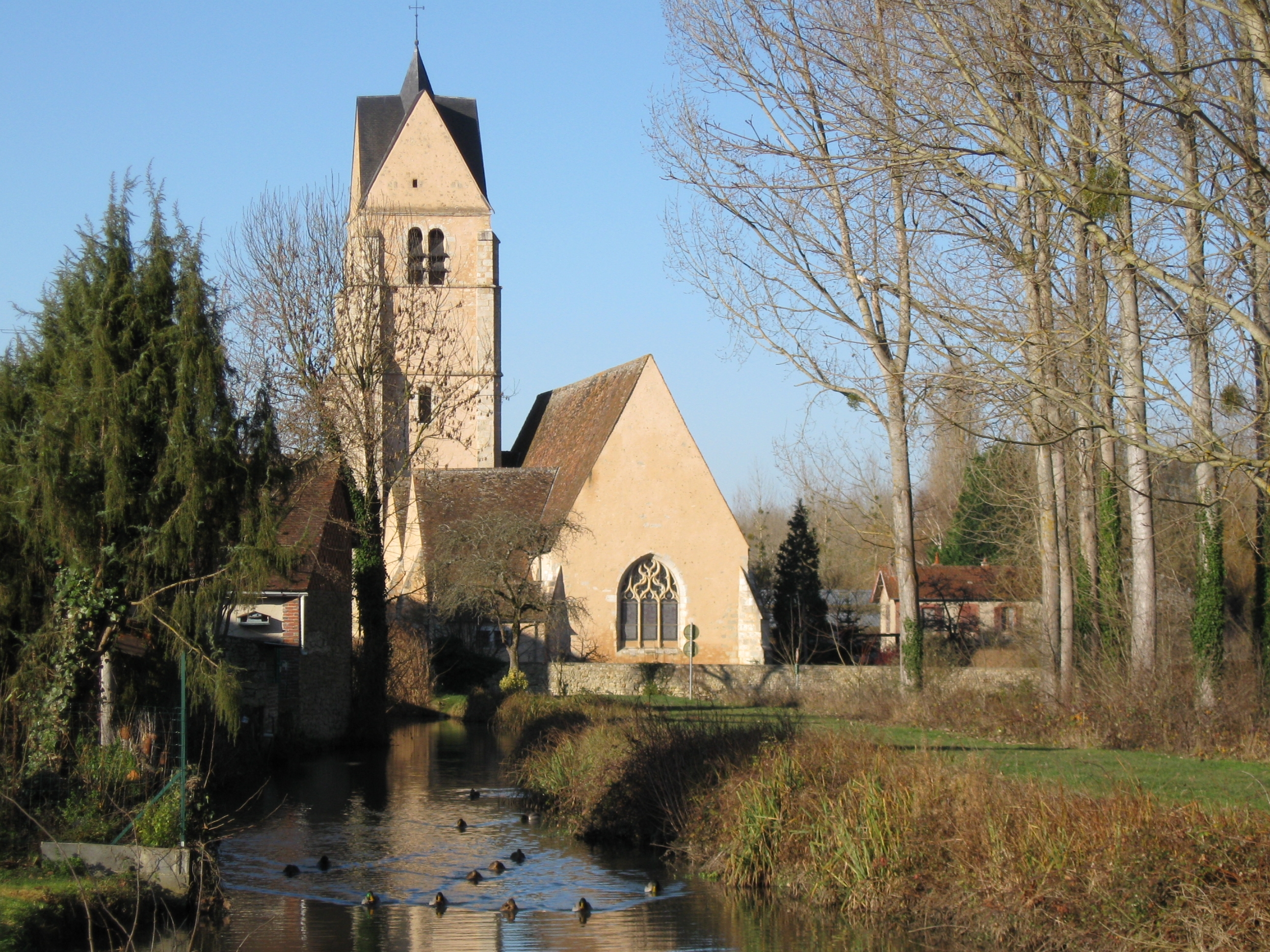
- The church in Gy-les-Nonains, with a tributary of the Ouanne

- Coat of arms
- Location of Gy-les-Nonains
- Location within France Location within Centre-Val de Loire
- Coordinates: 47°56′50″N 2°51′07″E
- Country: France
- Region: Centre-Val de Loire
- Department: Loiret
- Arrondissement: Montargis
- Canton: Courtenay
- Intercommunality: Cléry, Betz et Ouanne

Government
  - Mayor (2020–2026): Laurent Bricard
- Area^{1}: 20.13 km^{2} (7.77 sq mi)
- Highest elevation: 147 m (482 ft)
- Lowest elevation: 98 m (322 ft)
- Population (2023): 604
  - Density: 30.0/km^{2} (77.7/sq mi)
- Demonym: Gyssois
- Time zone: UTC+01:00 (CET)
  - Summer (DST): UTC+02:00 (CEST)
- INSEE/Postal code: 45165 /45220
- ^{1} French Land Register data, which excludes lakes, ponds, glaciers > 1 km^{2} (0.386 sq mi or 247 acres) and river estuaries.

Gy-les-Nonains (French pronunciation: [ʒi le nɔnɛ̃]) is a commune in the Loiret department in north-central France.

== Geography ==
The commune is traversed by the river Ouanne.

== See also ==
- Communes of the Loiret department
