= Saint-Germain-des-Prés, Loiret =

Saint-Germain-des-Prés
- Commune
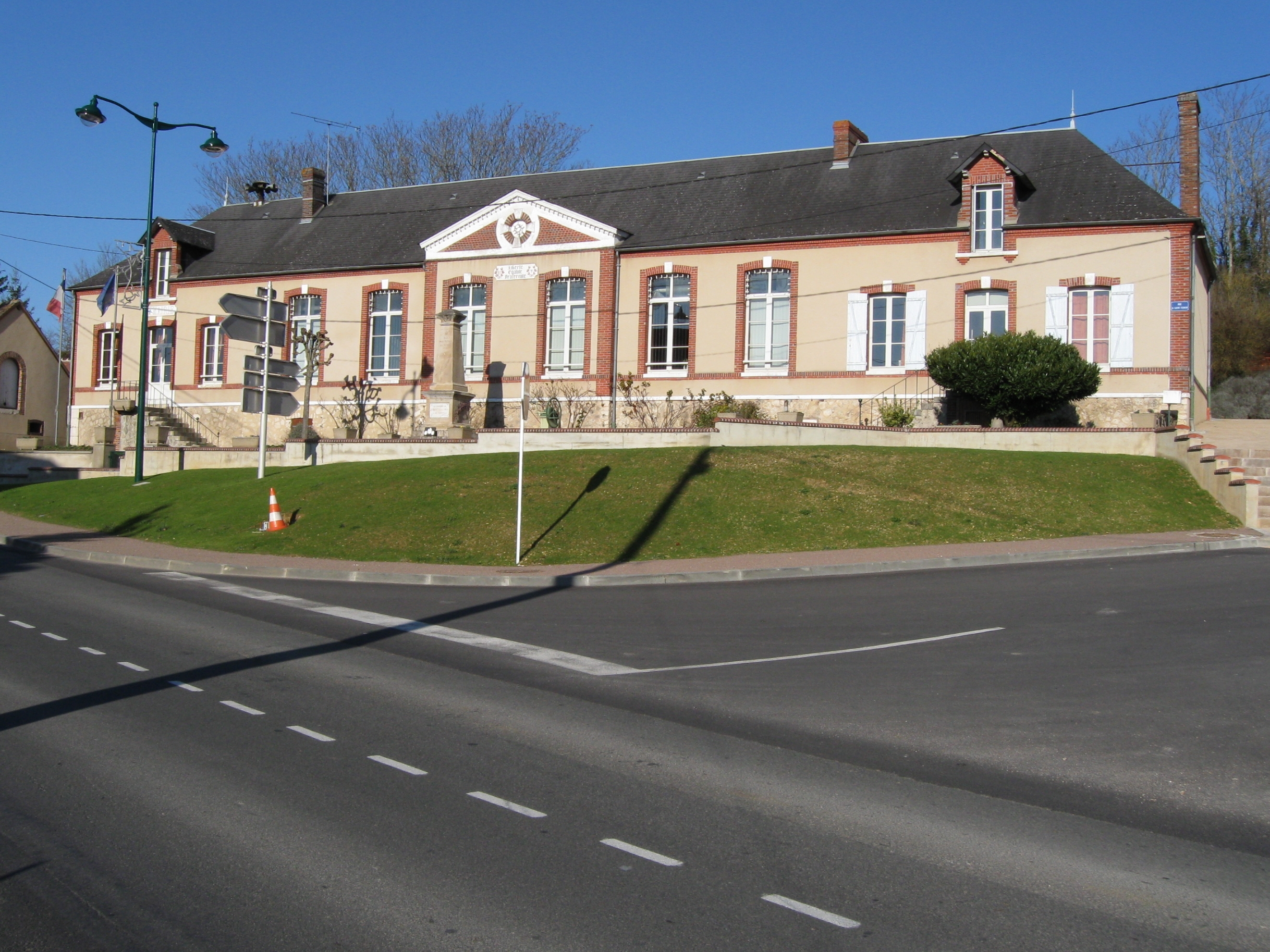
- Town hall

- Coat of arms
- Location of Saint-Germain-des-Prés
- Location within France Location within Centre-Val de Loire
- Coordinates: 47°57′11″N 2°50′52″E
- Country: France
- Region: Centre-Val de Loire
- Department: Loiret
- Arrondissement: Montargis
- Canton: Courtenay

Government
  - Mayor (2020–2026): Christophe Bethoul
- Area^{1}: 26.18 km^{2} (10.11 sq mi)
- Highest elevation: 148 m (486 ft)
- Lowest elevation: 95 m (312 ft)
- Population (2023): 1,849
  - Density: 70.63/km^{2} (182.9/sq mi)
- Time zone: UTC+01:00 (CET)
  - Summer (DST): UTC+02:00 (CEST)
- INSEE/Postal code: 45279 /45220
- ^{1} French Land Register data, which excludes lakes, ponds, glaciers > 1 km^{2} (0.386 sq mi or 247 acres) and river estuaries.

Saint-Germain-des-Prés (French pronunciation: [sɛ̃ ʒɛʁmɛ̃ de pʁe]) is a commune in the Loiret department in north-central France.

== Geography ==
The commune is traversed by the river Ouanne.

== See also ==
- Communes of the Loiret department
