= La Selle-en-Hermoy =

- Commune
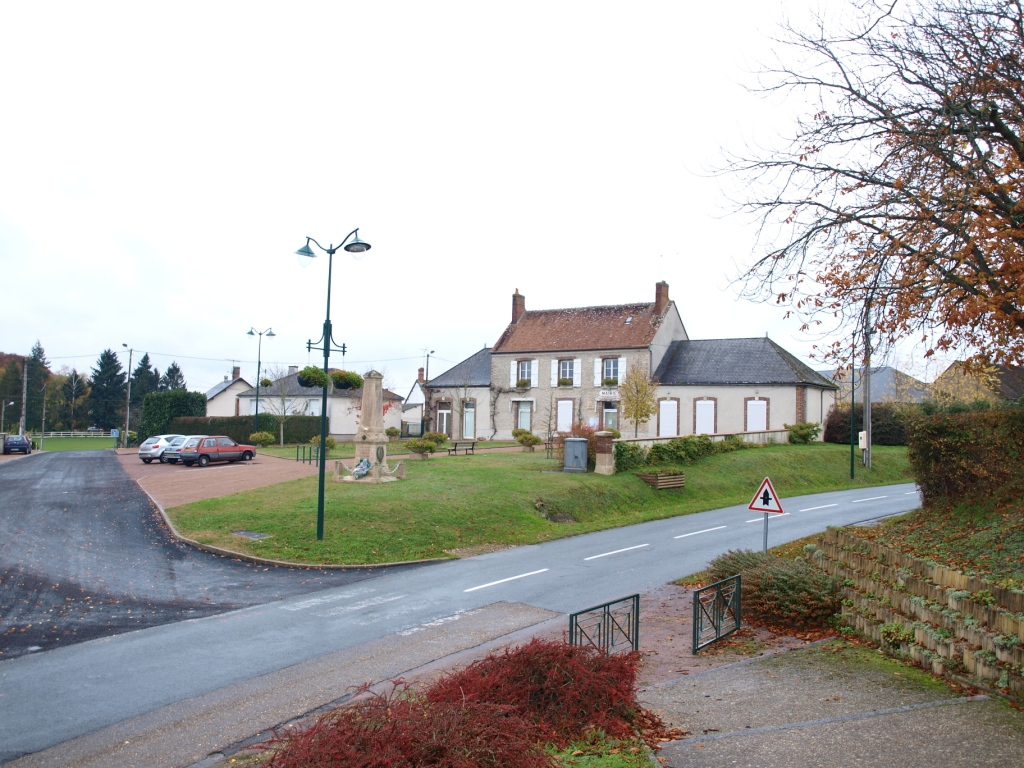
- The town hall square in La Selle-en-Hermoy

- Coat of arms
- Location of La Selle-en-Hermoy
- Location within France Location within Centre-Val de Loire
- Coordinates: 48°00′37″N 2°53′43″E
- Country: France
- Region: Centre-Val de Loire
- Department: Loiret
- Arrondissement: Montargis
- Canton: Courtenay
- Intercommunality: Cléry, Betz et Ouanne

Government
  - Mayor (2020–2026): Laurent Rabillon
- Area^{1}: 19.56 km^{2} (7.55 sq mi)
- Highest elevation: 156 m (512 ft)
- Lowest elevation: 112 m (367 ft)
- Population (2023): 784
  - Density: 40.1/km^{2} (104/sq mi)
- Time zone: UTC+01:00 (CET)
  - Summer (DST): UTC+02:00 (CEST)
- INSEE/Postal code: 45306 /45210
- ^{1} French Land Register data, which excludes lakes, ponds, glaciers > 1 km^{2} (0.386 sq mi or 247 acres) and river estuaries.

La Selle-en-Hermoy is a commune in the Loiret department in north-central France.

== See also ==
- Communes of the Loiret department
