= Corquilleroy =

- Commune
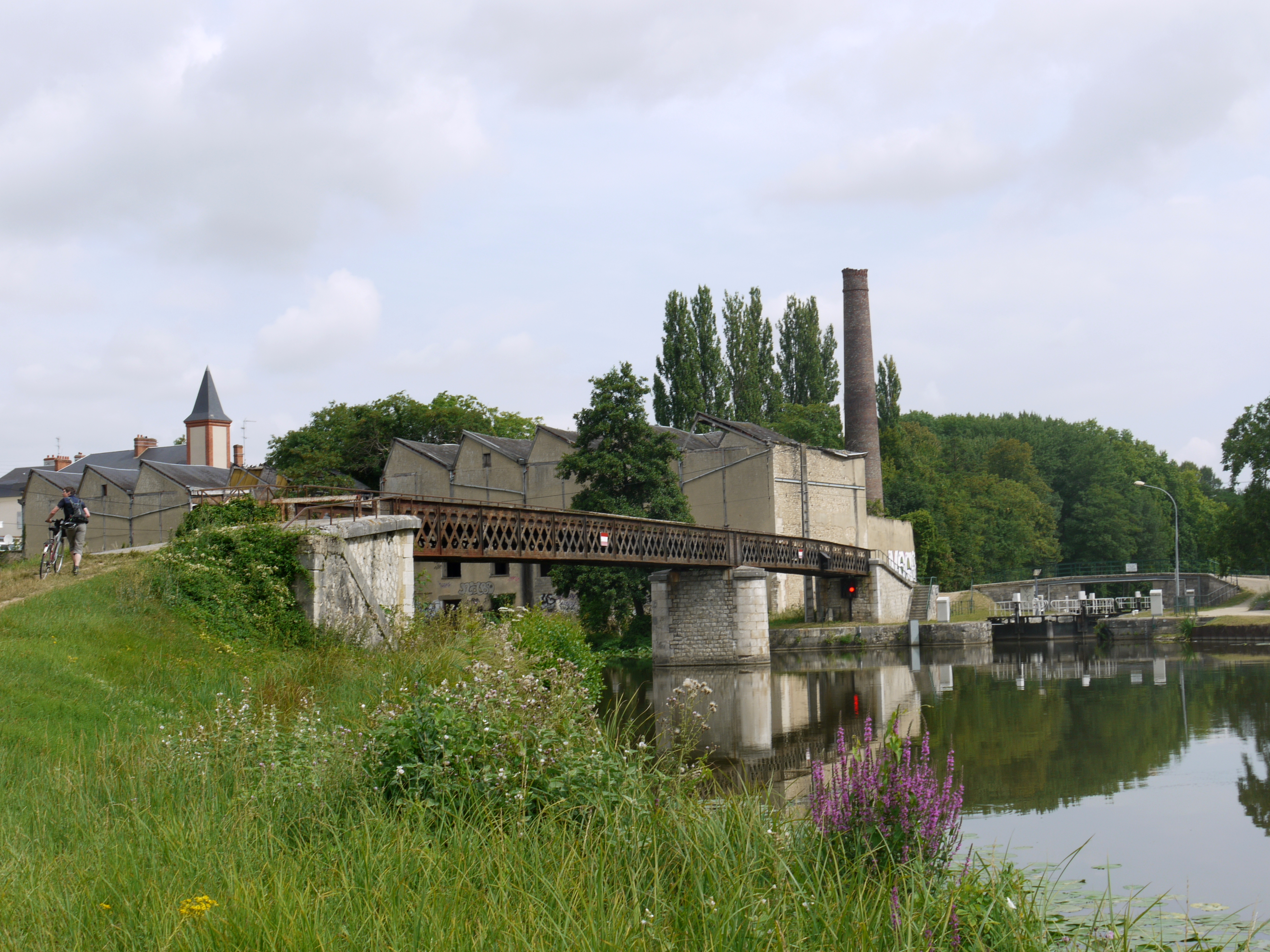
- The junction, in the hamlet of Buges, between the Loing Canal, Briare canal and the Orleans Canal
- Location of Corquilleroy
- Location within France Location within Centre-Val de Loire
- Coordinates: 48°02′44″N 2°42′02″E
- Country: France
- Region: Centre-Val de Loire
- Department: Loiret
- Arrondissement: Montargis
- Canton: Châlette-sur-Loing
- Intercommunality: CA Montargoise et Rives du Loing

Government
  - Mayor (2020–2026): René Béguin
- Area^{1}: 13.96 km^{2} (5.39 sq mi)
- Highest elevation: 102 m (335 ft)
- Lowest elevation: 80 m (260 ft)
- Population (2023): 2,891
  - Density: 207.1/km^{2} (536.4/sq mi)
- Demonym: Guilleroys et Guilleroises
- Time zone: UTC+01:00 (CET)
  - Summer (DST): UTC+02:00 (CEST)
- INSEE/Postal code: 45104 /45120
- ^{1} French Land Register data, which excludes lakes, ponds, glaciers > 1 km^{2} (0.386 sq mi or 247 acres) and river estuaries.

Corquilleroy (French pronunciation: [kɔʁkilˈʁwa]) is a commune in the department of Loiret, Centre-Val de Loire, France.

== Population ==
Historical population
Year	Pop.	±% p.a.
1968	1,650	—
1975	1,788	+1.15%
1982	1,842	+0.43%
1990	1,893	+0.34%
1999	2,108	+1.20%
2007	2,440	+1.85%
2012	2,715	+2.16%
2017	2,792	+0.56%
2023	2,891	+0.58%
Source: INSEE

== See also ==
- Communes of the Loiret department
