= Canton of Courtenay =

Coordinates: 48.04°N 3.06°E

The canton of Courtenay is an administrative division of the Loiret department, central France. Its borders were modified at the French canton reorganisation which came into effect in March 2015. Its seat is in Courtenay.

It consists of the following communes:

1. Bazoches-sur-le-Betz
2. Le Bignon-Mirabeau
3. Chantecoq
4. La Chapelle-Saint-Sépulcre
5. Château-Renard
6. Chevannes
7. Chevry-sous-le-Bignon
8. Chuelles
9. Corbeilles
10. Courtemaux
11. Courtempierre
12. Courtenay
13. Dordives
14. Douchy-Montcorbon
15. Ervauville
16. Ferrières-en-Gâtinais
17. Fontenay-sur-Loing
18. Foucherolles
19. Girolles
20. Gondreville
21. Griselles
22. Gy-les-Nonains
23. Louzouer
24. Melleroy
25. Mérinville
26. Mignères
27. Mignerette
28. Nargis
29. Pers-en-Gâtinais
30. Préfontaines
31. Rozoy-le-Vieil
32. Saint-Firmin-des-Bois
33. Saint-Germain-des-Prés
34. Saint-Hilaire-les-Andrésis
35. Sceaux-du-Gâtinais
36. La Selle-en-Hermoy
37. La Selle-sur-le-Bied
38. Thorailles
39. Treilles-en-Gâtinais
40. Triguères
41. Villevoques
