= Le Bignon-Mirabeau =

- Commune
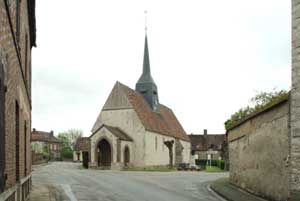
- The church in Le Bignon-Mirabeau
- Location of Le Bignon-Mirabeau
- Location within France Location within Centre-Val de Loire
- Coordinates: 48°08′56″N 2°55′25″E
- Country: France
- Region: Centre-Val de Loire
- Department: Loiret
- Arrondissement: Montargis
- Canton: Courtenay
- Intercommunality: Quatre Vallées

Government
  - Mayor (2020–2026): Jean-Luc D'Haeger
- Area^{1}: 12.83 km^{2} (4.95 sq mi)
- Highest elevation: 141 m (463 ft)
- Lowest elevation: 120 m (390 ft)
- Population (2023): 303
  - Density: 23.6/km^{2} (61.2/sq mi)
- Time zone: UTC+01:00 (CET)
  - Summer (DST): UTC+02:00 (CEST)
- INSEE/Postal code: 45032 /45210
- ^{1} French Land Register data, which excludes lakes, ponds, glaciers > 1 km^{2} (0.386 sq mi or 247 acres) and river estuaries.

Le Bignon-Mirabeau (French pronunciation: [lə biɲɔ̃ miʁabo]) is a commune in the Loiret department in the Centre-Val de Loire region of France.

Originally called simply Le Bignon, the small village is approximately 90 kilometres (56 mi) south of Paris, situated between the communes of Montargis to the south and Nemours to the north.

== Population ==
Historical population
Year	Pop.	±% p.a.
1968	236	—
1975	178	−3.95%
1982	198	+1.53%
1990	197	−0.06%
1999	261	+3.18%
2007	261	+0.00%
2012	312	+3.63%
2017	323	+0.70%
2023	303	−1.06%
Source: INSEE

== Comte de Mirabeau ==
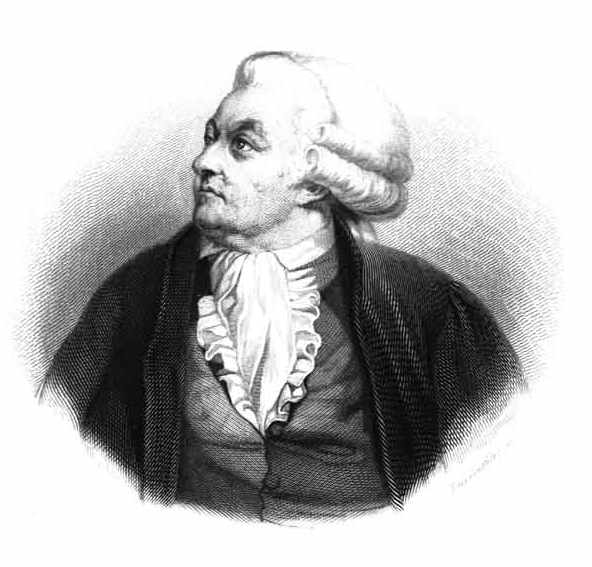
Honoré Gabriel Riqueti, comte de Mirabeau (1749–1791)

The commune was the birthplace of one of the most celebrated figures of the French Revolution, the comte de Mirabeau. The future orator and statesman was born in the Chateau de Bignon on 4 April 1749.

After Mirabeau's death, the commune's original name was amended to Le Bignon-Mirabeau by a resolution of the Municipal Council on 1 November 1792. The name eventually passed out of favor but was officially and permanently restored in the 1880s. A bronze statue of Mirabeau was erected in the commune to commemorate the restoration of the name.

== See also ==
- Communes of the Loiret department
