= Mignères =

- Commune
- Location of Mignères
- Location within France Location within Centre-Val de Loire
- Coordinates: 48°02′50″N 2°37′33″E
- Country: France
- Region: Centre-Val de Loire
- Department: Loiret
- Arrondissement: Montargis
- Canton: Courtenay
- Intercommunality: Quatre Vallées

Government
  - Mayor (2024–2026): Brigitte Cailler
- Area^{1}: 5.12 km^{2} (1.98 sq mi)
- Highest elevation: 95 m (312 ft)
- Lowest elevation: 83 m (272 ft)
- Population (2023): 308
  - Density: 60.2/km^{2} (156/sq mi)
- Time zone: UTC+01:00 (CET)
  - Summer (DST): UTC+02:00 (CEST)
- INSEE/Postal code: 45206 /45490
- ^{1} French Land Register data, which excludes lakes, ponds, glaciers > 1 km^{2} (0.386 sq mi or 247 acres) and river estuaries.

Mignères (French pronunciation: [miɲɛʁ]) is a commune in the Loiret department in north-central France.

== See also ==
- Communes of the Loiret department
