= Forest of Orléans =

Forest in France

Forest of Orléans Forêt d'Orléans
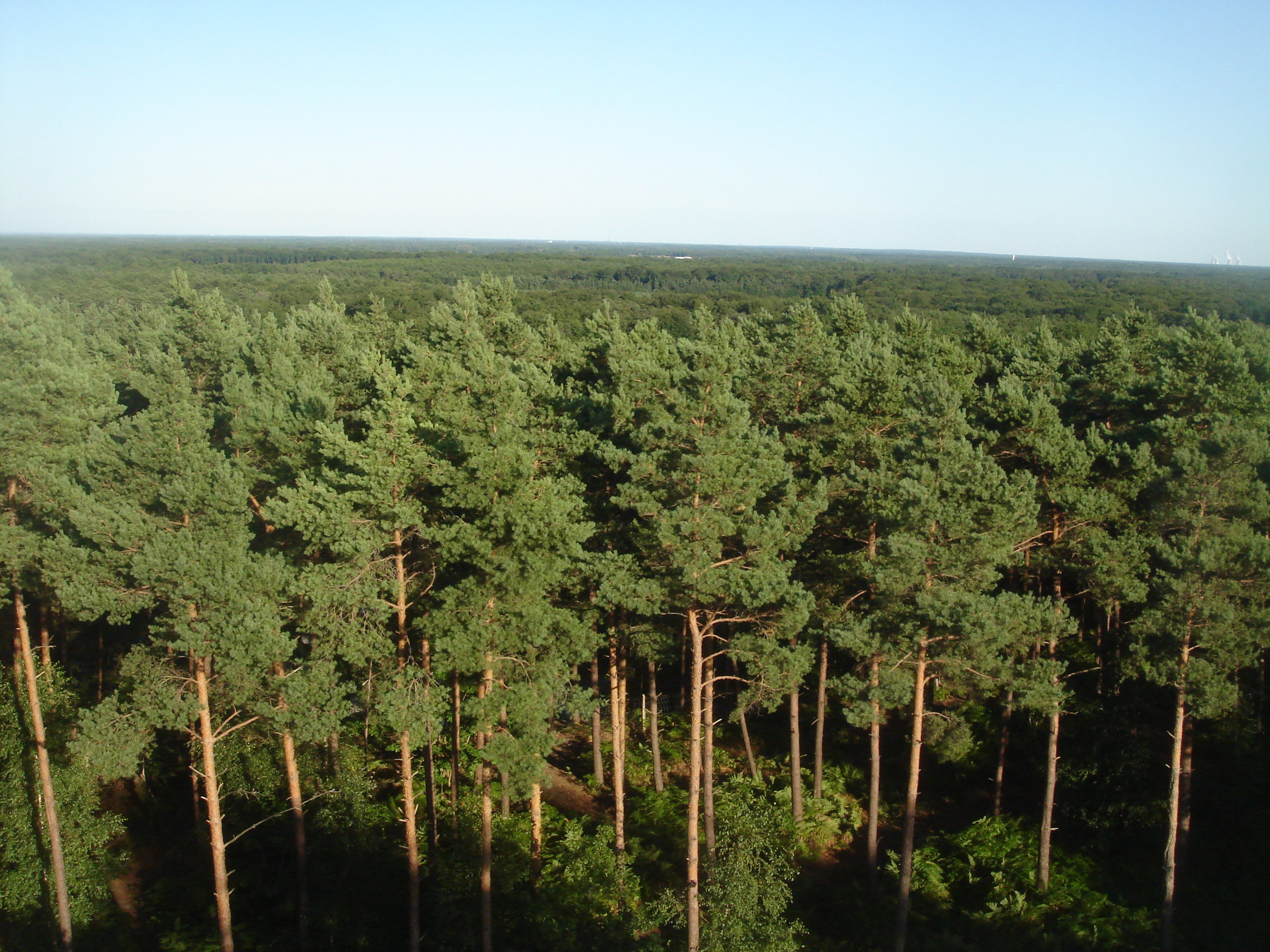

- Location within France

Geography
- Location: Loiret, Centre-Val de Loire, France
- Coordinates: 48°00′28″N 2°09′39″E
- Elevation: min. 107 m — max. 174 m
- Area: 50 000 ha (about 35 000 of which is the national forest)

Administration
- Status: national forest
- Authority: National Forests Office

Forest of Orléans (French: Forêt d'Orléans) is a French national forest for the most part and makes up 70% of a French natural region, located in the department of Loiret in the Centre-Val de Loire region.

Its former name is "Forêt des Loges".

== Geography ==
Forest of Orléans ranges over 50,000 hectares, including 35,000 hectares which make up the national forest, the remainder being privately owned. It is in fact the largest French national forest. Thirty-five communes take part in it. The forest is surrounded by the natural regions of Beauce, Gâtinais, and Loire Valley; it extends along the North of Loire river in an arc which is 60 km in length, from Orléans to Gien, and 5 to 20 km in width.

=== Routes and railroads ===
The national routes 60 and 152 cross the forest of Orléans. It is bordered to the West by the national route 20 and the highway A10, to the East by national route 7 and Highway A77, and to the North by Highway A19.

Two railroads cross the forest, between Orléans and Neuville-aux-Bois via Rebréchien, and between Orléans and Bellegarde via Vennecy and Vitry-aux-Loges.

Two GR footpaths cross the forest of Orléans, GR 3 and GR 32.

=== Communes ===
These communes are partly or entirely in the forest of Orléans:

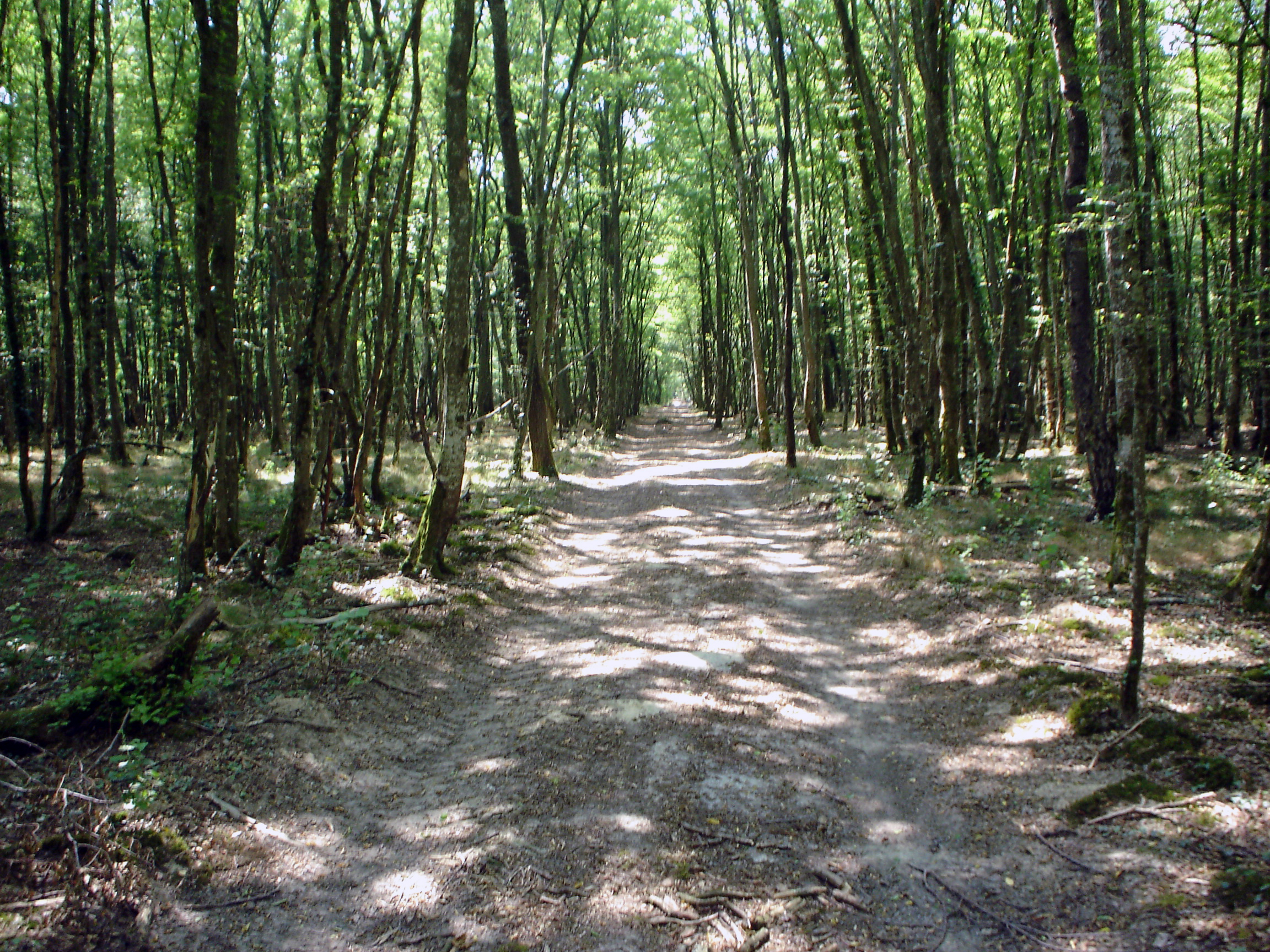
Forest of Orléans in Saran

- Boigny-sur-Bionne
- Boiscommun
- Les Bordes
- Bougy-lez-Neuville
- Bouzy-la-Forêt
- Bray-en-Val
- Cercottes
- Chambon-la-Forêt
- Chanteau
- Châteauneuf-sur-Loire
- Châtenoy
- Chevilly
- Chilleurs-aux-Bois
- Les Choux
- Combreux
- Coudroy
- Courcy-aux-Loges
- Dampierre-en-Burly
- Fay-aux-Loges
- Fleury-les-Aubrais
- Ingrannes
- Lorris
- Loury
- Marigny-les-Usages
- Le Moulinet-sur-Solin
- Montereau
- Nesploy
- Neuville-aux-Bois
- Nibelle
- Ouzouer-sur-Loire
- Rebréchien
- Saint-Jean-de-Braye
- Saint-Lyé-la-Forêt
- Saran
- Seichebrières
- Semoy
- Sully-la-Chapelle
- Saint-Martin-d'Abbat
- Sury-aux-Bois
- Traînou
- Vieilles-Maisons-sur-Joudry
- Vitry-aux-Loges
- Vrigny

=== Relief and humidity ===
The forest is more or less flat, the maximum altitude being 177 m and the lowest 107 m, hence an altitude difference of 70 meters across 50 000 hectares.

This absence of relief, joined with the impermeability of the soil prevents the natural flow of rainwater and explains the humidity of the terrain and abundance of ponds.

== Flora and fauna ==
The forest is mixed. Among the species, common oak makes up over the half of the trees. The resinous trees are mainly Scots pine, which make up a third. Other than these two species, there are equal amounts of birch, hornbeam, European beech, hazel, Corsican black pine, wild apple trees, and lime trees. Many bird species nest in the forest of Orléans. There can be observed ospreys (returned in 1984), booted eagles, short-toed snake eagles, European honey buzzards, hen harriers, European nightjars, black woodpeckers, middle spotted woodpeckers, grey-headed woodpeckers, woodlarks, and Dartford warblers. Others, such as great egrets and common cranes, sojourn in the forest in course of their migration. Numerous other species of animals can be encountered: red deer, roe deer, hares, pheasants, tree squirrels, wild boars, and common frogs.

=== Main species gallery ===
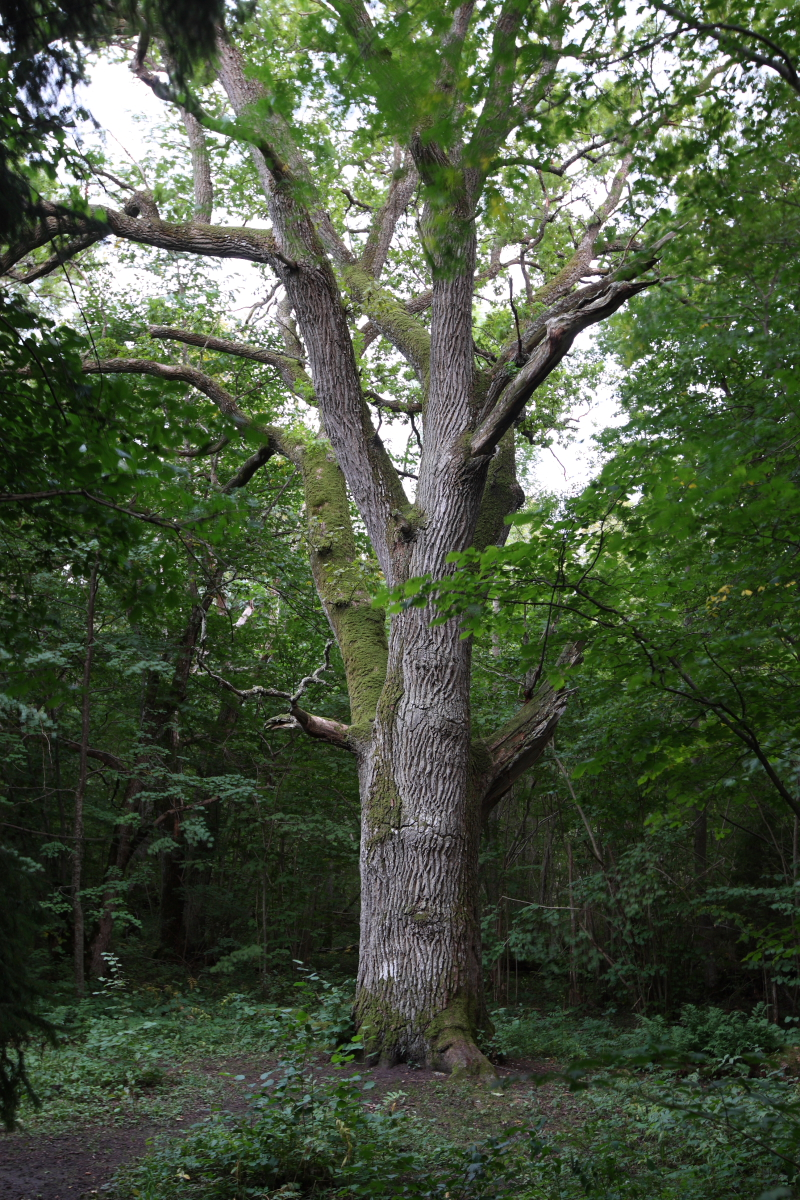
Common oak (Over the half of all trees)

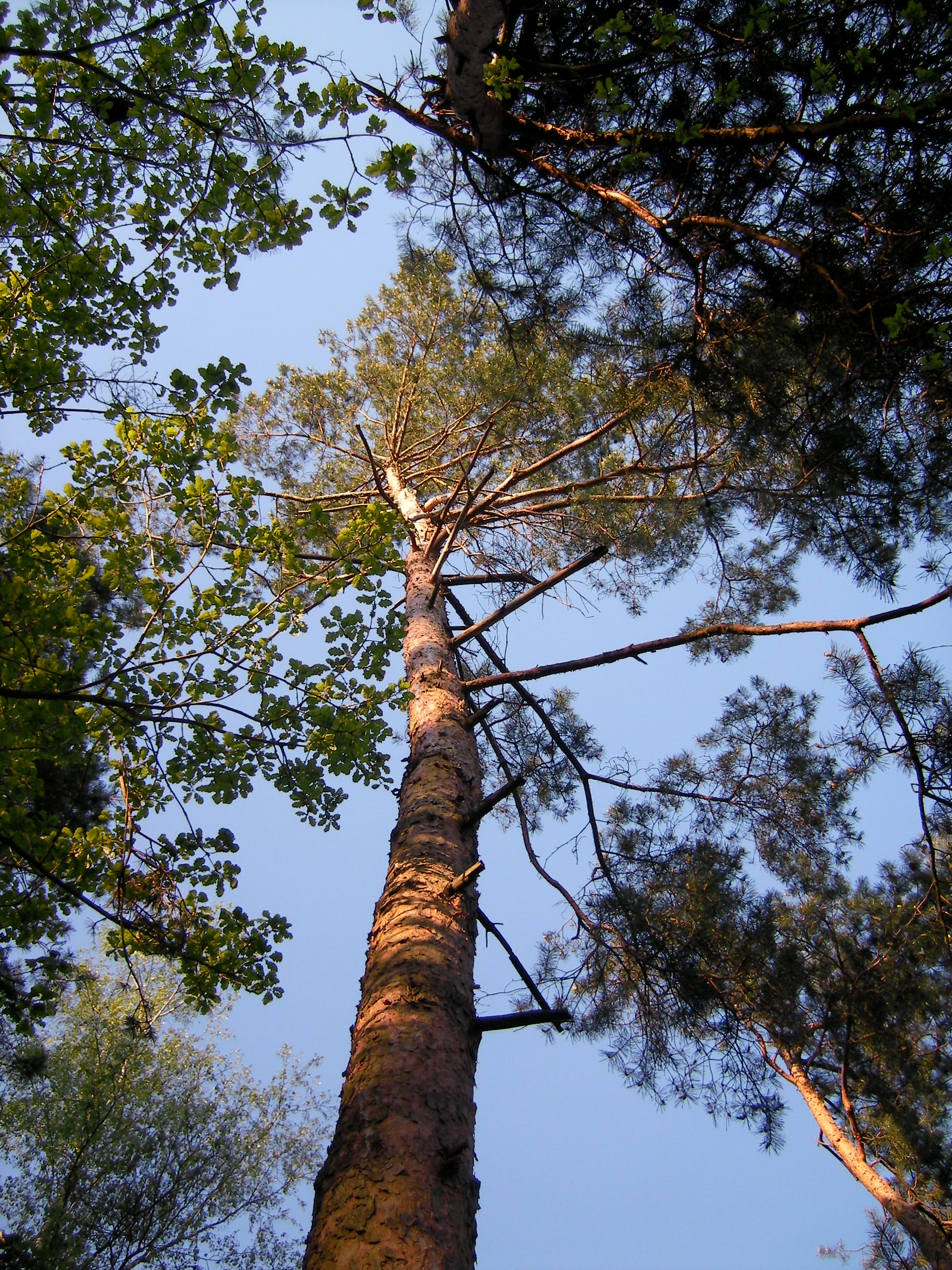
Scots pine (Over the third of all trees)

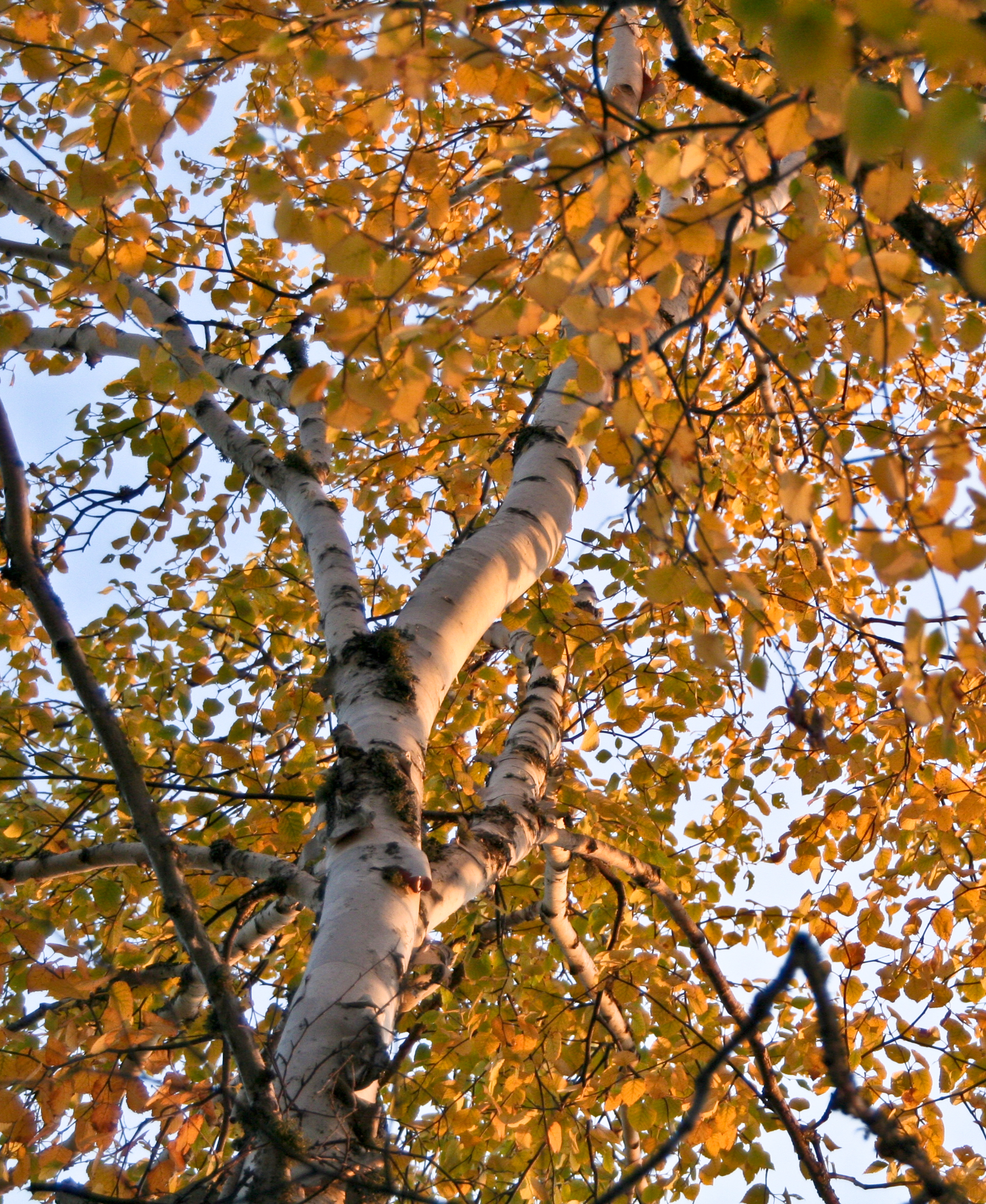
Birch

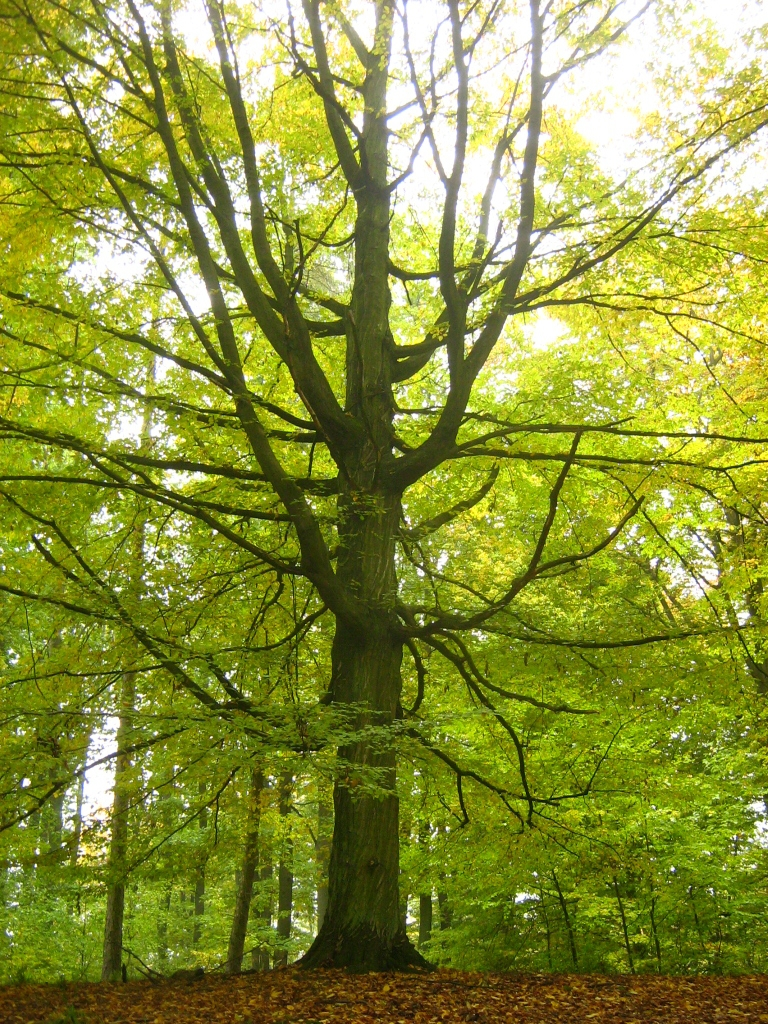
Hornbeam

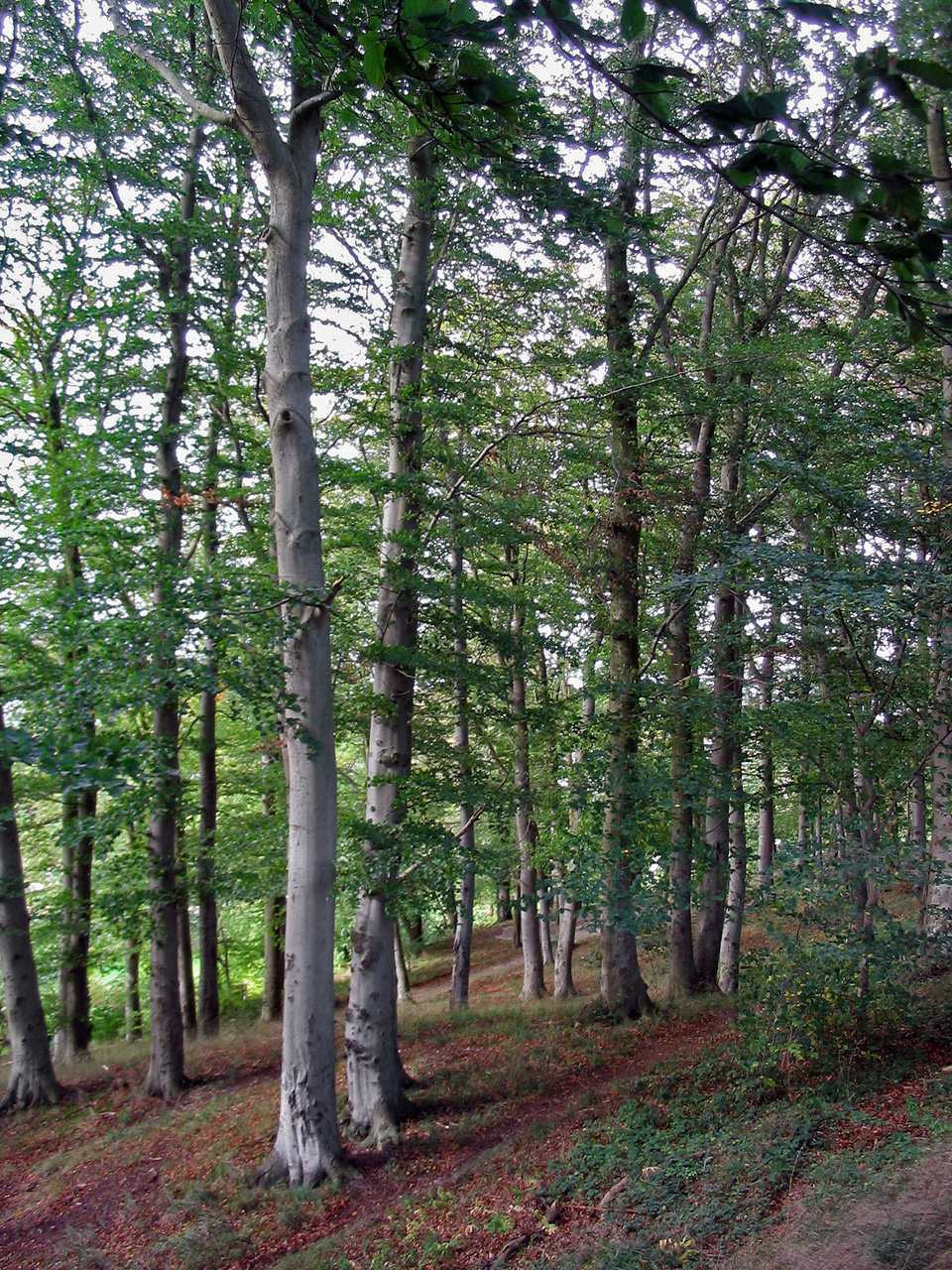
European beech

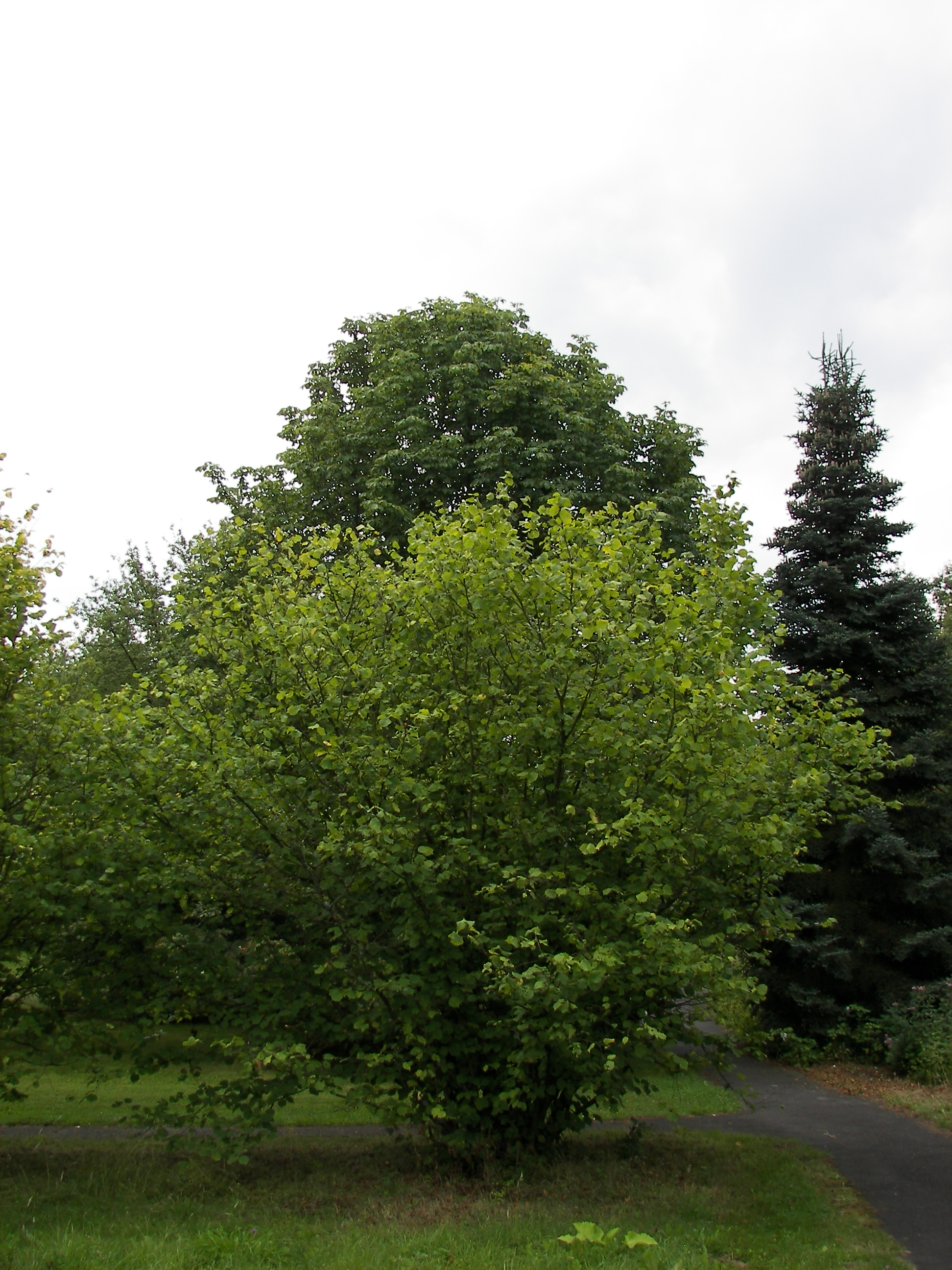
Hazel

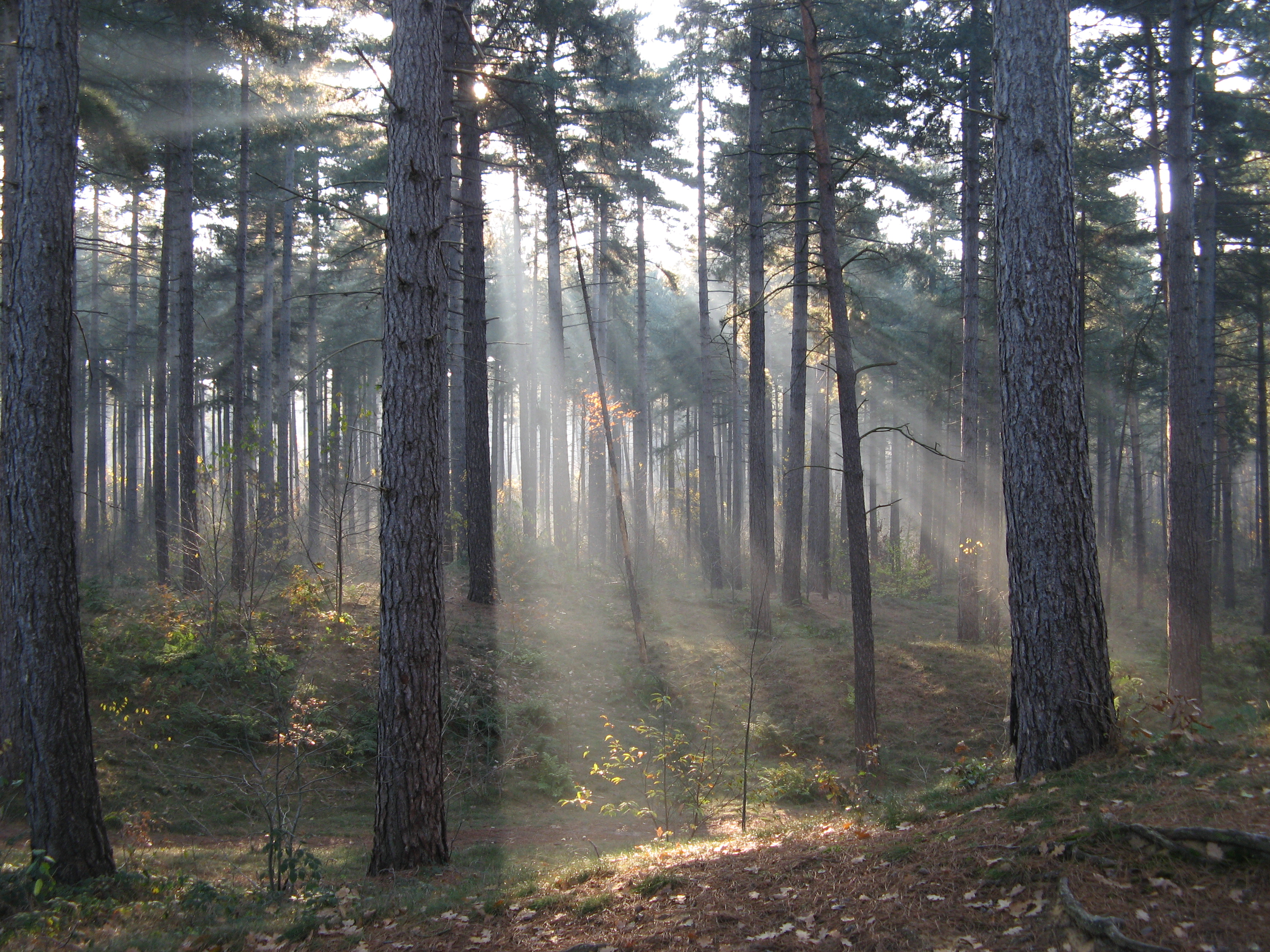
Corsican black pine

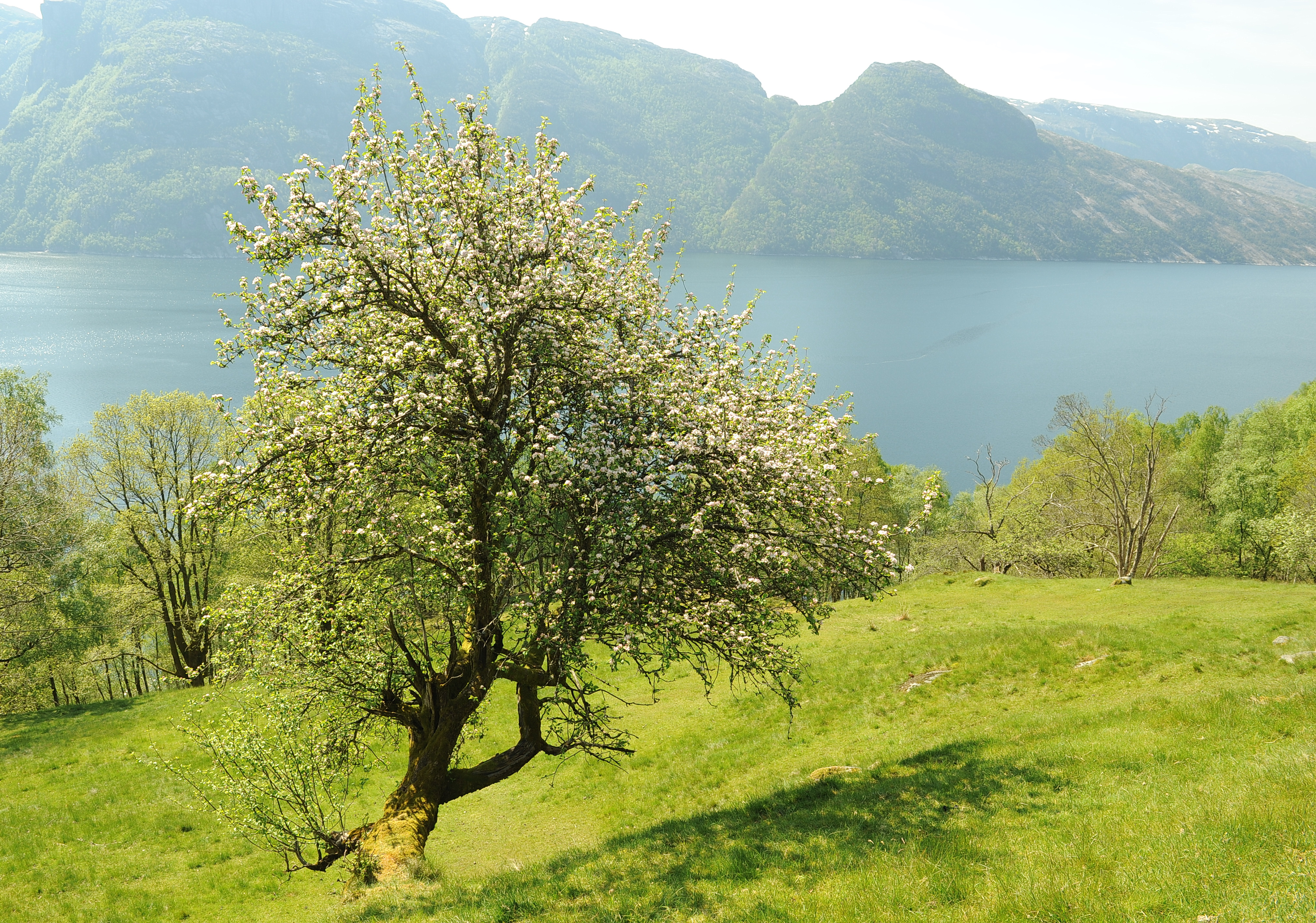
Wild apple tree

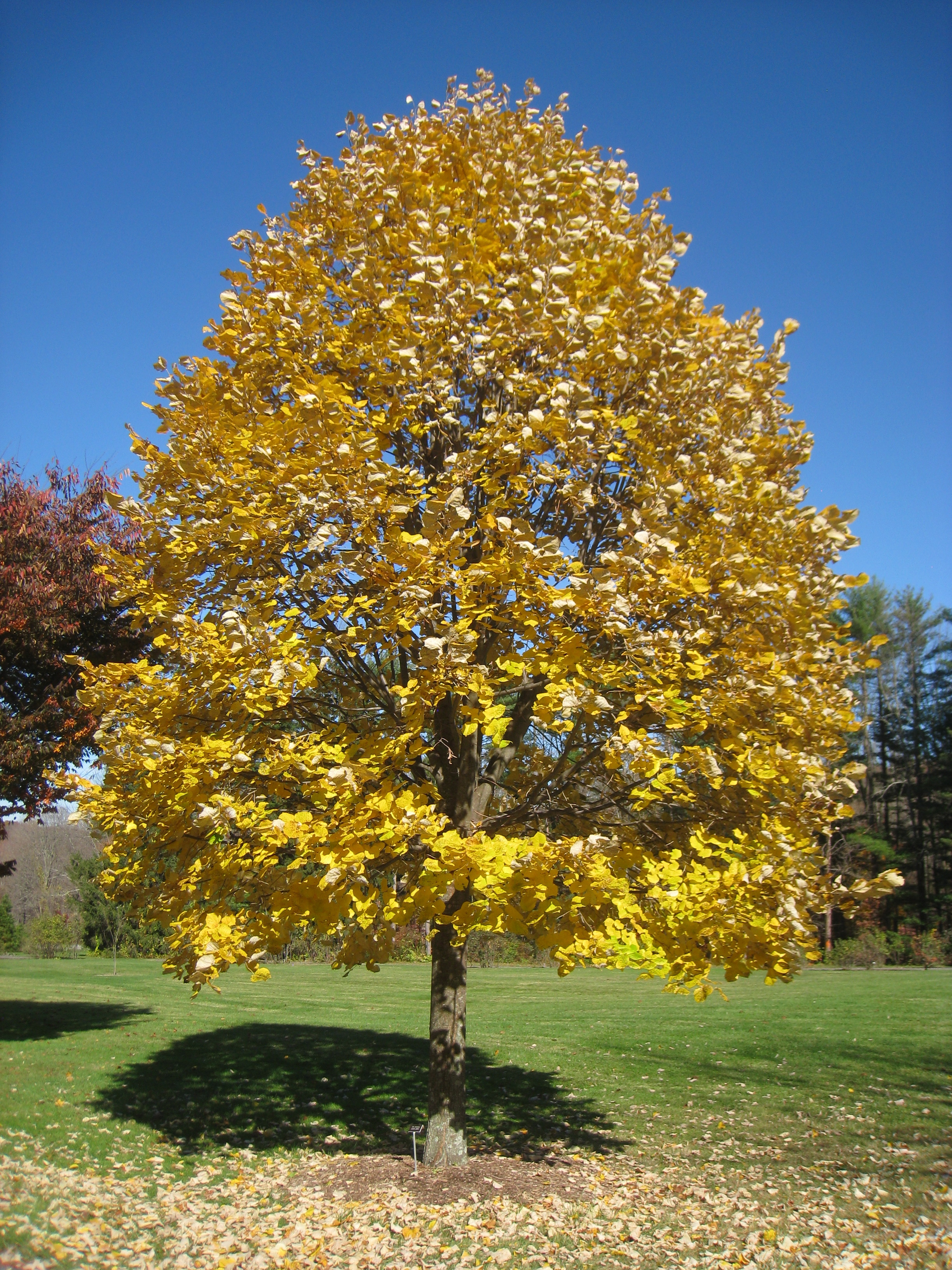
Lime tree

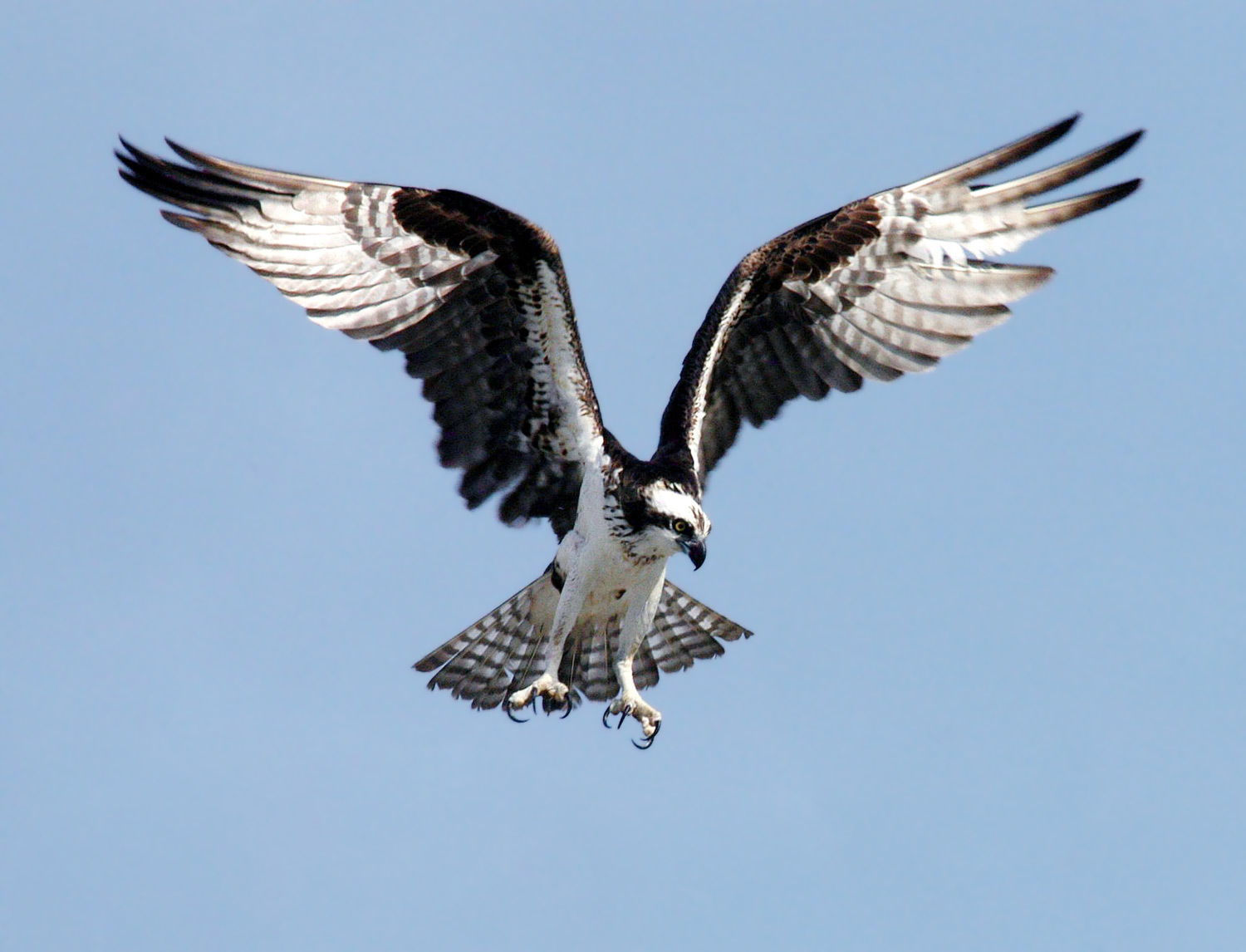
Osprey

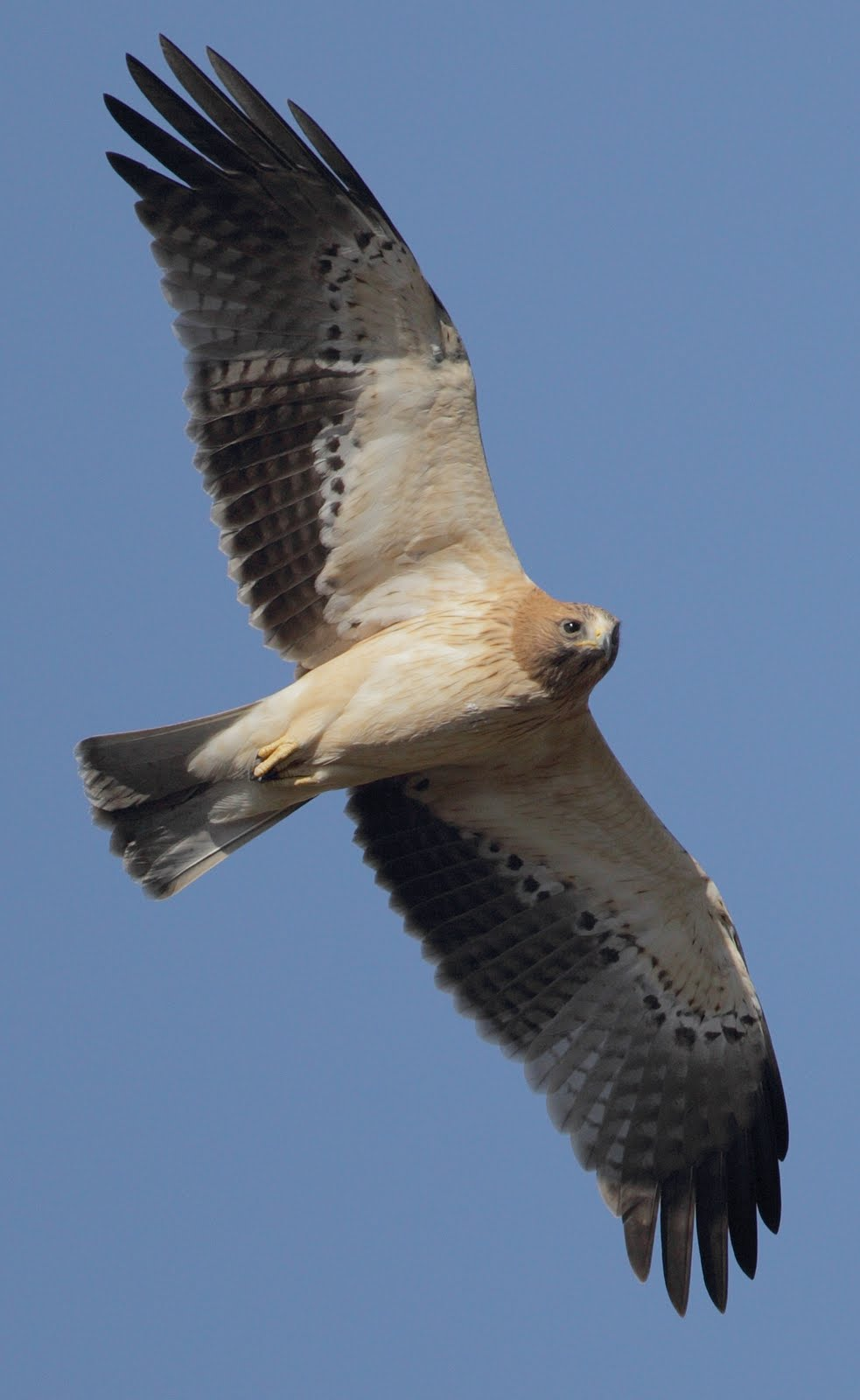
Booted eagle

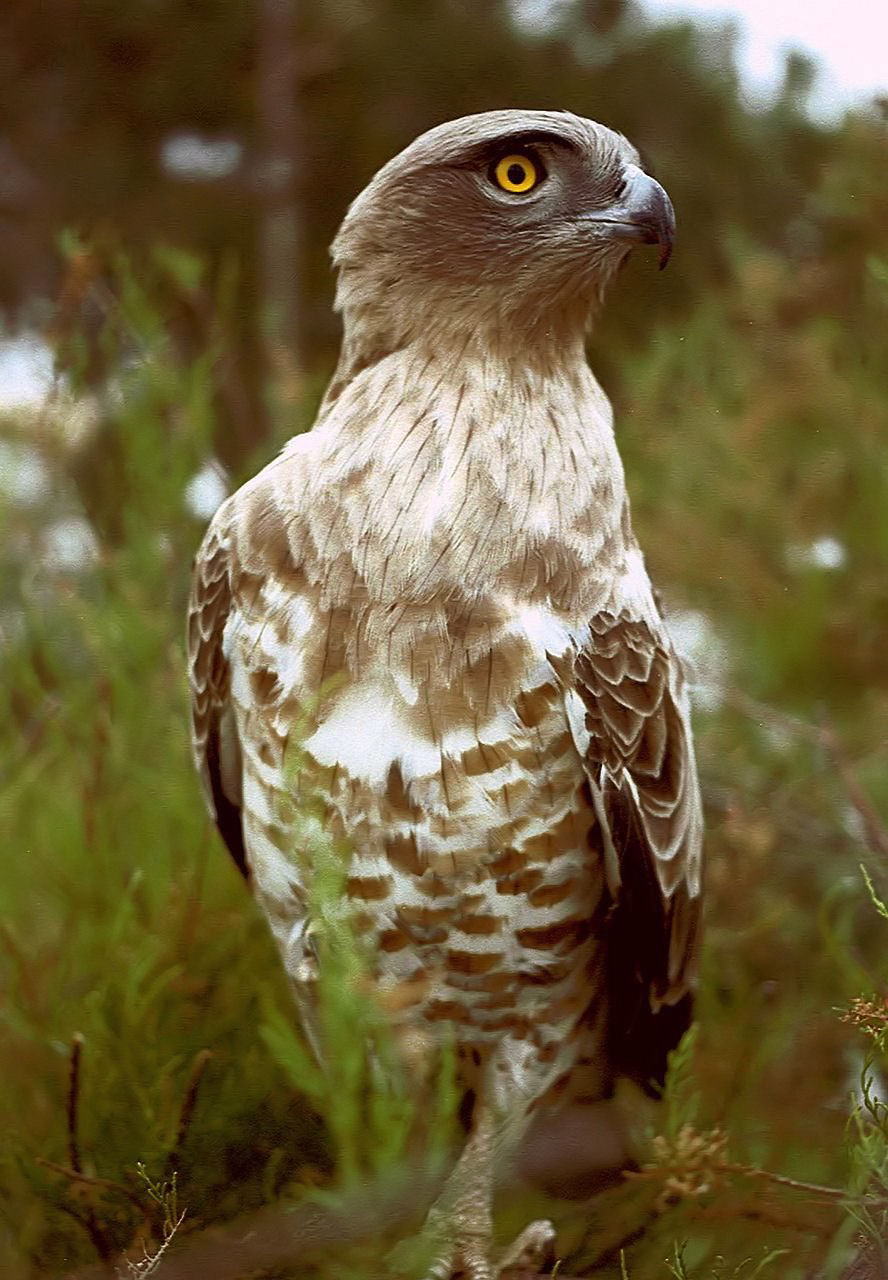
Short-toed snake eagle

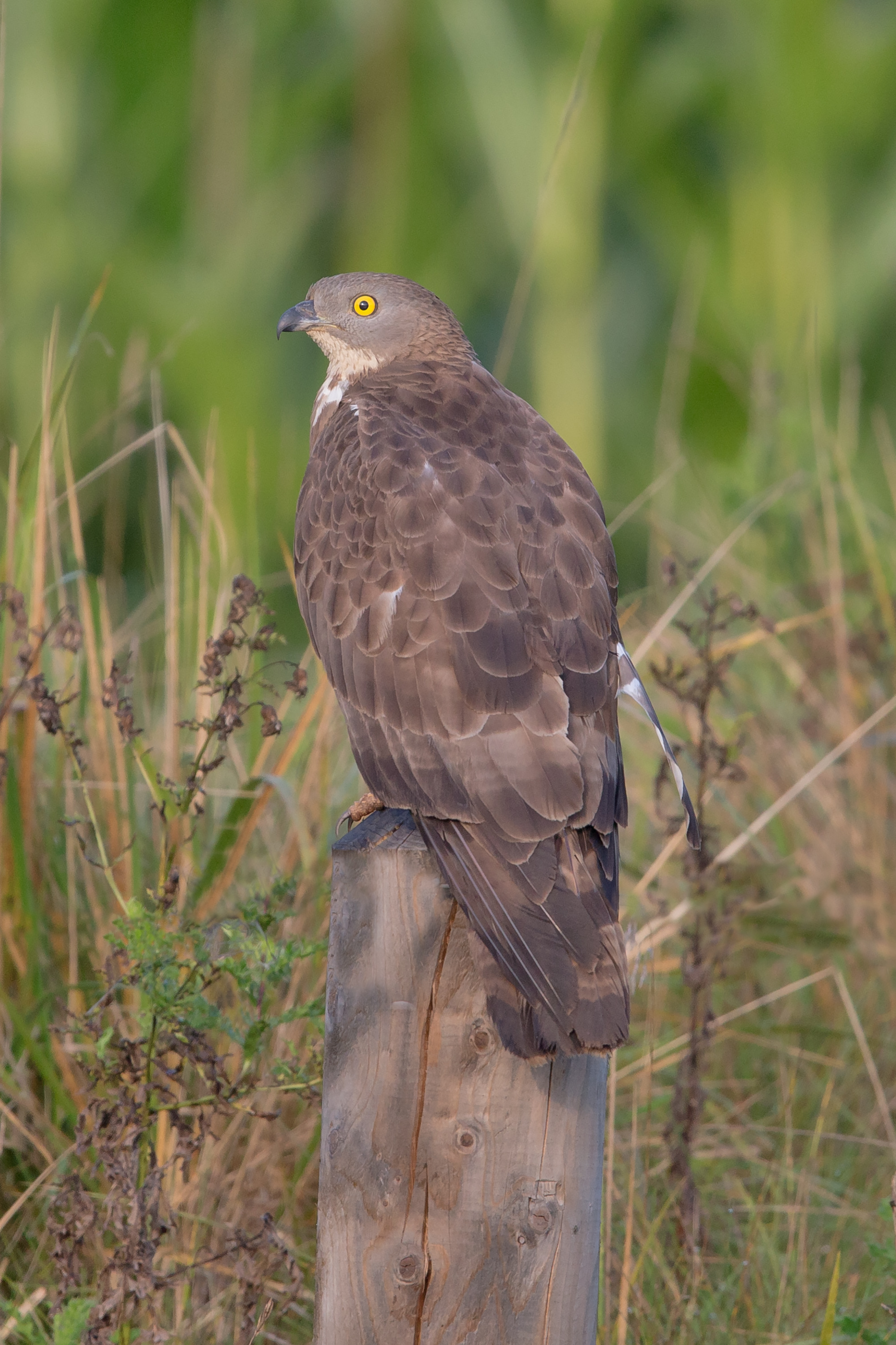
European honey buzzard

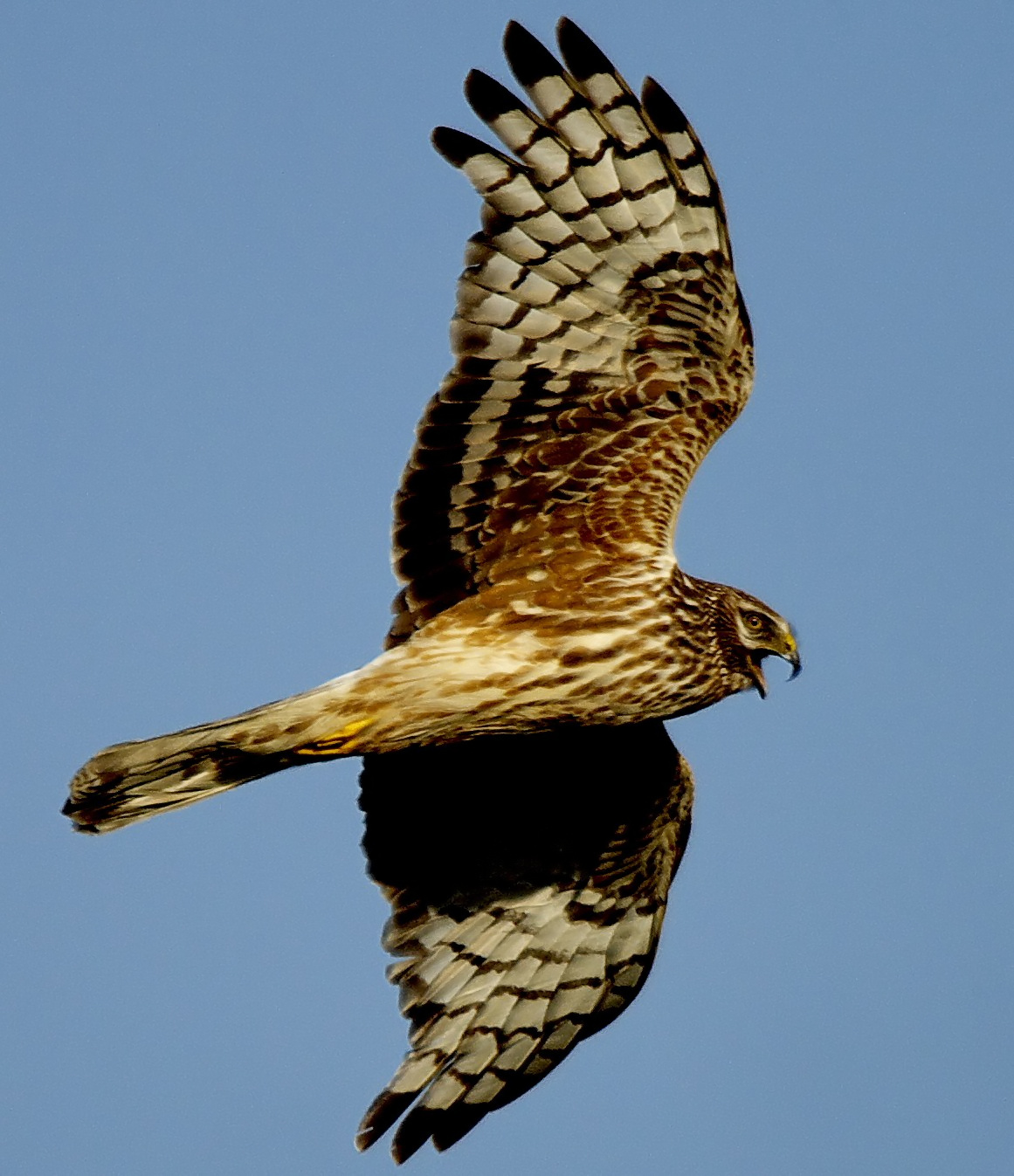
Hen harrier

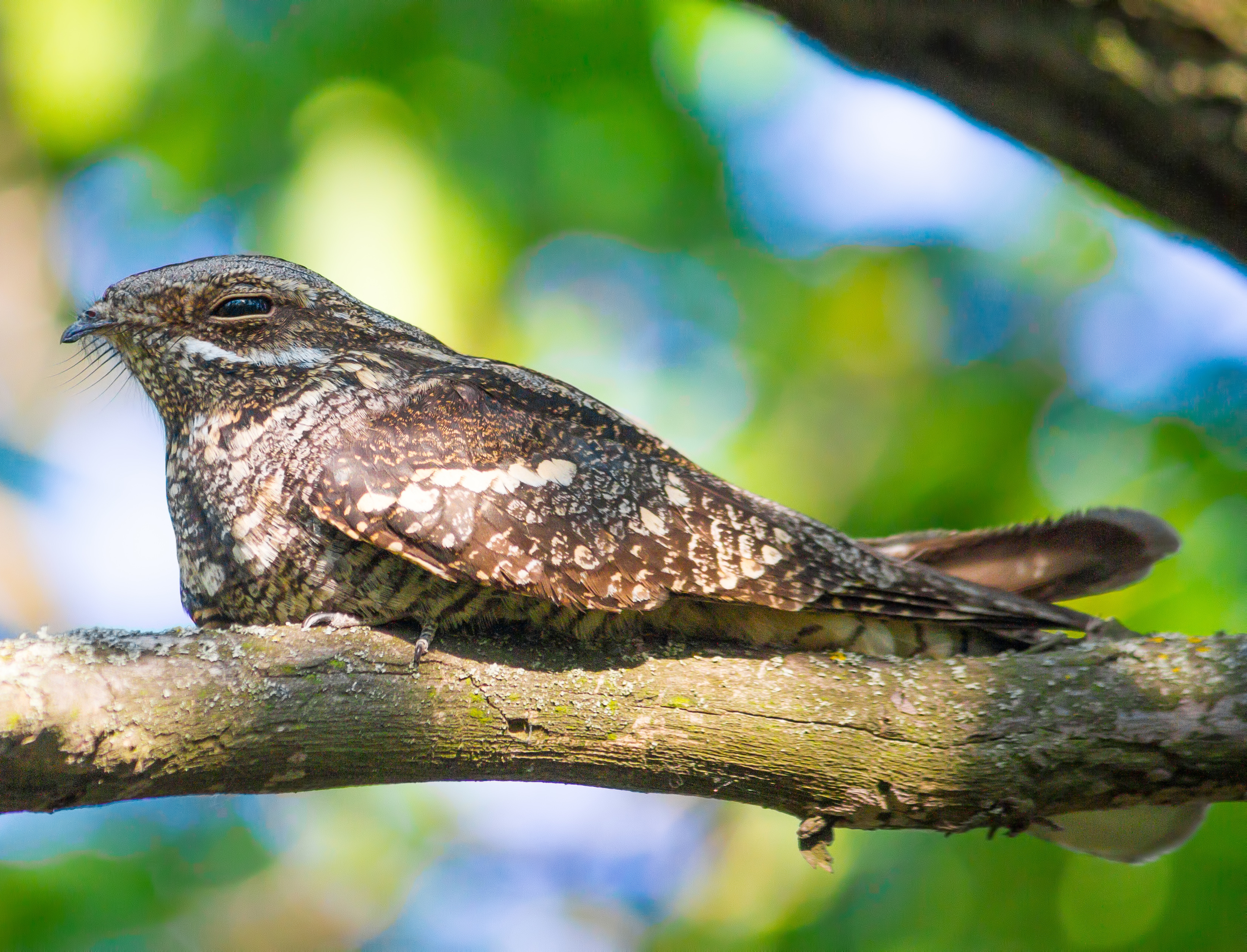
European nightjar

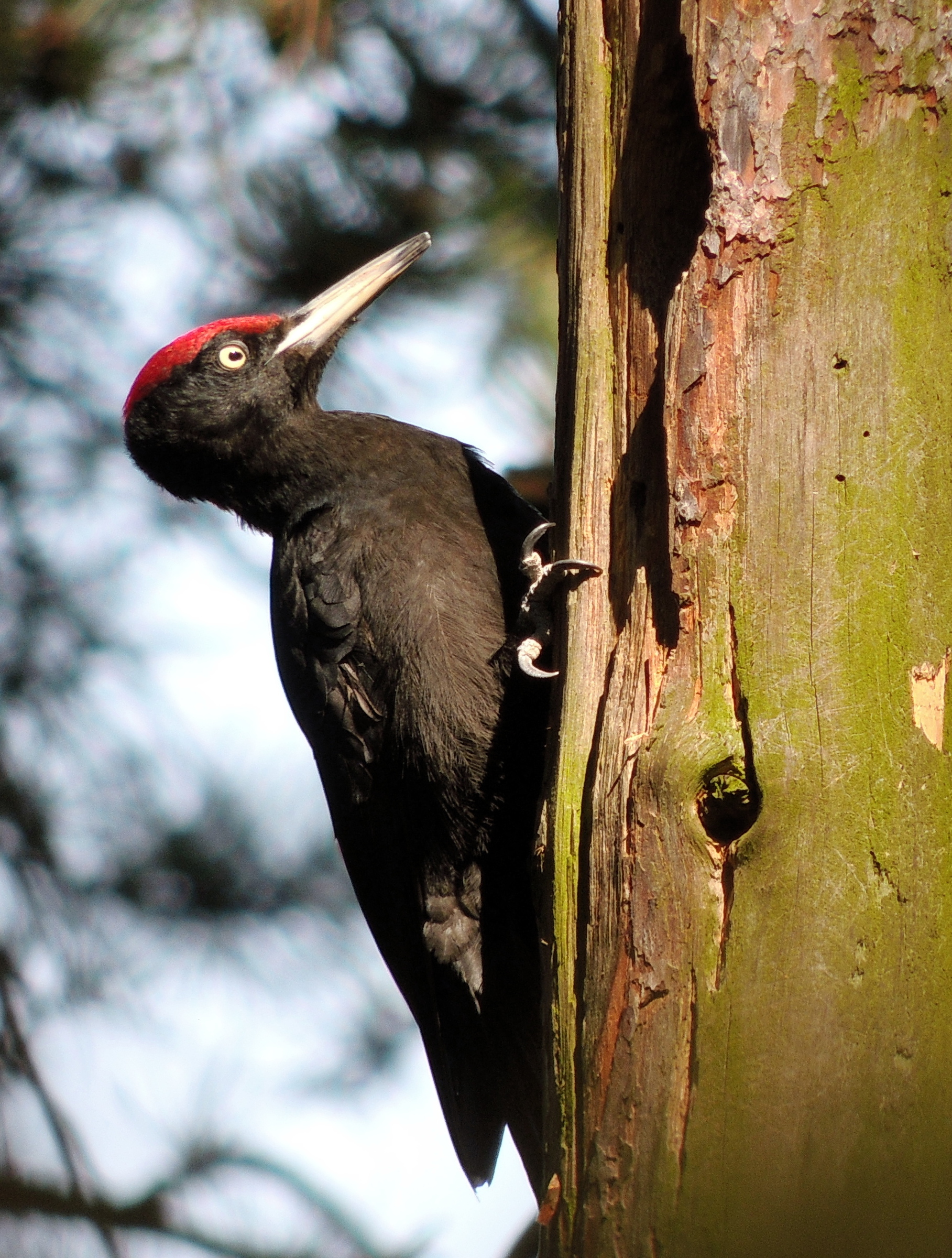
Black woodpecker

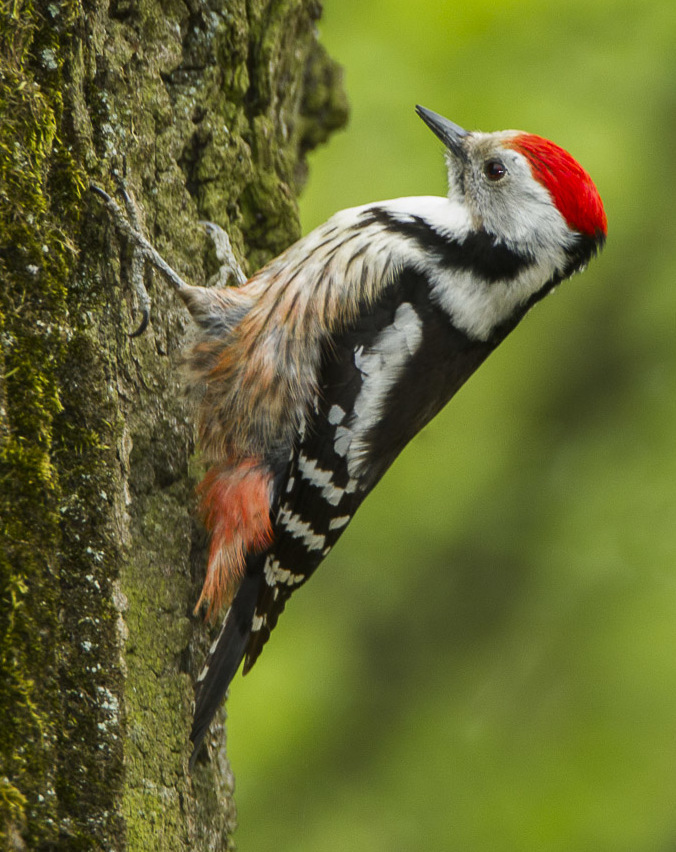
Middle spotted woodpecker

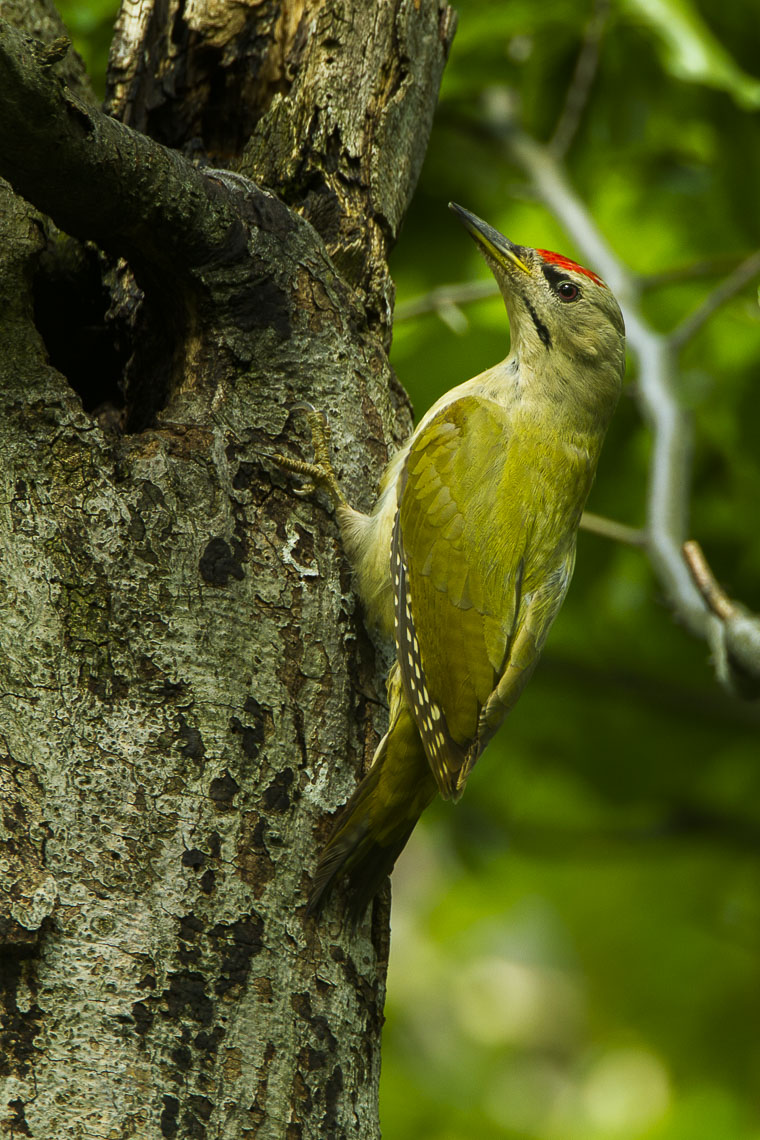
Grey-headed woodpecker

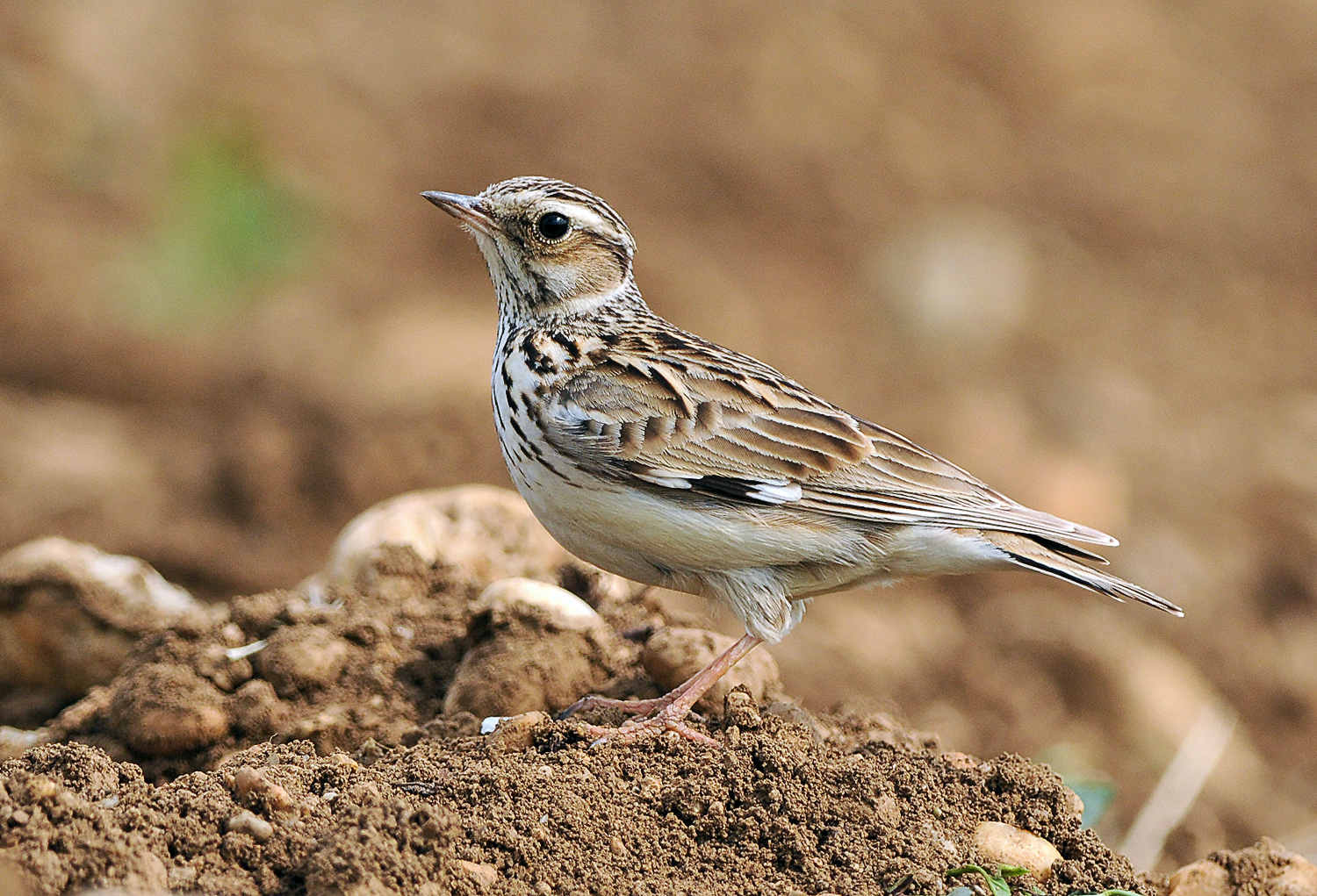
Woodlark

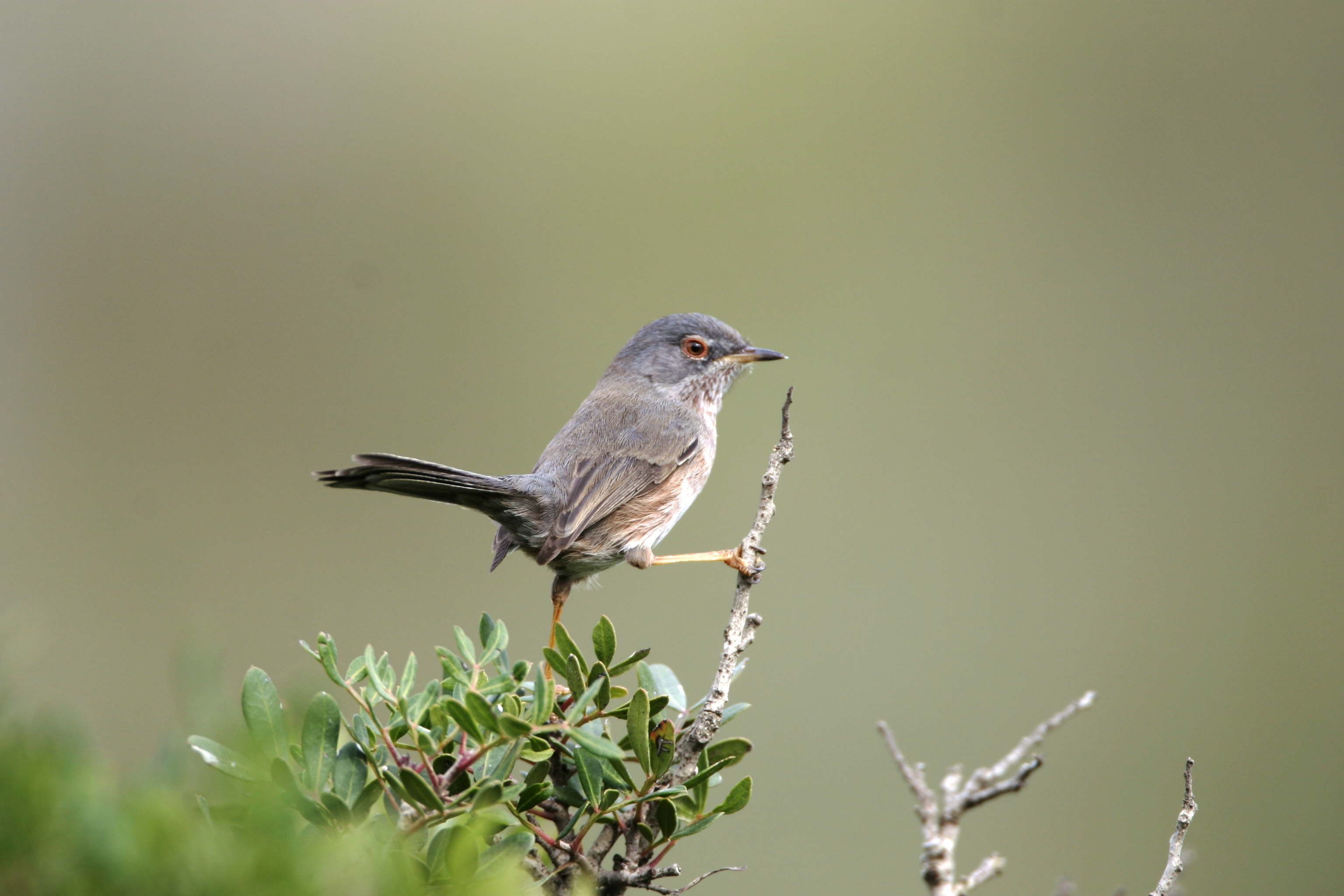
Dartford warbler

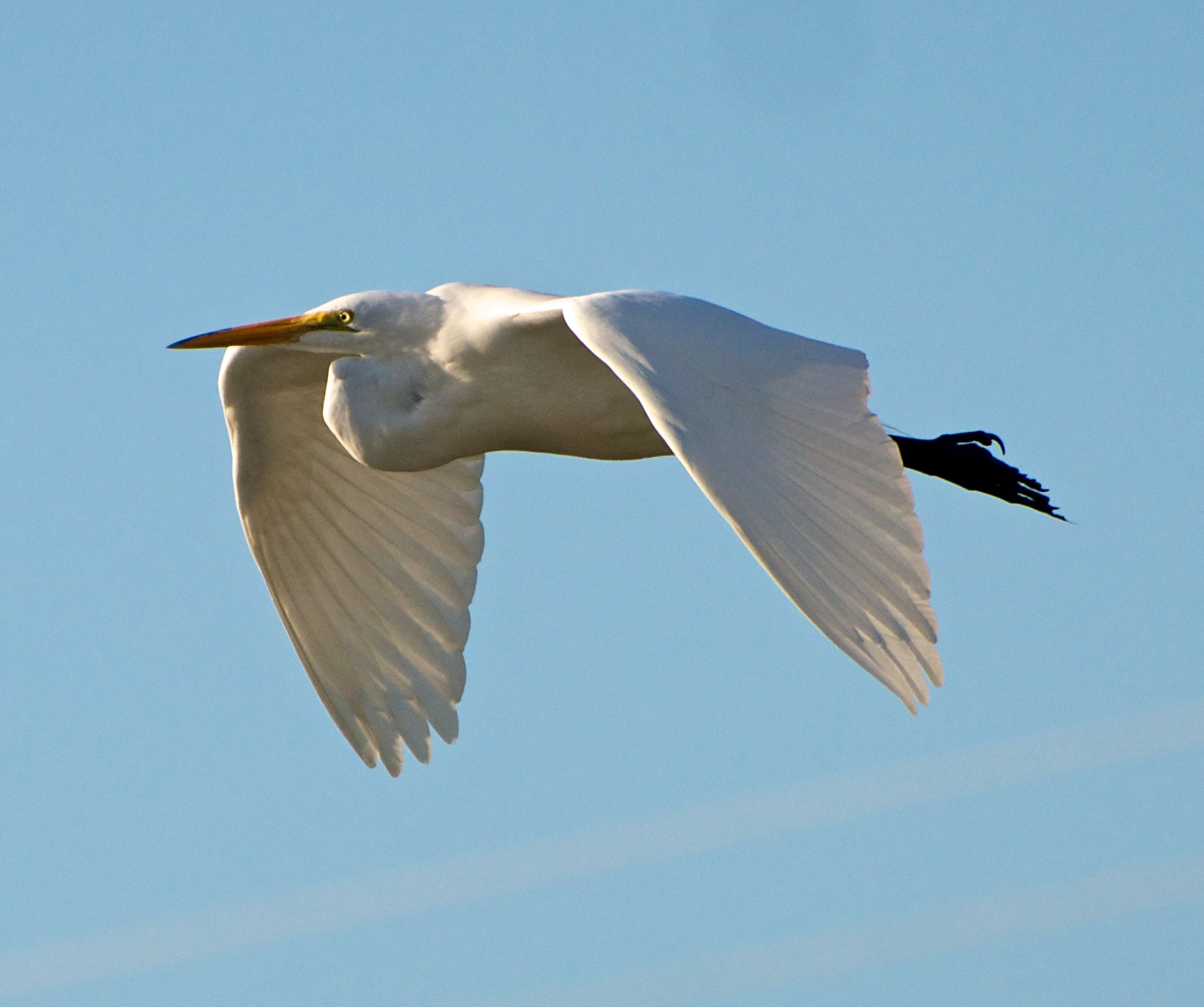
Great egret (Temporary stay in course of migration)

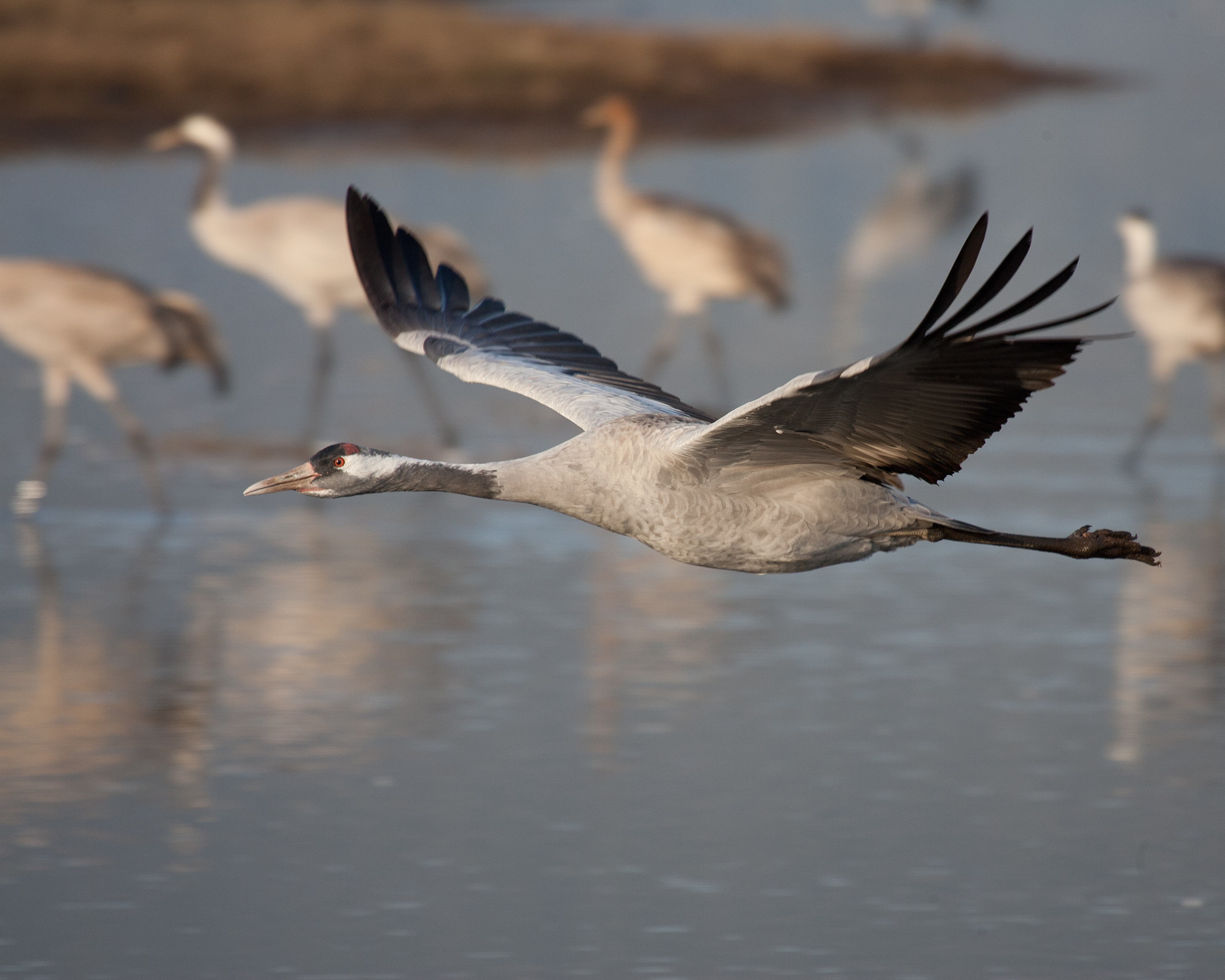
Common crane (Temporary stay in course of migration)

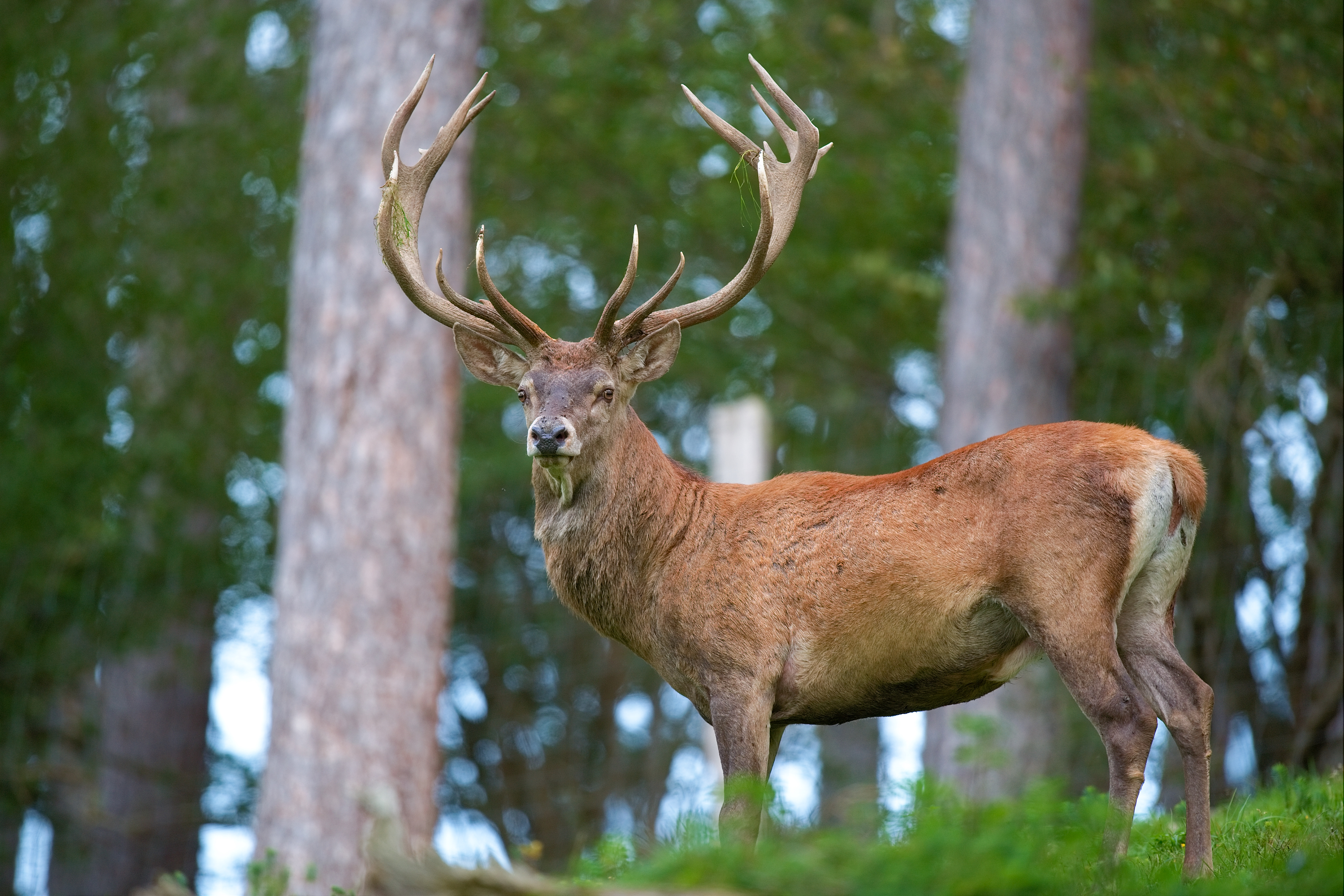
Red deer

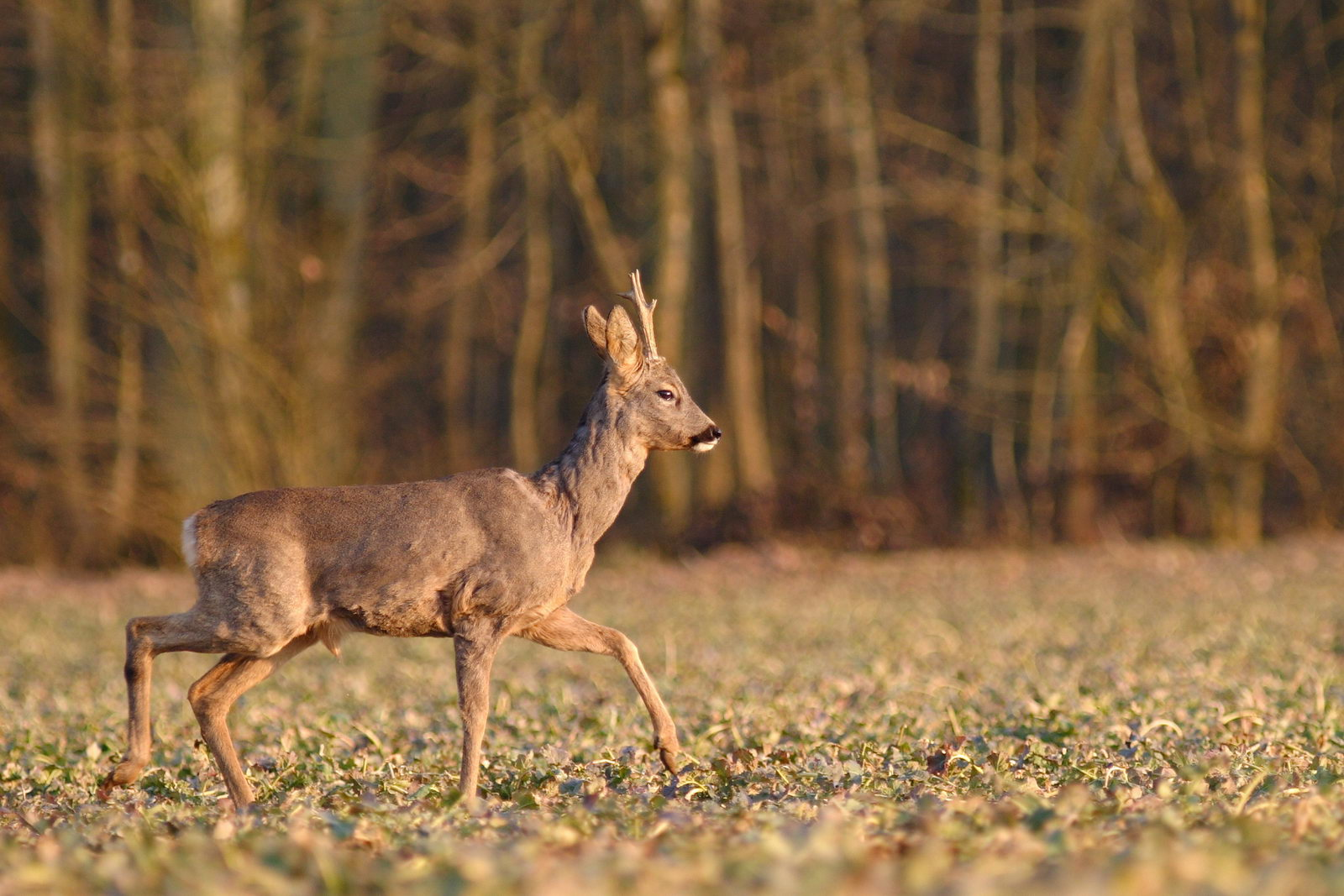
Roe deer

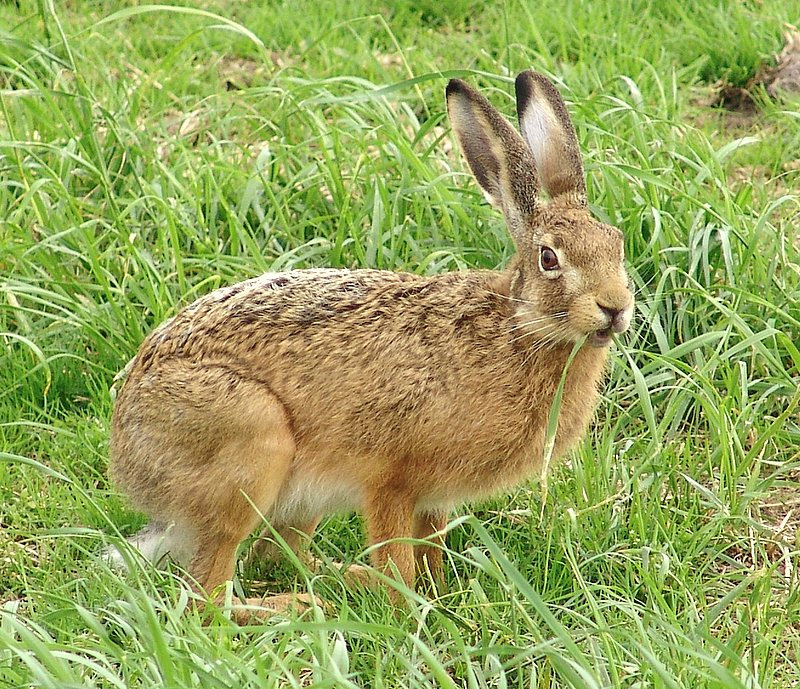
Hare

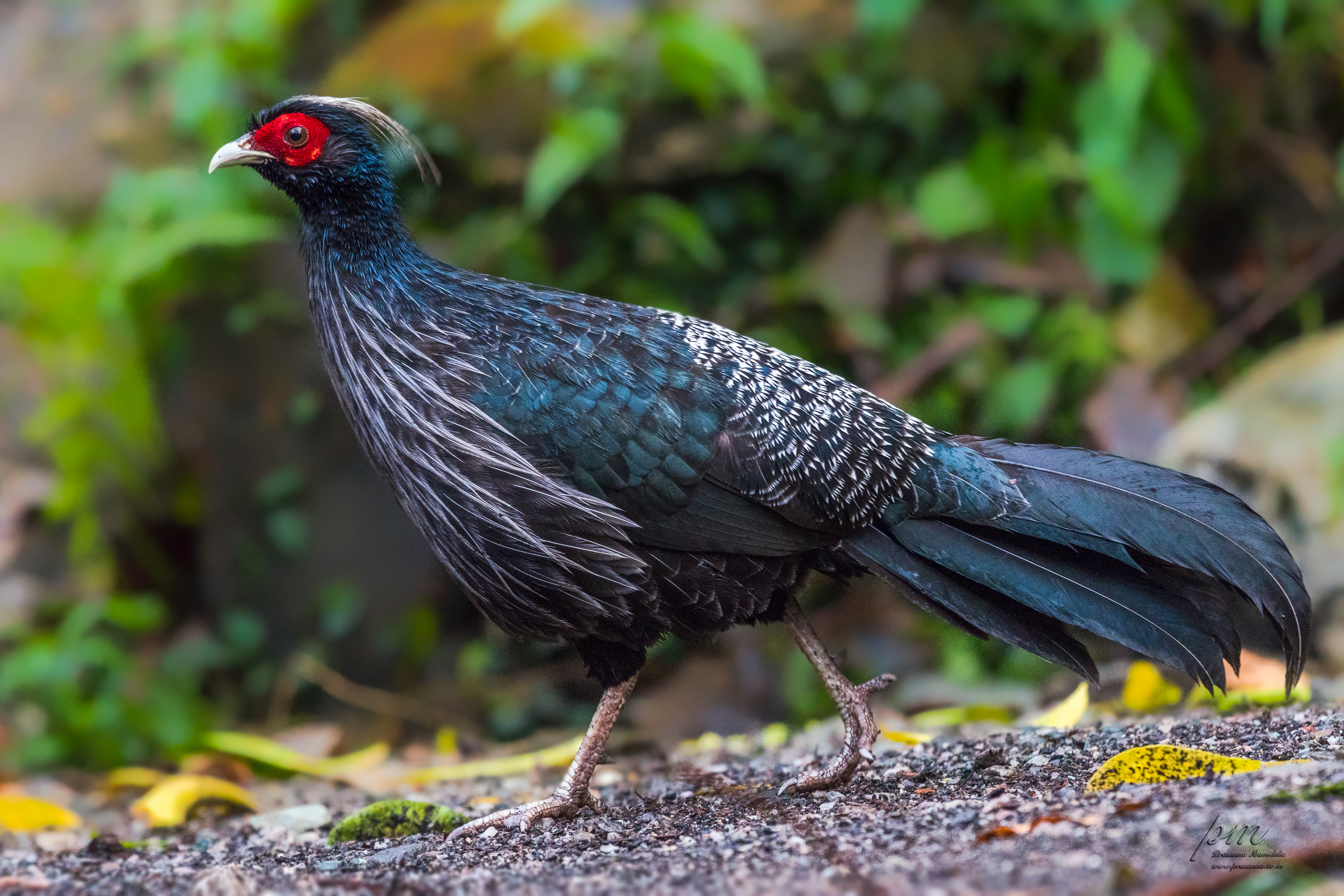
Pheasant

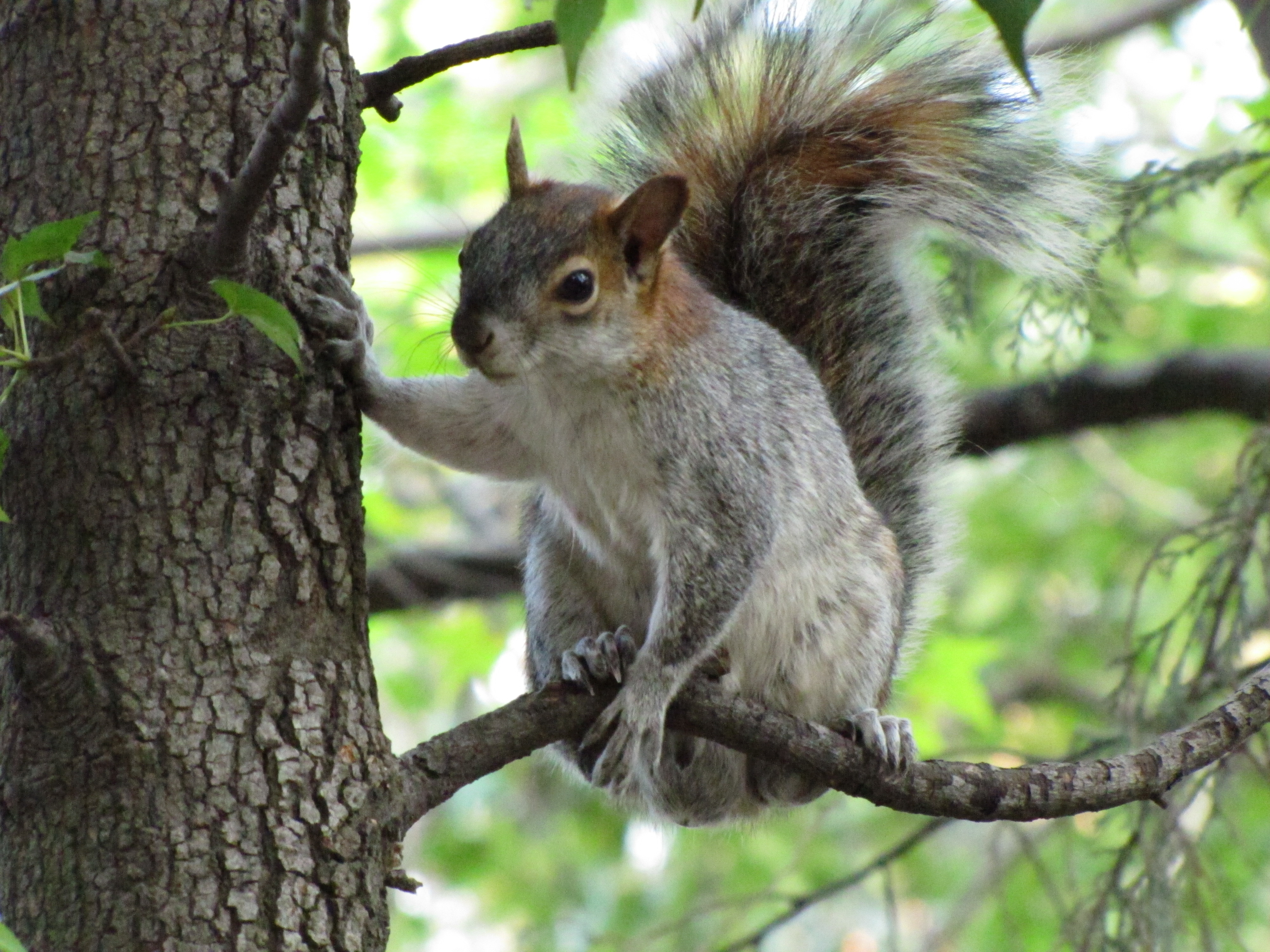
Tree squirrel

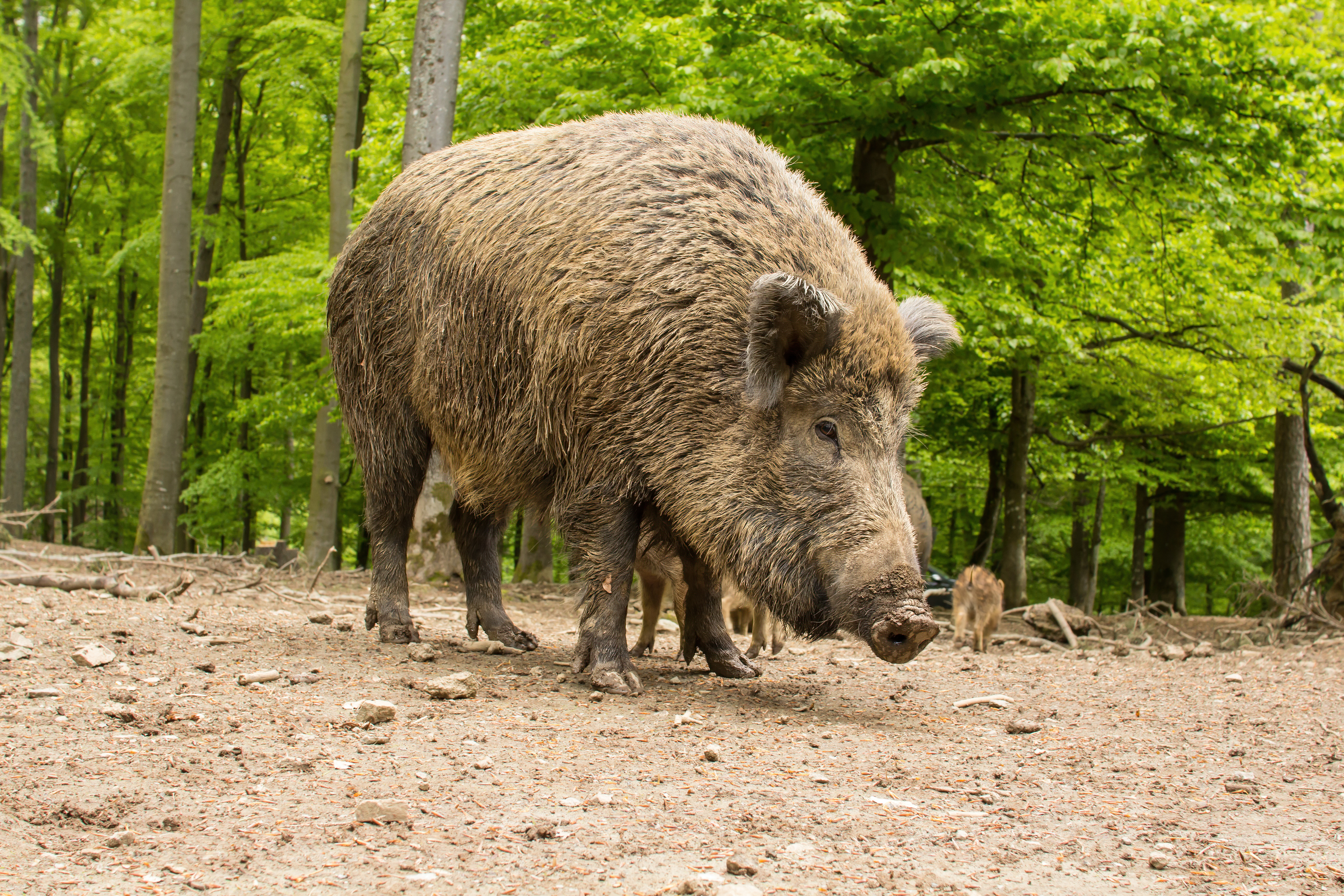
Wild boar

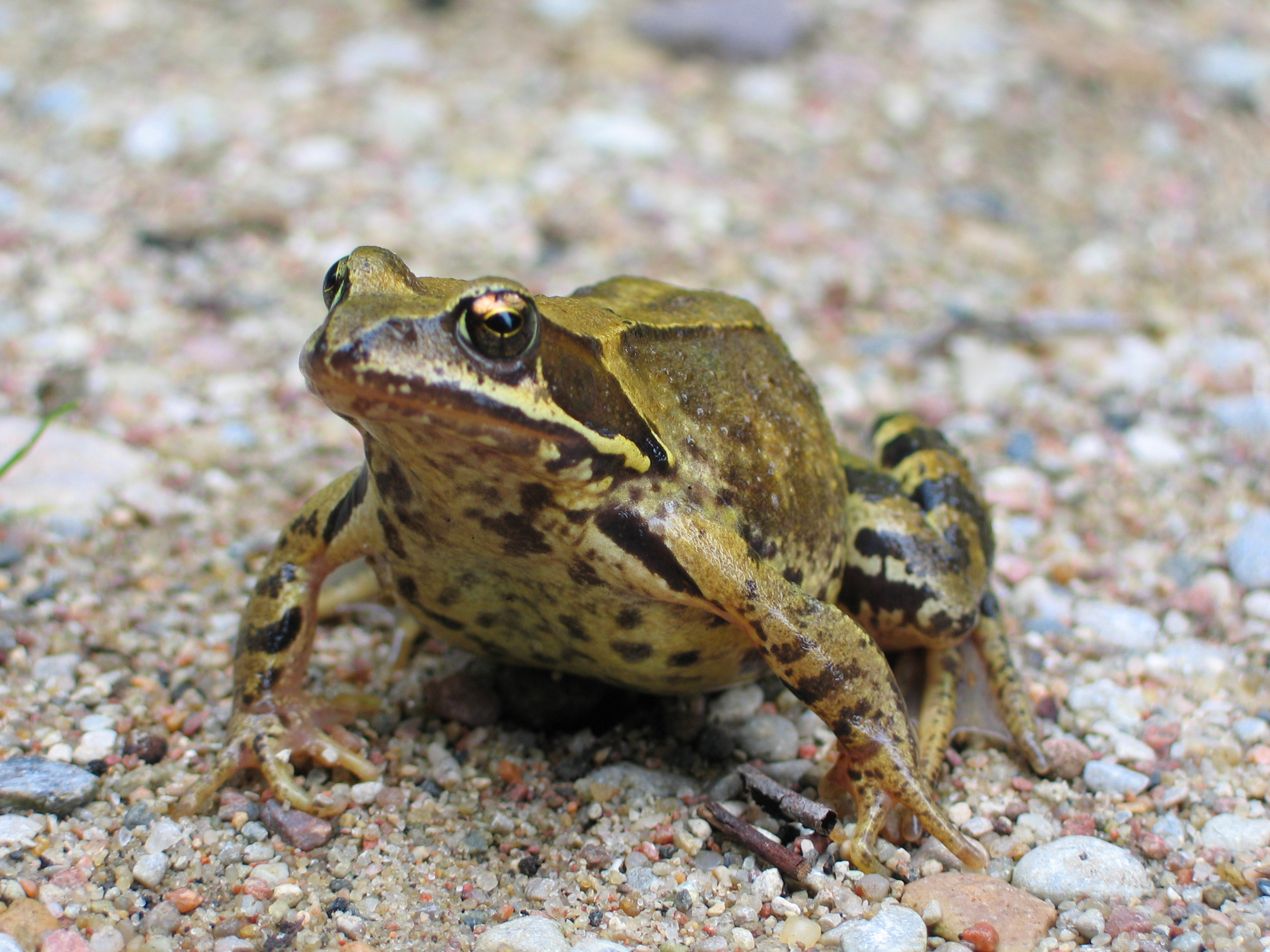
Common frog

== Classification ==
An area of 28 ha of the forest of Orléans was designated a natural zone of ecological interest, fauna and flora. It is mainly of conifers and is of ornithological interest hence the presence of ospreys, nightjars, Eurasian woodcocks, and Eurasian hobbies.

Furthermore, an area of 36,086 ha of the forest north of Loire was designated a natural zone of ecological interest, fauna and flora.

An area of 32,177 ha is under special protection by Natura 2000. It is an Important Bird Area (IBA) that hosts ospreys, booted eagles, middle spotted woodpeckers, and European nightjars.
