= Lorris =

- Commune
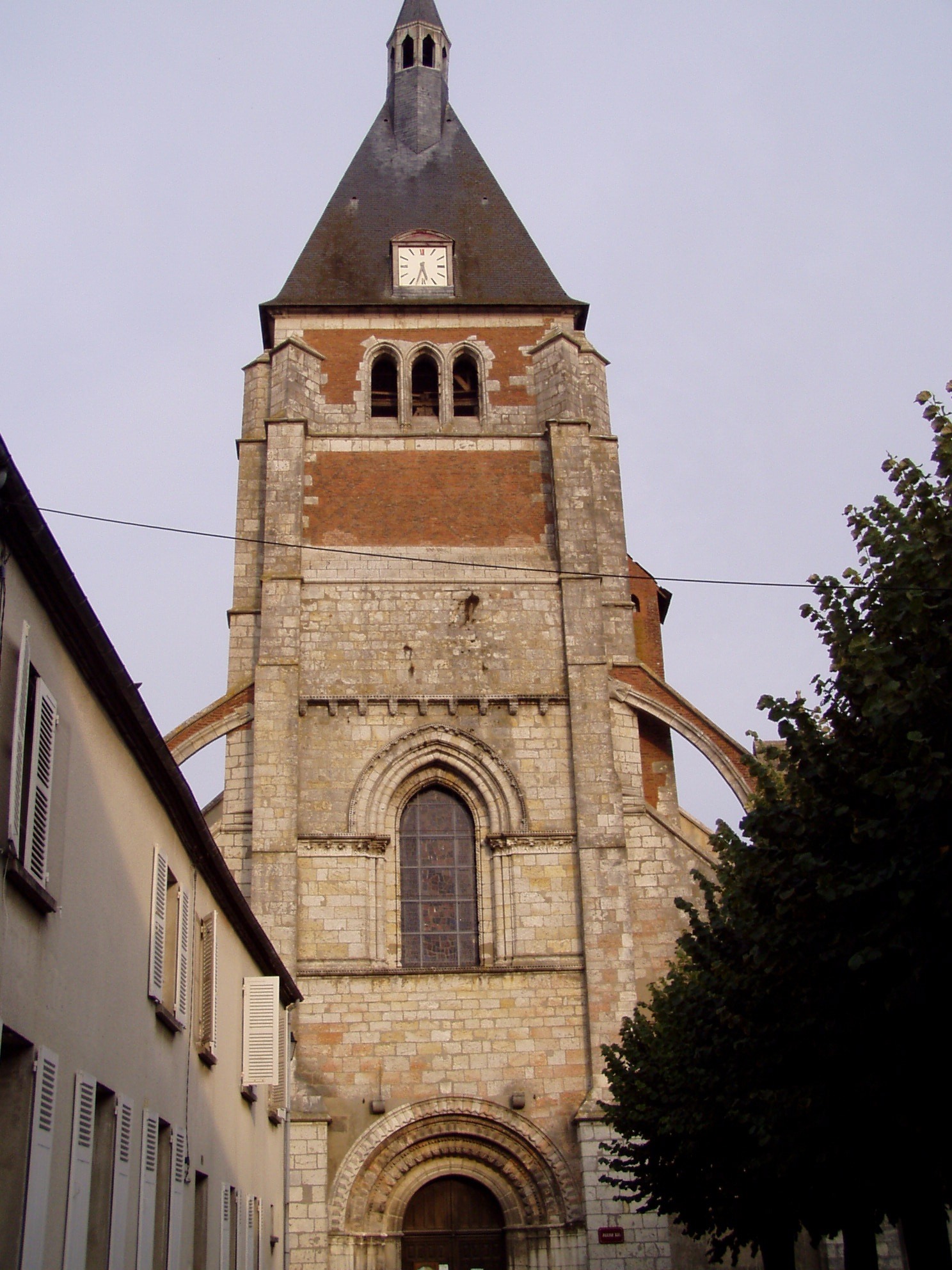
- Bell tower

- Coat of arms
- Location of Lorris
- Location within France Location within Centre-Val de Loire
- Coordinates: 47°53′20″N 2°30′47″E
- Country: France
- Region: Centre-Val de Loire
- Department: Loiret
- Arrondissement: Montargis
- Canton: Lorris
- Intercommunality: Canaux et Forêts en Gâtinais

Government
  - Mayor (2020–2026): Valérie Martin
- Area^{1}: 44.91 km^{2} (17.34 sq mi)
- Highest elevation: 173 m (568 ft)
- Lowest elevation: 114 m (374 ft)
- Population (2023): 2,996
  - Density: 66.71/km^{2} (172.8/sq mi)
- Time zone: UTC+01:00 (CET)
  - Summer (DST): UTC+02:00 (CEST)
- INSEE/Postal code: 45187 /45260
- Website: Official website
- ^{1} French Land Register data, which excludes lakes, ponds, glaciers > 1 km^{2} (0.386 sq mi or 247 acres) and river estuaries.

Lorris (French pronunciation: [lɔʁis]) is a commune in the Loiret department in north-central France.

== Geography ==
Lorris is located 7 km (4.3 mi) northeast of Sully-sur-Loire, 20 km (12 mi) southwest of Montargis, 46 km (29 mi) east of Orléans and 110 km (68 mi) south of Paris. It is in the southernmost part of the historical region Gâtinais. It is east of the Foret d'Orléans and gave its name to the Massif de Lorris, the easternmost part of the Orléans forest.

== Population ==
Historical population
Year	Pop.	±% p.a.
1968	2,170	—
1975	2,265	+0.61%
1982	2,556	+1.74%
1990	2,620	+0.31%
1999	2,674	+0.23%
2007	2,890	+0.98%
2012	3,034	+0.98%
2017	2,943	−0.61%
2023	2,996	+0.30%
Source: INSEE

== History ==
On 30 October 1242, the Peace of Lorris was signed by Raymond VII, Count of Toulouse and Louis IX, King of France. The two men renewed the Treaty of Paris which they had already concluded on 12 April 1229. The treaty put an end to the sufferings of the Albigeois.

== Mayors of Lorris ==
- Louis Henri Prochasson
- Louis Lucien Naudin
- Constant Renard
- Constant Leturcq

== See also ==
- Communes of the Loiret department
