= National forest (France) =

Forest owned by the French state

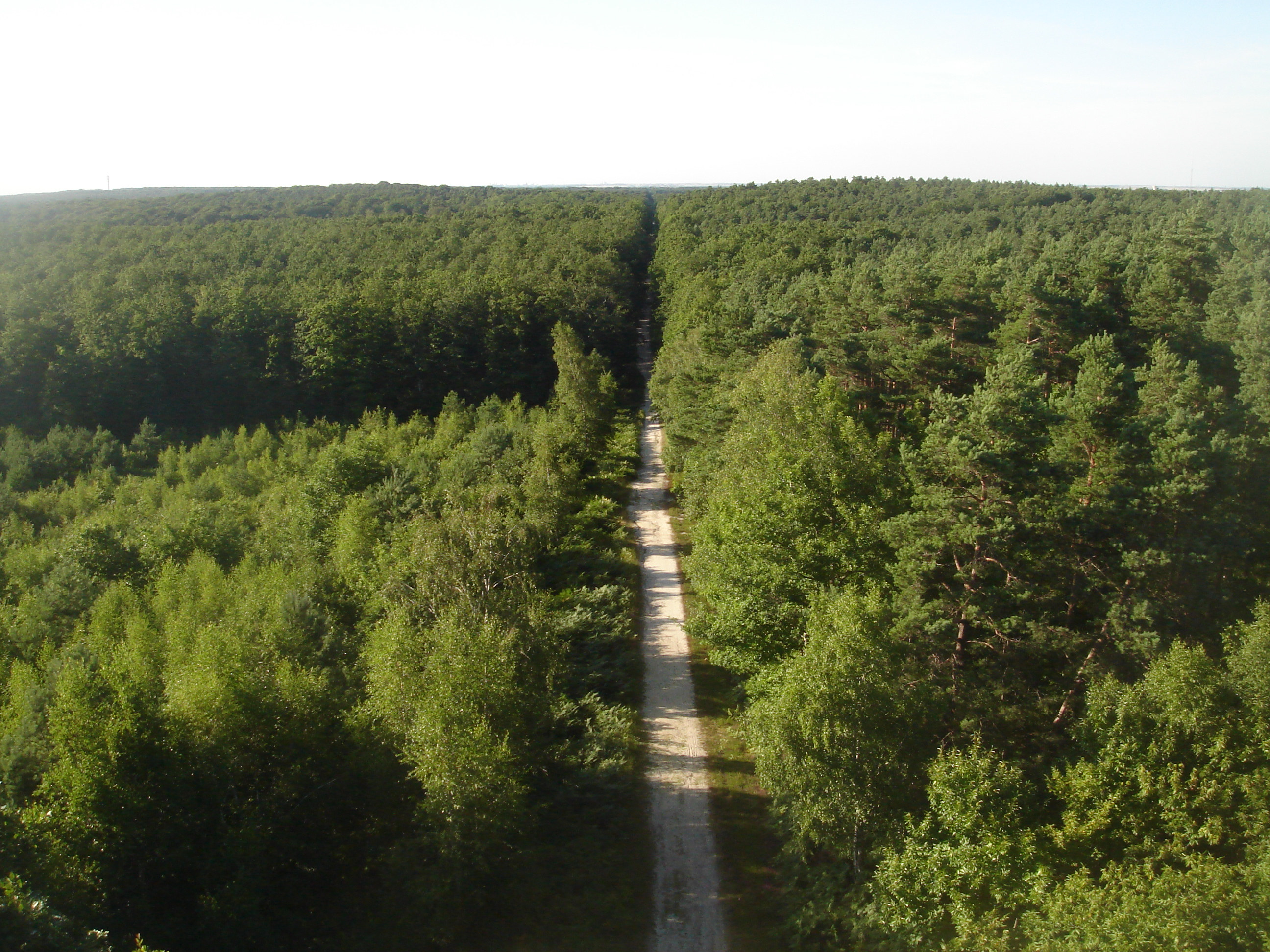
The Orleans Forest is the largest national forest in France.

A national forest (French: forêt domaniale) is a forest owned by the French state. This status originates with the Edict of Moulins of 1566. French national forests are managed by the National Board of Forestry (NFB) under the national forestry law, the successor of ordinances and regulations that have taken place since the time of Charlemagne "at the discretion of political, economic and demographic context of France, making the first state-owned natural forest areas whose management is rigorously controlled".

== Legal status ==
National forests have existed in some form since ancient times: in fact state ownership is a legal system distinct from inheritance and private property that dates back to the Edict of Moulins (1566).

Thus, a number of royal forests are the "property" of the state, which has delegated the management of the Ministry of Agriculture who has himself told NFB and sometimes about national parks.

This "heritage of the nation" is legally different from ordinary property: the state holds or the usus, which amounts to the public or the fructus that does not exist (translated)

or the abusus, the public domain is inalienable.

=== Disposition of National Forests ===
==== Before 2006 ====
Prior to 2006, Article L. 62 in French national code stated:

The State-owned forestry and wood can not be alienated by virtue of a law. However, it may be conducted in the ordinary form, the sale of State-owned timber holding less than 150 hectares that could not bear the costs of care and are not necessary to ensure the rivers, streams and rivers are separated and at a distance of at least one kilometer from other woods and forests of great extent. (Translated)

This article therefore specified that forests can be sold by decree or order in France) ("ordinary form"), of woods of less than 150 hectare, at least 1 kilometre (0.62 mi) from other large forests.

==== The 2006 reform ====
In 2006, an ordonnance which codifies the legislative part of the general code of the property of public persons; former Article L. 62 was renumbered Article L. 3211-5 of the CGPPP. But the renumbering was accompanied by a significant change.

The new Article L. 3211-5 provides:

The woods and forests of the State can not be alienated by virtue of a law. Notwithstanding the first paragraph, the State may, in the conditions specified by order in Council of State proceed with the sale of woods and forests that meet the following conditions: 1st: Be a capacity of fewer than 150 hectares; 2nd: Not to be necessary and to the maintenance and protection of mountain land, or to stabilize the water system and the protection of water quality, or to the ecological balance of a region or the well being of the population; 3rd: And whose revenues do not cover their management operating expenses. Notwithstanding the first paragraph, woods and forests of the state included in the scope of declaration of public utility are assigned in accordance with the last paragraph of Article L. 12-4 of code of expropriation for public utility under the conditions specified by Order in Council of State. (Translated)

== Management of National Forests ==
Under the Forest Code, the National Forests Office (NFB) manages state forests. Management is made under a contract of objectives and performance between the state and the NFB, which organizes details of national forest policy. Following the Grenelle Environment a dual general purpose is to Produce more wood, while better preserving the biodiversity. This sentence does not apply to the management of national forests, but to objective of sable harvesting.

Each forest has a forest management (plan) written for a period of 15–25 years and approved by the Minister of Agriculture. This arrangement establishes guidelines and management plans cuts during the period.

Revenues from state-owned forests are used for operation of the NFB, which manages both profitable forests and unprofitable forests (especially in the mountains or in Provence). The potential benefit of the NFB could return to the state.

== Origin and area ==
In France there are approximately 1,300 National Forests for a combined forest area of about 1,800,000 hectare.

690,000 hectare were originally royal forests; 340,000 hectare are former abbey forests confiscated by the State during the Revolution; 65,000 hectare are forested dunes under the order of February 5, 1817; 390,000 hectare consists of eroding land acquired under the land restoration mountain; 200,000 hectare acquired from private forests since 1914.

=== Origin of Royal Forests ===
- Royal properties since time immemorial. They are mainly located in the Paris region and in the Pays de la Loire. About {390,000 hectare.
- Contributed to the Crown by Henry IV of France in 1589. Hautes-Pyrénées, Haute-Garonne and Ariege. About 80,000 hectare.
- Ancient sovereign areas that became royal domain (Flanders, Artois, Lorraine, Alsace, Franche-Comte, Corsica). About 210,000 hectare.
- Acquisitions to improve the supply of wooden marine arsenals Lorient and Brest in the 18th century . About 10,000 hectare.

== Large National Forests ==
- Forêt domaniale d'Orléans (Loiret). 34,700 ha, the largest national forest in France.
- Forêt domaniale de Chaux (Jura). 20,493 ha.
- Forêt domaniale de Fontainebleau (Seine-et-marne). 20,272 ha.
- Forêt domaniale de Compiègne (Oise). 14,357 ha.
- Forêt domaniale indivise de Haguenau (Bas-Rhin). 13,462 ha, joint ownership between the state and the municipality of Haguenau.
- Forêt domaniale de Retz (Aisne). 13,240 ha.
- Forêt domaniale de la Harth (Haut-Rhin). 13,140 ha.
- Forêt domaniale de l'Aigoual (Gard). 11,460 ha.
- Forêt domaniale de Tronçais (Allier). 10,532 ha.
- Forêt domaniale de Mormal (Nord). 9,140 ha.
- Forêt domaniale de la Grande-Chartreuse (Isère). 8,466 ha.
- Forêt domaniale de Darney (Vosges). 8,010 ha.
- Forêts domaniales de Saint-Gobain et de Coucy-Basse (Aisne). 8,480 ha.
- Forêts domaniales de Chœurs et de Bommiers (Cher et Indre). 6,460 ha.
- Forêt domaniale de l'Estérel (PACA). 6,000 ha.
- Forêt domaniale de Château-Regnault. 5,500 ha.
- Forêt domaniale de Bercé (Sarthe). 5,400 ha.
- Forêt domaniale d'Andaines (Orne). 5,396 ha.
- Forêt domaniale de Chinon (Indre-et-Loire). 5,140 ha.
- Forêt domaniale de Perseigne (Sarthe). 5,110 ha.
- Forêt domaniale de Trois-Fontaines (Marne). 5,070 ha.
- Forêt domaniale de Cîteaux (Côte-d'Or). 3,610 ha.
- Forêt domaniale de Loches (Indre-et-Loire). 3,590 ha.
- Forêt domaniale de Grésigne (Tarn). 3,460 ha.
- Forêt domaniale de Rennes. 2,950 ha.
- Forêt domaniale d'Aïtone (Corse). 1,675 ha.
- Forêt domaniale de Montmorency.

== See also ==
- List of types of formally designated forests
- French forestry Ordinance of 1669
- Public domain in French public law
