= Chanteau =

- Commune
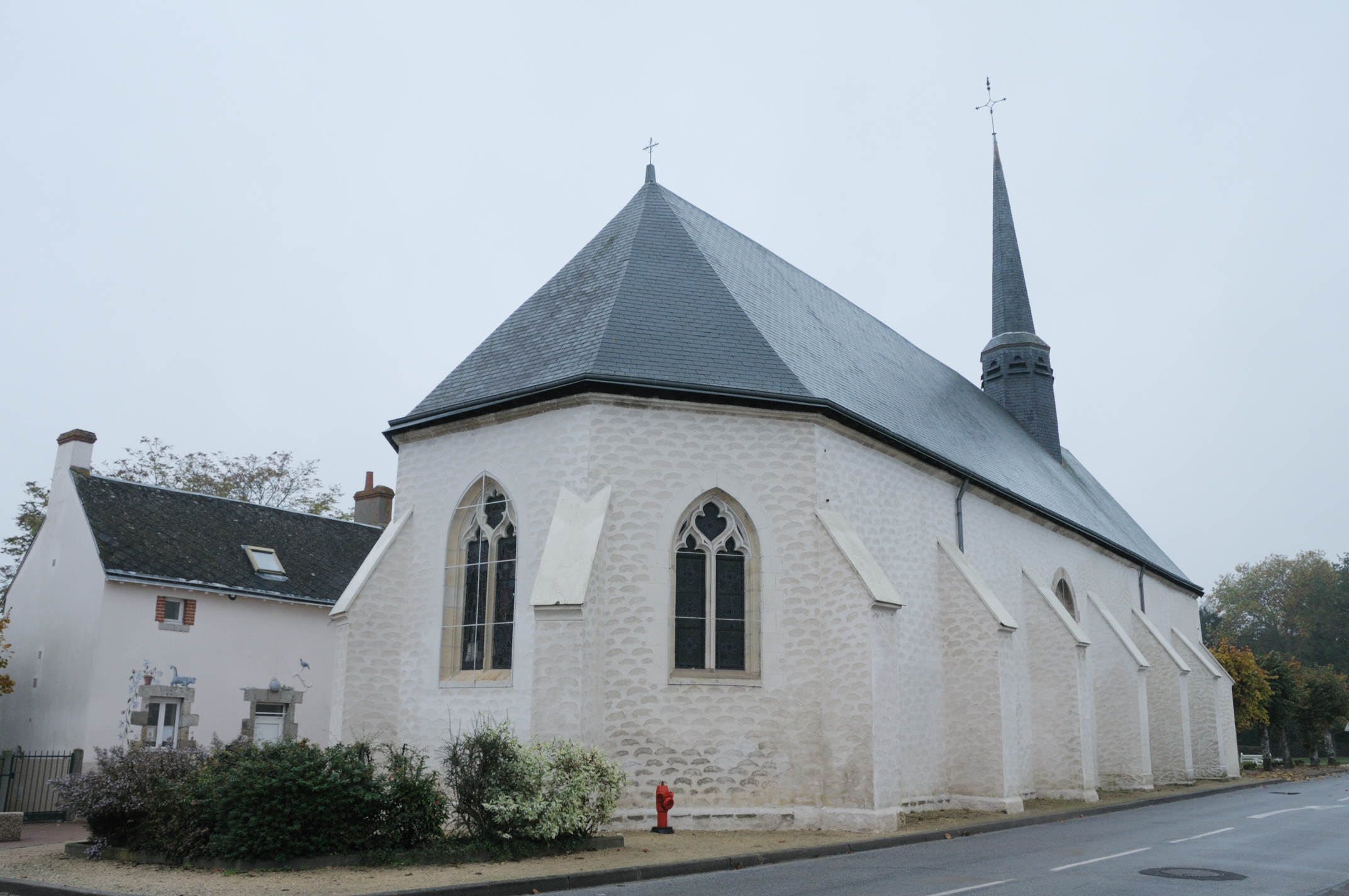
- The church in Chanteau

- Coat of arms
- Location of Chanteau
- Location within France Location within Centre-Val de Loire
- Coordinates: 47°57′56″N 1°58′09″E
- Country: France
- Region: Centre-Val de Loire
- Department: Loiret
- Arrondissement: Orléans
- Canton: Fleury-les-Aubrais
- Intercommunality: Orléans Métropole

Government
  - Mayor (2020–2026): Christel Botello
- Area^{1}: 28.85 km^{2} (11.14 sq mi)
- Highest elevation: 138 m (453 ft)
- Lowest elevation: 109 m (358 ft)
- Population (2023): 1,590
  - Density: 55.1/km^{2} (143/sq mi)
- Demonym: Chanteausiens
- Time zone: UTC+01:00 (CET)
  - Summer (DST): UTC+02:00 (CEST)
- INSEE/Postal code: 45072 /45400
- ^{1} French Land Register data, which excludes lakes, ponds, glaciers > 1 km^{2} (0.386 sq mi or 247 acres) and river estuaries.

Chanteau (French pronunciation: [ʃɑ̃to]) is a commune in the Loiret department in north-central France. It is part of the functional urban area of Orléans.

== See also ==
- Communes of the Loiret department
