= Rebréchien =

- Commune
- Coat of arms
- Location of Rebréchien
- Location within France Location within Centre-Val de Loire
- Coordinates: 47°59′18″N 2°02′44″E
- Country: France
- Region: Centre-Val de Loire
- Department: Loiret
- Arrondissement: Orléans
- Canton: Fleury-les-Aubrais
- Intercommunality: CC de la Forêt

Government
  - Mayor (2020–2026): Thierry Leguet
- Area^{1}: 19.19 km^{2} (7.41 sq mi)
- Highest elevation: 141 m (463 ft)
- Population (2023): 1,441
  - Density: 75.09/km^{2} (194.5/sq mi)
- Time zone: UTC+01:00 (CET)
  - Summer (DST): UTC+02:00 (CEST)
- INSEE/Postal code: 45261 /45470
- ^{1} French Land Register data, which excludes lakes, ponds, glaciers > 1 km^{2} (0.386 sq mi or 247 acres) and river estuaries.

Rebréchien (French pronunciation: [ʁəbʁeʃjɛ̃]) is a commune in the Loiret department in north-central France.

== See also ==
- Communes of the Loiret department
