= Vennecy =

- Commune
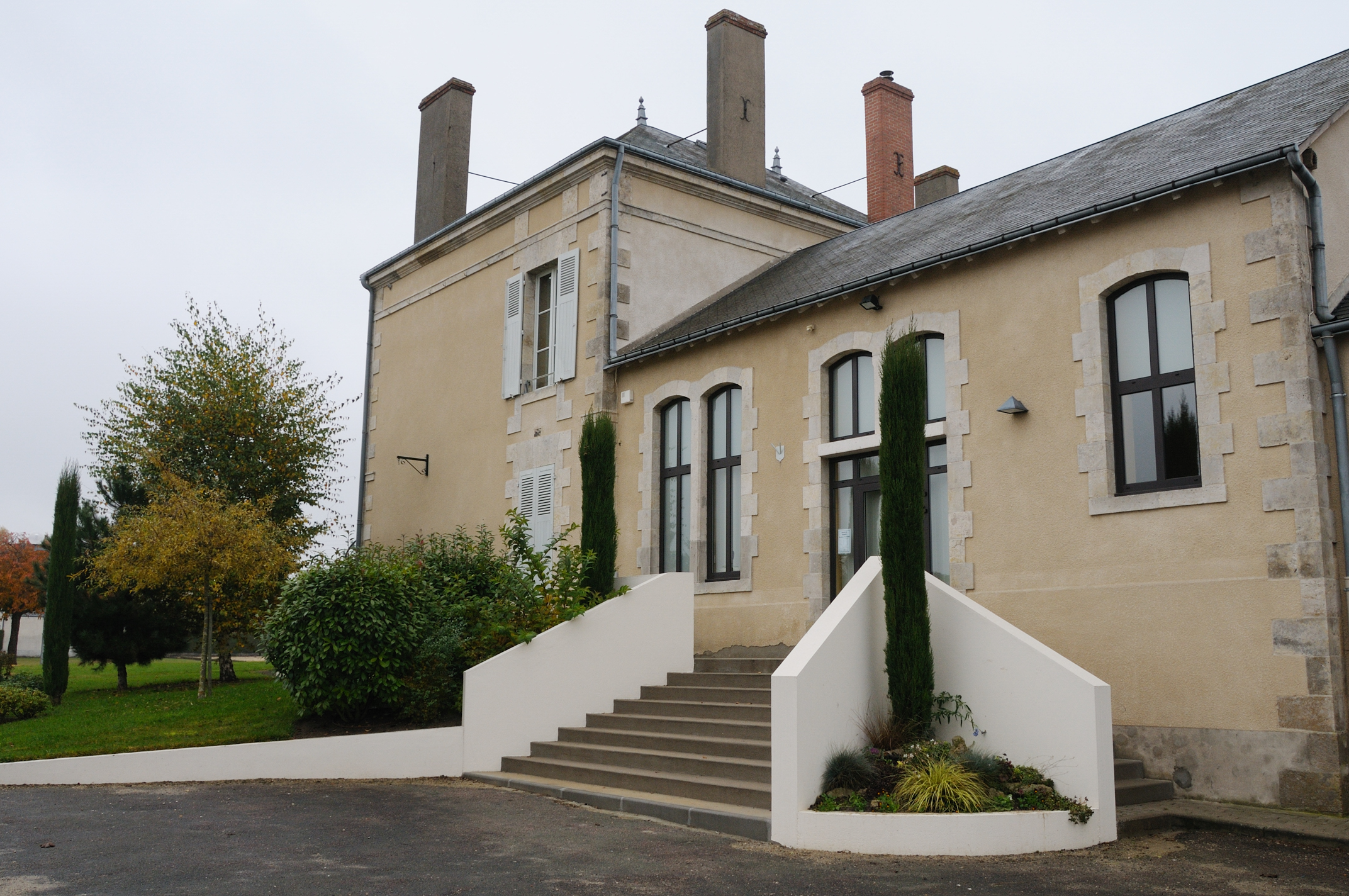
- The town hall in Vennecy

- Coat of arms
- Location of Vennecy
- Location within France Location within Centre-Val de Loire
- Coordinates: 47°57′N 2°03′E
- Country: France
- Region: Centre-Val de Loire
- Department: Loiret
- Arrondissement: Orléans
- Canton: Fleury-les-Aubrais
- Intercommunality: CC de la Forêt

Government
  - Mayor (2020–2026): Roger Deslandes
- Area^{1}: 11 km^{2} (4.2 sq mi)
- Highest elevation: 135 m (443 ft)
- Lowest elevation: 106 m (348 ft)
- Population (2023): 2,047
  - Density: 190/km^{2} (480/sq mi)
- Time zone: UTC+01:00 (CET)
  - Summer (DST): UTC+02:00 (CEST)
- INSEE/Postal code: 45333 /45760
- ^{1} French Land Register data, which excludes lakes, ponds, glaciers > 1 km^{2} (0.386 sq mi or 247 acres) and river estuaries.

Vennecy (French pronunciation: [vɛnsi]) is a commune in the Loiret department in north-central France.

== Population ==
Historical population
Year	Pop.	±% p.a.
1968	543	—
1975	731	+4.34%
1982	932	+3.53%
1990	987	+0.72%
1999	1,299	+3.10%
2007	1,371	+0.68%
2012	1,494	+1.73%
2017	1,812	+3.93%
2023	2,047	+2.05%
Source: INSEE

== See also ==
- Communes of the Loiret department
