= Traînou =

- Commune
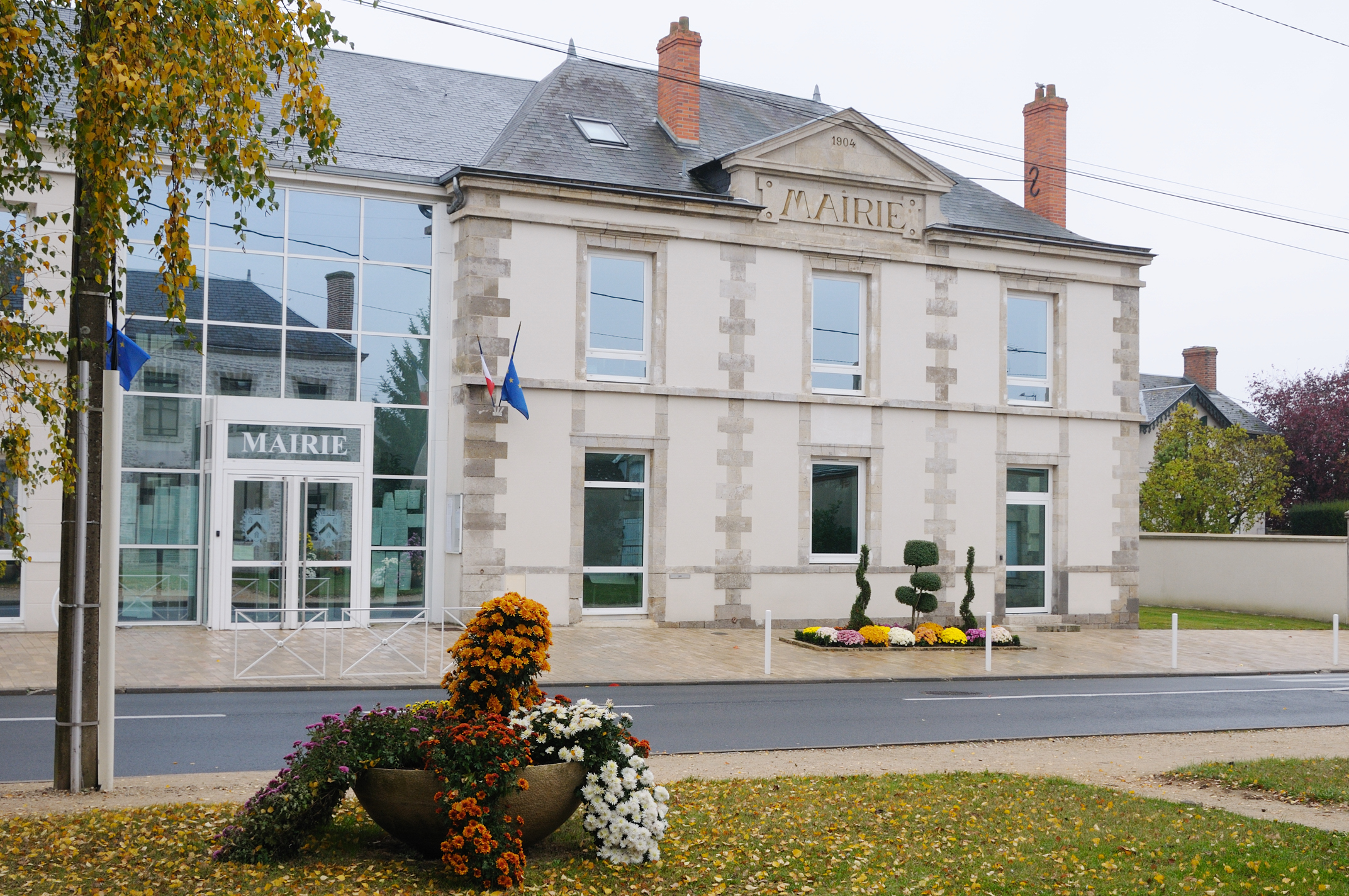
- The town hall in Traînou

- Coat of arms
- Location of Traînou
- Location within France Location within Centre-Val de Loire
- Coordinates: 47°58′26″N 2°06′20″E
- Country: France
- Region: Centre-Val de Loire
- Department: Loiret
- Arrondissement: Orléans
- Canton: Fleury-les-Aubrais

Government
  - Mayor (2020–2026): Aymeric Pépion
- Area^{1}: 33.68 km^{2} (13.00 sq mi)
- Highest elevation: 144 m (472 ft)
- Lowest elevation: 107 m (351 ft)
- Population (2023): 3,402
  - Density: 101.0/km^{2} (261.6/sq mi)
- Demonym: Trianiens
- Time zone: UTC+01:00 (CET)
  - Summer (DST): UTC+02:00 (CEST)
- INSEE/Postal code: 45327 /45470
- Website: www.mairie-trainou.fr
- ^{1} French Land Register data, which excludes lakes, ponds, glaciers > 1 km^{2} (0.386 sq mi or 247 acres) and river estuaries.

Traînou (French pronunciation: [tʁɛnu]) is a commune in the Loiret department in north-central France.

== Population ==
Historical population
Year	Pop.	±% p.a.
1968	861	—
1975	1,330	+6.41%
1982	1,952	+5.63%
1990	2,618	+3.74%
1999	2,796	+0.73%
2007	3,042	+1.06%
2012	3,195	+0.99%
2017	3,343	+0.91%
2023	3,402	+0.29%
Source: INSEE

== See also ==
- Communes of the Loiret department
