= Loury, Loiret =

Loury
- Commune
- Coat of arms
- Location of Loury
- Location within France Location within Centre-Val de Loire
- Coordinates: 48°00′07″N 2°05′09″E
- Country: France
- Region: Centre-Val de Loire
- Department: Loiret
- Arrondissement: Orléans
- Canton: Fleury-les-Aubrais
- Intercommunality: CC de la Forêt

Government
  - Mayor (2020–2026): Christophe Le Goff
- Area^{1}: 34.36 km^{2} (13.27 sq mi)
- Highest elevation: 152 m (499 ft)
- Lowest elevation: 108 m (354 ft)
- Population (2023): 2,616
  - Density: 76.14/km^{2} (197.2/sq mi)
- Demonym: Louriots
- Time zone: UTC+01:00 (CET)
  - Summer (DST): UTC+02:00 (CEST)
- INSEE/Postal code: 45188 /45470
- Website: www.ville-loury.fr
- ^{1} French Land Register data, which excludes lakes, ponds, glaciers > 1 km^{2} (0.386 sq mi or 247 acres) and river estuaries.

Loury (French pronunciation: [luʁi]) is a commune in the Loiret department in north-central France.

== Population ==
Historical population
Year	Pop.	±% p.a.
1968	1,039	—
1975	1,082	+0.58%
1982	1,413	+3.89%
1990	1,810	+3.14%
1999	1,990	+1.06%
2007	2,487	+2.83%
2012	2,556	+0.55%
2017	2,452	−0.83%
2023	2,616	+1.08%
Source: INSEE

== See also ==
- Communes of the Loiret department
