= Marigny-les-Usages =

- Commune
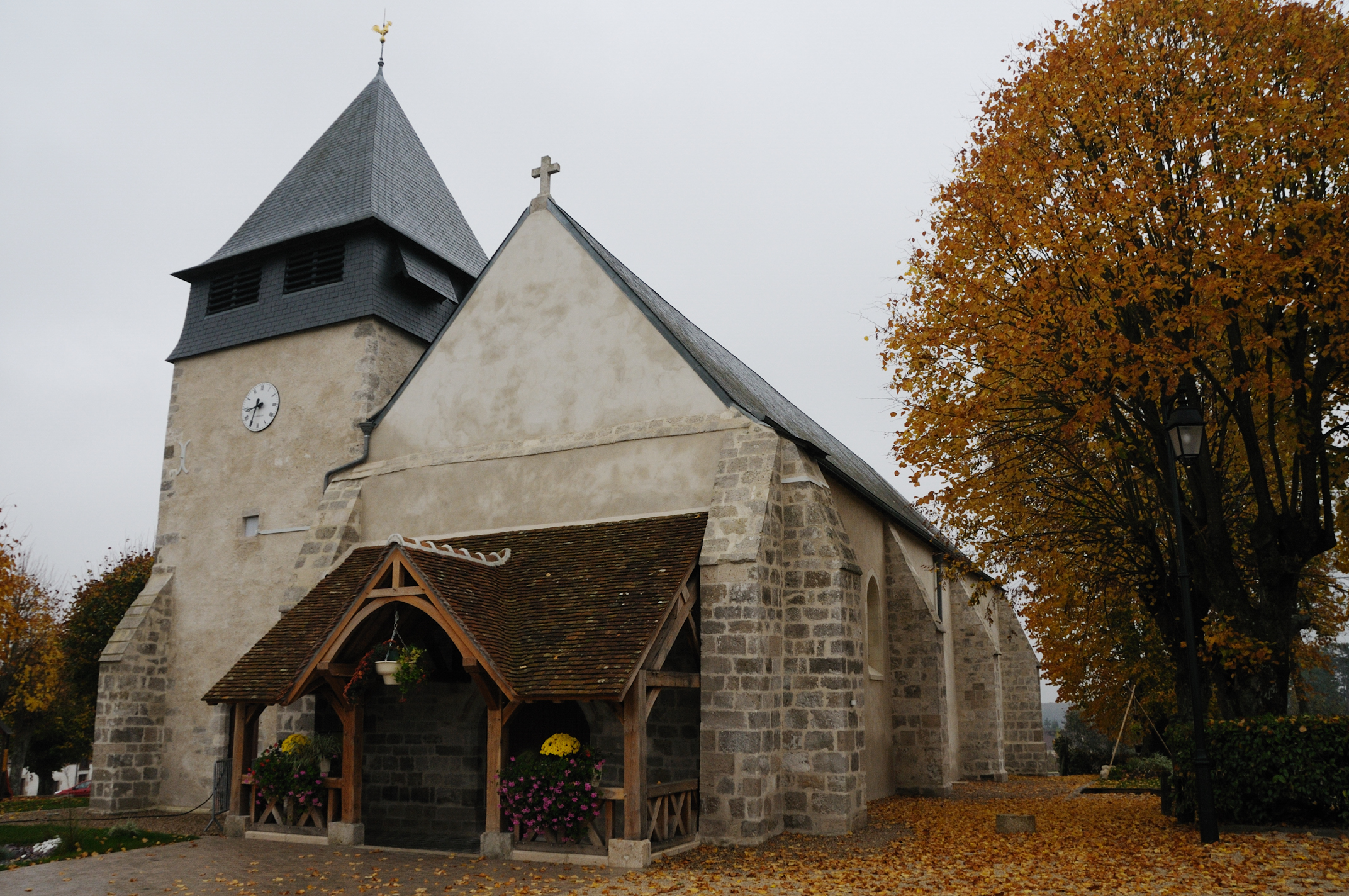
- The church in Marigny-les-Usages

- Coat of arms
- Location of Marigny-les-Usages
- Location within France Location within Centre-Val de Loire
- Coordinates: 47°57′28″N 2°01′02″E
- Country: France
- Region: Centre-Val de Loire
- Department: Loiret
- Arrondissement: Orléans
- Canton: Fleury-les-Aubrais
- Intercommunality: Orléans Métropole

Government
  - Mayor (2020–2026): Philippe Beaumont
- Area^{1}: 9.66 km^{2} (3.73 sq mi)
- Highest elevation: 138 m (453 ft)
- Lowest elevation: 103 m (338 ft)
- Population (2023): 1,887
  - Density: 195/km^{2} (506/sq mi)
- Time zone: UTC+01:00 (CET)
  - Summer (DST): UTC+02:00 (CEST)
- INSEE/Postal code: 45197 /45760
- ^{1} French Land Register data, which excludes lakes, ponds, glaciers > 1 km^{2} (0.386 sq mi or 247 acres) and river estuaries.

Marigny-les-Usages (French pronunciation: [maʁiɲi le.z‿yzaʒ]) is a commune in the Loiret department in north-central France.

== See also ==
- Communes of the Loiret department
