= Nesploy =

- Commune
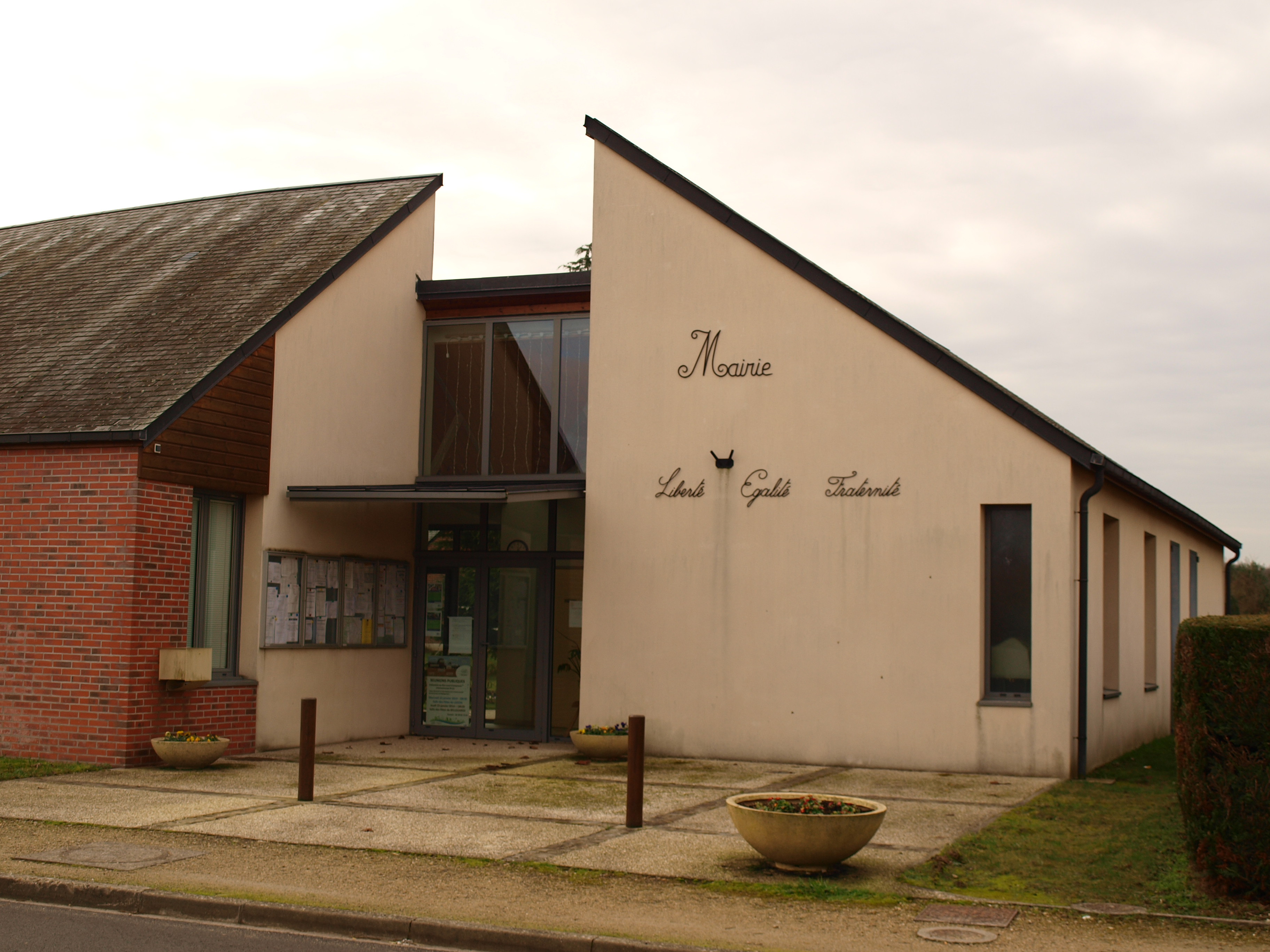
- The town hall in Nesploy

- Coat of arms
- Location of Nesploy
- Location within France Location within Centre-Val de Loire
- Coordinates: 47°59′50″N 2°21′45″E
- Country: France
- Region: Centre-Val de Loire
- Department: Loiret
- Arrondissement: Montargis
- Canton: Lorris
- Intercommunality: Canaux et Forêts en Gâtinais

Government
  - Mayor (2020–2026): Marie-Christine Fontaine
- Area^{1}: 12.87 km^{2} (4.97 sq mi)
- Highest elevation: 144 m (472 ft)
- Lowest elevation: 112 m (367 ft)
- Population (2023): 367
  - Density: 28.5/km^{2} (73.9/sq mi)
- Demonym: Nesployois
- Time zone: UTC+01:00 (CET)
  - Summer (DST): UTC+02:00 (CEST)
- INSEE/Postal code: 45223 /45270
- Website: http://www.nesploy.fr/
- ^{1} French Land Register data, which excludes lakes, ponds, glaciers > 1 km^{2} (0.386 sq mi or 247 acres) and river estuaries.

Nesploy (French pronunciation: [nɛplwa]) is a commune in the Loiret department in north-central France.

== Geography ==
The river Bézonde goes through the commune limits. The commune itself is located in the Orléanais agricultural region. Nearby municipalities are Combreux, Montbarrois, Saint-Loup-des-Vignes, and Fréville-du-Gâtinais.

== History ==
The area of this town has historically been located in the royal forest of the Duke of Orléans. Only one of four castles remain from the past.

== Demographics ==
Historical population

Year	Pop.	±% p.a.
1793	315	—
1800	348	+1.43%
1806	334	−0.68%
1821	365	+0.59%
1831	411	+1.19%
1836	424	+0.62%
1841	437	+0.61%
1846	443	+0.27%
1851	475	+1.40%
1856	482	+0.29%
1861	463	−0.80%
1866	506	+1.79%
1872	481	−0.84%
1876	470	−0.58%
1881	454	−0.69%
1886	486	+1.37%
1891	453	−1.40%
1896	403	−2.31%
1901	401	−0.10%

Year	Pop.	±% p.a.
1906	360	−2.13%
1911	366	+0.33%
1921	304	−1.84%
1926	306	+0.13%
1931	295	−0.73%
1936	288	−0.48%
1946	271	−0.61%
1954	259	−0.56%
1962	246	−0.64%
1968	233	−0.90%
1975	223	−0.62%
1982	218	−0.32%
1990	195	−1.38%
1999	298	+4.82%
2007	362	+2.46%
2012	402	+2.12%
2017	368	−1.75%
2023	367	−0.05%

Source: EHESS and INSEE (1968-2023)

== See also ==
- Communes of the Loiret department
