= Oussoy-en-Gâtinais =

- Commune
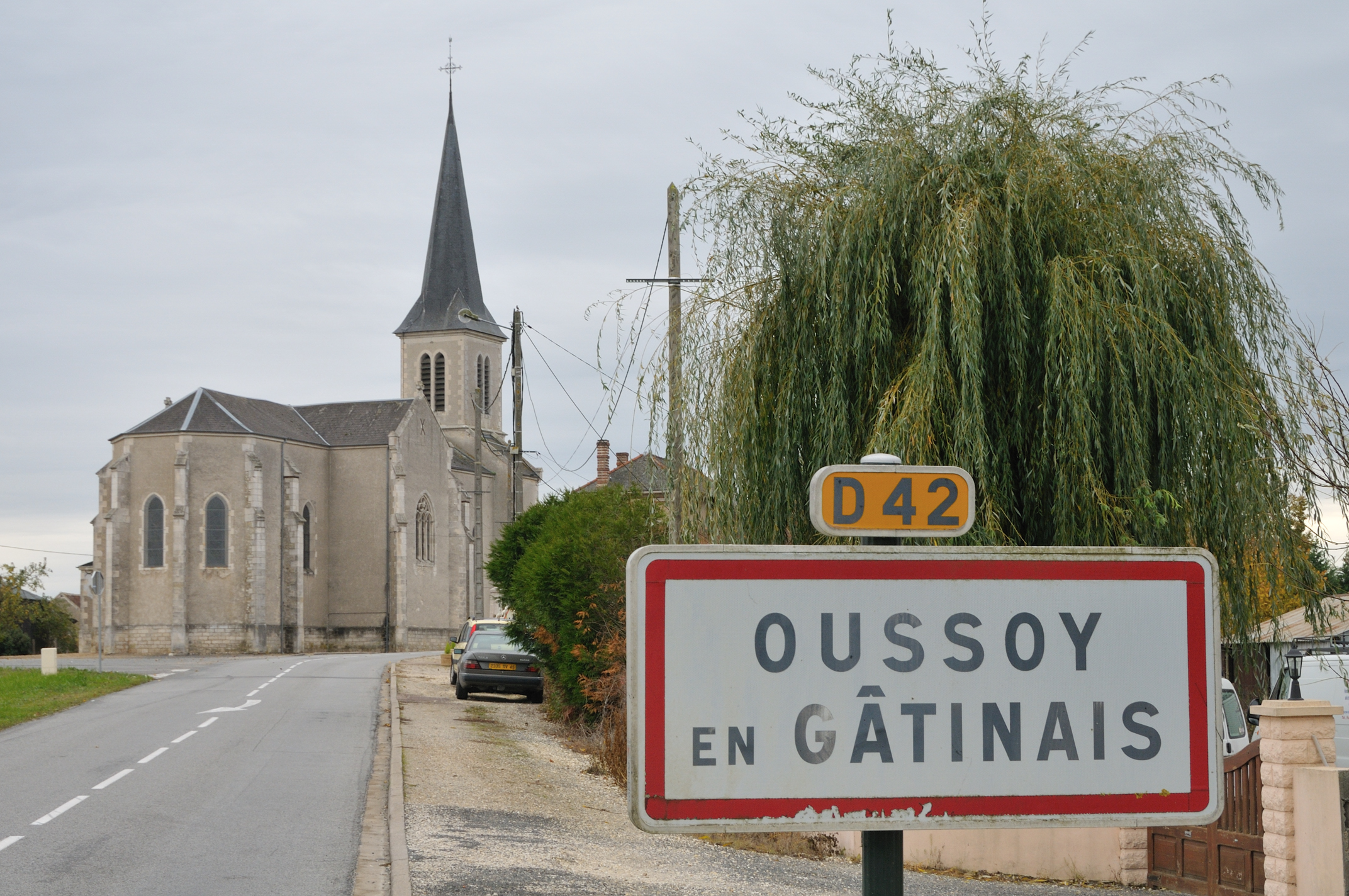
- The church and the road into Oussoy-en-Gâtinais

- Coat of arms
- Location of Oussoy-en-Gâtinais
- Location within France Location within Centre-Val de Loire
- Coordinates: 47°54′25″N 2°38′31″E
- Country: France
- Region: Centre-Val de Loire
- Department: Loiret
- Arrondissement: Montargis
- Canton: Lorris
- Intercommunality: Canaux et Forêts en Gâtinais

Government
  - Mayor (2021–2026): François Martin
- Area^{1}: 23.23 km^{2} (8.97 sq mi)
- Population (2023): 425
  - Density: 18.3/km^{2} (47.4/sq mi)
- Time zone: UTC+01:00 (CET)
  - Summer (DST): UTC+02:00 (CEST)
- INSEE/Postal code: 45239 /45290
- ^{1} French Land Register data, which excludes lakes, ponds, glaciers > 1 km^{2} (0.386 sq mi or 247 acres) and river estuaries.

Oussoy-en-Gâtinais (French pronunciation: [uswa ɑ̃ ɡatinɛ], literally Oussoy in Gâtinais) is a commune in the Loiret department in north-central France.

== Geography ==
The river Solin flows northeastward through the western part of the commune.

== See also ==
- Communes of the Loiret department
