= Montereau =

Montereau may refer to:

- Montereau, Loiret, municipality in the Loiret department, France
- Montereau-Fault-Yonne, municipality in the Seine-et-Marne department, France
  - Battle of Montereau, 1814
  - Gare de Montereau, the railway station of Montereau-Fault-Yonne
- Montereau-sur-le-Jard, municipality in the Seine-et-Marne department, France
