= Sainte-Geneviève-des-Bois =

Sainte-Geneviève-des-Bois is the name of two communes in France:

- Sainte-Geneviève-des-Bois, Essonne
  - Sainte-Geneviève-des-Bois Cemetery, often referred to as "Sainte-Geneviève-des-Bois"
- Sainte-Geneviève-des-Bois, Loiret
