= Montbouy =

- Commune
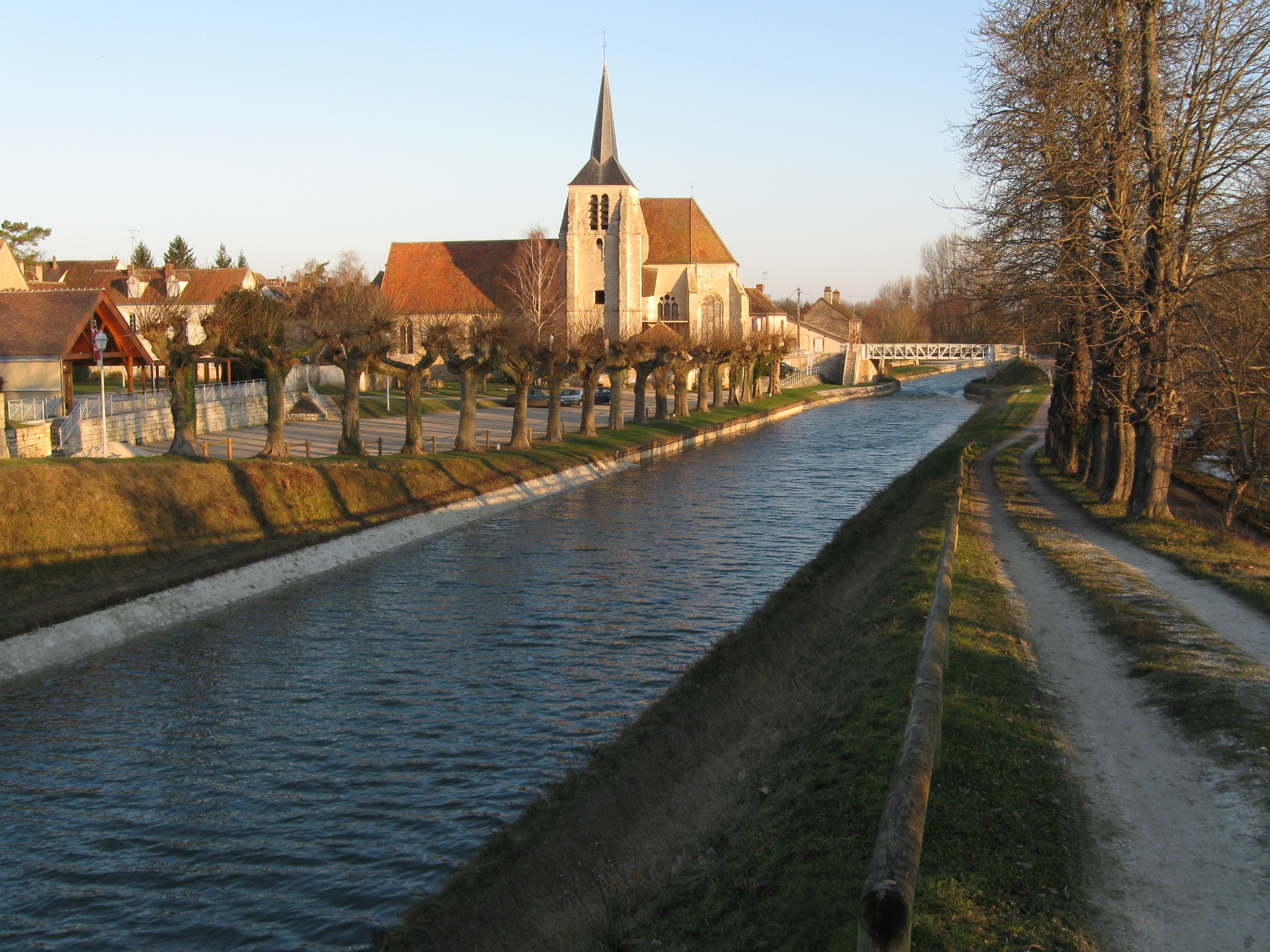
- The canal du Loing near Montbouy church
- Location of Montbouy
- Location within France Location within Centre-Val de Loire
- Coordinates: 47°51′43″N 2°49′12″E
- Country: France
- Region: Centre-Val de Loire
- Department: Loiret
- Arrondissement: Montargis
- Canton: Lorris
- Intercommunality: Canaux et Forêts en Gâtinais

Government
  - Mayor (2020–2026): Yves Boscardin
- Area^{1}: 26.73 km^{2} (10.32 sq mi)
- Highest elevation: 154 m (505 ft)
- Lowest elevation: 102 m (335 ft)
- Population (2023): 725
  - Density: 27.1/km^{2} (70.2/sq mi)
- Time zone: UTC+01:00 (CET)
  - Summer (DST): UTC+02:00 (CEST)
- INSEE/Postal code: 45210 /45230
- Website: montbouy.fr
- ^{1} French Land Register data, which excludes lakes, ponds, glaciers > 1 km^{2} (0.386 sq mi or 247 acres) and river estuaries.

Montbouy (French pronunciation: [mɔ̃bwi]) is a commune in the Loiret department in north-central France.

== Geography ==
The Aveyron river flows into the Loing in the commune.

== History ==
Neolithic artefacts have been found on each side of the Loing river, downstream from Montbouy near Craon.

Many Celtic remains suggest that Montbouy was one of the Boii main towns until 1,500 years B.C.. At that time they came under pressure from the Belgae in the north and the Vascones in the south; consequently they left their territory in the Gâtinais around Montargis between the Loing river and the Rimarde river (Note: This area includes such town names as Boësses, Boynes or Bouilly.) and, accompanied with some Lingones and Senones they went south to found Bolonia in North Italy. After they left their territory was occupied by the Senones and the Carnutes.

== See also ==
- Communes of the Loiret department
