= William of Donjeon =

French Roman Catholic saint

Saint Guillaume de Donjeon O.Cist.
- Archbishop of Bourges
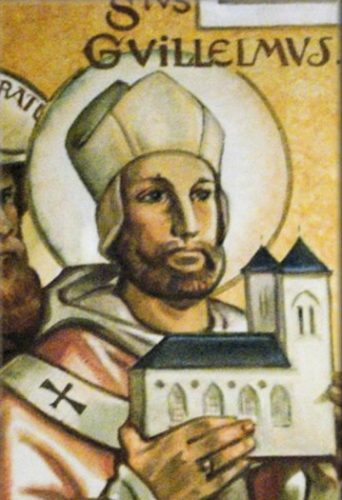
- Saint William of Bourges. Engraving by Fritz Dinger after Andreas Johann Jacob Müller
- Church: Roman Catholic Church
- Archdiocese: Bourges
- See: Bourges
- Appointed: 23 November 1200
- Installed: 1201
- Term ended: 10 January 1209
- Predecessor: Henri de Sully
- Successor: Girad de Cros

Orders
- Consecration: c. 1201

Personal details
- Born: Guillaume de Donjeon c. 1140 Nevers, Kingdom of France
- Died: 10 January 1209 (aged 59) Bourges, Kingdom of France
- Buried: Bourges Cathedral

Sainthood
- Feast day: 10 January
- Venerated in: Roman Catholic Church
- Canonized: 17 May 1218 by Pope Honorius III
- Attributes: Episcopal attire; Cistercian habit
- Patronage: University of Paris; Gunsmiths

Guillaume de Donjeon (c. 1140 – 10 January 1209) was a French Roman Catholic prelate who served as the Archbishop of Bourges from 1200 until his death. He served as a canon in Soissons and Paris before he entered the Order of Grandmont. Sometime later, he entered the Cistercians. He was known to practice austerities such as abstaining from meat and wearing a hair shirt.

He was also known for his deep devotion to the Blessed Sacrament and for converting sinners. He oversaw the construction of the new archdiocesan cathedral that his predecessor had authorized and in which he himself would be buried. It had been claimed that he performed eighteen miracles in life and eighteen more in death.

His canonization was celebrated under Pope Honorius III in 1218, and he was named the patron saint of the Parisian college.

== Life ==
Guillaume de Donjeon was born about 1140 at the castle of Arthel near Nevers, into the ancient family of the Counts of Nevers. He was one of eight children born to Baudoin de Corbeil and Eustachia de Châtillon. His father planned for him to become a soldier, but Guillaume chose the ecclesiastical path. His siblings were: Baudoin, Regnault (d. 1208), Ferry (d. 1174), Baudoin (d. 1226), Pierre (d. 1222), Guy, and Eustachia.

The Soissons archdeacon Pierre – his maternal uncle – oversaw his education. He became a canon in Soissons and later in Paris. It was sometime later that he resolved to abandon the world and enter into the Order of Grandmont. He was content with this decision and lived amongst them for a period of time while practicing great austerities but in 1167 once he saw the dissensions occurring amongst members of the order, decided to enter the Cistercians. He assumed the habit at Pontigny Abbey in northern France, where he was soon chosen prior. In 1184 he became the abbot of Fontaine-Jean Abbey near Sens and later of Chaalis Abbey near Senlis from 1187 until 1200.

He fostered a deep and special devotion to the Blessed Sacrament and loved to spend much of his time at the foot of the altar contemplating it. In 1200, the Bourges priests gathered and elected him to be the new Archbishop of Bourges. The news quite overwhelmed him with grief, but a stern command from his order's general could move him to accept that honor. Even Pope Innocent III prompted him to accept the appointment. He continued his austerities throughout his episcopal career, to the point of abstaining from meat and wearing a hair shirt.

The bishop proved instrumental in the ongoing construction of the Gothic Cathedral of Saint Stephen, which his predecessor had begun earlier in 1195. The lower half of the cathedral was completed, and around December 1208, the choir was almost finished. At that time, he was able to celebrate the Christmas Mass. The poor and sick were never forgotten, for the bishop visited them on frequent occasions, while he also ministered to the imprisoned. He also defended clerical rights against state intervention. He once incurred wrath from King Philip II when the bishop enacted an interdict from Innocent III against him for having divorced his wife.

He began preparations for a mission among the Albigensians when he died just after midnight, kneeling at the altar in contemplation and meditation in 1209. In his last will and testament, he requested to be buried with his hair shirt and on ashes. Some claimed he performed eighteen miracles in his life and a further eighteen after his death.

== Sainthood ==
His canonization was celebrated by Pope Honorius III on 17 May 1218; the late bishop is considered the patron saint of the University of Paris.
