= Auvilliers-en-Gâtinais =

- Commune
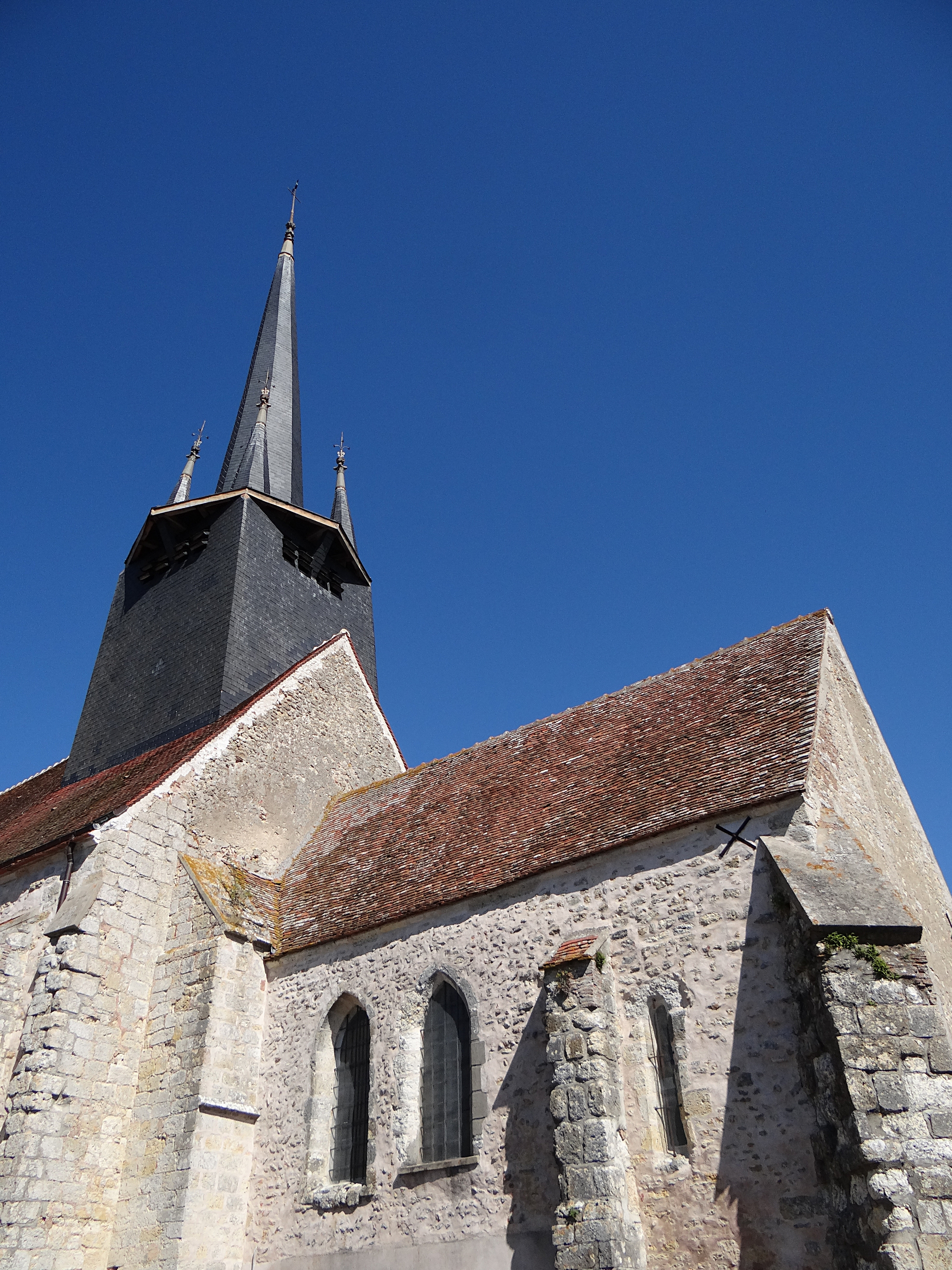
- The church in Auvilliers-en-Gâtinais

- Coat of arms
- Location of Auvilliers-en-Gâtinais
- Location within France Location within Centre-Val de Loire
- Coordinates: 47°57′55″N 2°30′01″E
- Country: France
- Region: Centre-Val de Loire
- Department: Loiret
- Arrondissement: Montargis
- Canton: Lorris
- Intercommunality: CC Canaux Forêts Gâtinais

Government
  - Mayor (2020–2026): Jean-Marc Pointeau
- Area^{1}: 20.61 km^{2} (7.96 sq mi)
- Highest elevation: 126 m (413 ft)
- Lowest elevation: 96 m (315 ft)
- Population (2023): 342
  - Density: 16.6/km^{2} (43.0/sq mi)
- Time zone: UTC+01:00 (CET)
  - Summer (DST): UTC+02:00 (CEST)
- INSEE/Postal code: 45017 /45270
- ^{1} French Land Register data, which excludes lakes, ponds, glaciers > 1 km^{2} (0.386 sq mi or 247 acres) and river estuaries.

Auvilliers-en-Gâtinais (French pronunciation: [ovilje ɑ̃ ɡɑtinɛ]; literally "Auvilliers in Gâtinais") is a commune in the Loiret department in north-central France.

== Population ==
Historical population
Year	Pop.	±% p.a.
1968	286	—
1975	271	−0.77%
1982	273	+0.11%
1990	280	+0.32%
1999	306	+0.99%
2007	335	+1.14%
2012	357	+1.28%
2017	360	+0.17%
2023	342	−0.85%
Source: INSEE

== See also ==
- Communes of the Loiret department
