= Chailly-en-Gâtinais =

- Commune
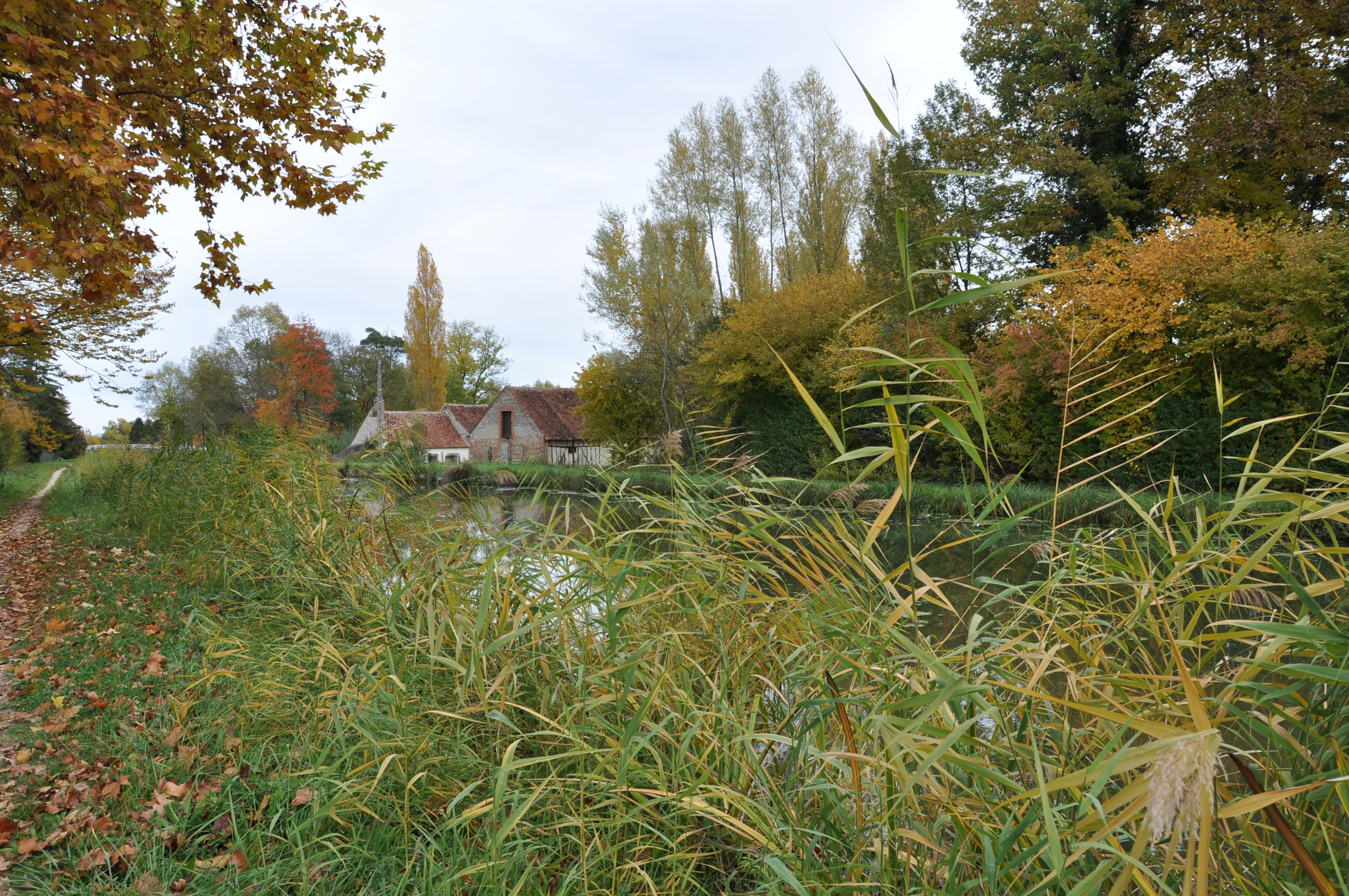
- The Orleans Canal at Chailly-en-Gâtinais

- Coat of arms
- Location of Chailly-en-Gâtinais
- Location within France Location within Centre-Val de Loire
- Coordinates: 47°56′55″N 2°32′37″E
- Country: France
- Region: Centre-Val de Loire
- Department: Loiret
- Arrondissement: Montargis
- Canton: Lorris
- Intercommunality: Canaux et Forêts en Gâtinais

Government
  - Mayor (2020–2026): Hervé Vasseur
- Area^{1}: 18.37 km^{2} (7.09 sq mi)
- Highest elevation: 121 m (397 ft)
- Lowest elevation: 95 m (312 ft)
- Population (2023): 694
  - Density: 37.8/km^{2} (97.8/sq mi)
- Time zone: UTC+01:00 (CET)
  - Summer (DST): UTC+02:00 (CEST)
- INSEE/Postal code: 45066 /45260
- ^{1} French Land Register data, which excludes lakes, ponds, glaciers > 1 km^{2} (0.386 sq mi or 247 acres) and river estuaries.

Chailly-en-Gâtinais (French pronunciation: [ʃaji ɑ̃ ɡɑtinɛ]; literally 'Chailly in Gâtinais') is a commune in the Loiret department in north-central France.

== See also ==
- Communes of the Loiret department
