= Fréville-du-Gâtinais =

- Commune
- Coat of arms
- Location of Fréville-du-Gâtinais
- Location within France Location within Centre-Val de Loire
- Coordinates: 48°01′28″N 2°26′43″E
- Country: France
- Region: Centre-Val de Loire
- Department: Loiret
- Arrondissement: Montargis
- Canton: Lorris
- Intercommunality: Canaux et Forêts en Gâtinais

Government
  - Mayor (2020–2026): André Poisson
- Area^{1}: 9.77 km^{2} (3.77 sq mi)
- Highest elevation: 131 m (430 ft)
- Lowest elevation: 97 m (318 ft)
- Population (2023): 175
  - Density: 17.9/km^{2} (46.4/sq mi)
- Demonym: Frévillois
- Time zone: UTC+01:00 (CET)
  - Summer (DST): UTC+02:00 (CEST)
- INSEE/Postal code: 45150 /45270
- ^{1} French Land Register data, which excludes lakes, ponds, glaciers > 1 km^{2} (0.386 sq mi or 247 acres) and river estuaries.

Fréville-du-Gâtinais (French pronunciation: [fʁevil dy ɡatinɛ], literally Fréville of the Gâtinais) is a commune in the Loiret department in north-central France.

== See also ==
- Communes of the Loiret department
