= Villemoutiers =

- Commune
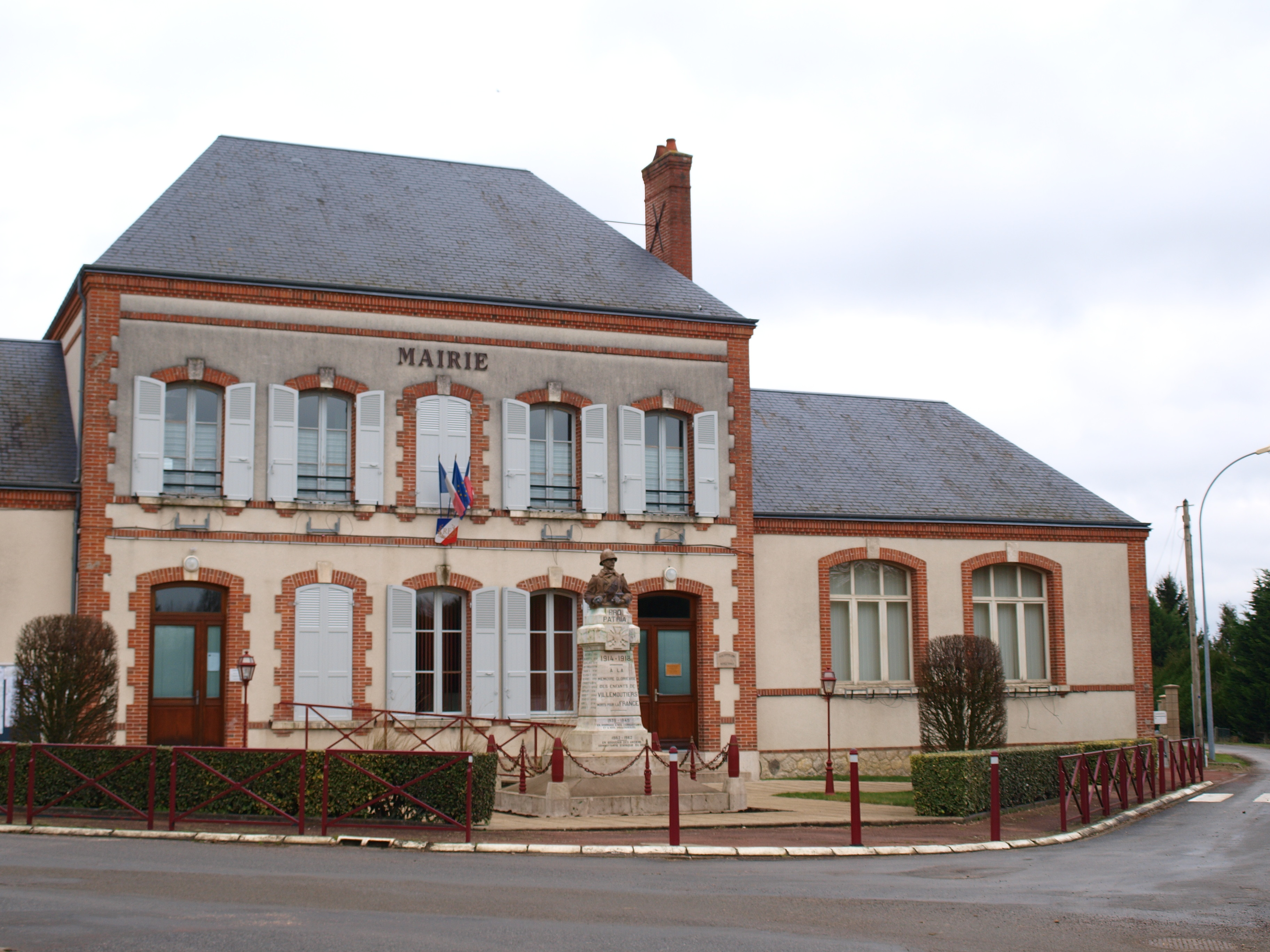
- The town hall in Villemoutiers
- Location of Villemoutiers
- Location within France Location within Centre-Val de Loire
- Coordinates: 47°59′42″N 2°33′30″E
- Country: France
- Region: Centre-Val de Loire
- Department: Loiret
- Arrondissement: Montargis
- Canton: Lorris
- Intercommunality: Canaux et Forêts en Gâtinais

Government
  - Mayor (2020–2026): Christiane Burgevin
- Area^{1}: 16.18 km^{2} (6.25 sq mi)
- Highest elevation: 106 m (348 ft)
- Lowest elevation: 91 m (299 ft)
- Population (2023): 471
  - Density: 29.1/km^{2} (75.4/sq mi)
- Demonym: Villamonastériens
- Time zone: UTC+01:00 (CET)
  - Summer (DST): UTC+02:00 (CEST)
- INSEE/Postal code: 45339 /
- ^{1} French Land Register data, which excludes lakes, ponds, glaciers > 1 km^{2} (0.386 sq mi or 247 acres) and river estuaries.

Villemoutiers (French pronunciation: [vilmutje]) is a commune in the Loiret department in north-central France.

== See also ==
- Communes of the Loiret department
