= Quiers-sur-Bezonde =

- Commune
- Coat of arms
- Location of Quiers-sur-Bezonde
- Location within France Location within Centre-Val de Loire
- Coordinates: 47°59′57″N 2°26′16″E
- Country: France
- Region: Centre-Val de Loire
- Department: Loiret
- Arrondissement: Montargis
- Canton: Lorris
- Intercommunality: Canaux et Forêts en Gâtinais

Government
  - Mayor (2020–2026): Yohan Jobet
- Area^{1}: 16.61 km^{2} (6.41 sq mi)
- Highest elevation: 135 m (443 ft)
- Lowest elevation: 104 m (341 ft)
- Population (2023): 1,183
  - Density: 71.22/km^{2} (184.5/sq mi)
- Demonym: Quierois
- Time zone: UTC+01:00 (CET)
  - Summer (DST): UTC+02:00 (CEST)
- INSEE/Postal code: 45259 /45270
- ^{1} French Land Register data, which excludes lakes, ponds, glaciers > 1 km^{2} (0.386 sq mi or 247 acres) and river estuaries.

Quiers-sur-Bezonde (French pronunciation: [kjɛʁ syʁ bəzɔ̃d]; before 2023: Quiers-sur-Bézonde) is a commune in the Loiret department in north-central France.

== See also ==
- Communes of the Loiret department
