= Champcevrais =

- Commune
- Location of Champcevrais
- Location within France Location within Bourgogne-Franche-Comté
- Coordinates: 47°44′47″N 2°57′30″E
- Country: France
- Region: Bourgogne-Franche-Comté
- Department: Yonne
- Arrondissement: Auxerre
- Canton: Cœur de Puisaye

Government
  - Mayor (2021–2026): Jean-Pierre Sanchis
- Area^{1}: 32.73 km^{2} (12.64 sq mi)
- Highest elevation: 206 m (676 ft)
- Lowest elevation: 153 m (502 ft)
- Population (2023): 309
  - Density: 9.44/km^{2} (24.5/sq mi)
- Time zone: UTC+01:00 (CET)
  - Summer (DST): UTC+02:00 (CEST)
- INSEE/Postal code: 89072 /89220
- ^{1} French Land Register data, which excludes lakes, ponds, glaciers > 1 km^{2} (0.386 sq mi or 247 acres) and river estuaries.

Champcevrais (French pronunciation: [ʃɑ̃səvʁɛ]) is a commune in the Yonne department in Bourgogne-Franche-Comté in north-central France.

== Geography ==
The Aveyron river has its source in the commune.

== See also ==
- Communes of the Yonne department
