= Fontainebleau et du Gâtinais =

Fontainebleau et du Gâtinais is a biosphere reserve located in the Ile de France region, some 70 km south-east of Paris, first designated in 1998 and extended in 2010. The biosphere reserve is composed of temperate deciduous forest (mainly oak, Scots pine and beech), heathlands, open rock areas and several wetlands. In total, the reserve protects 150,544 hectares. The center of the biosphere, is located at 48°22′N 2°33′E.

The biosphere reserve contains two habitats of community interest listed in the European Union's Habitats, Flora and Fauna Directive: Northern Atlantic wet heaths with Erica tetralix, and forests of slopes, screes and ravines (Polystico-Corylenion). These are included in the 20 core areas of 3,874 hectares. The core and the buffer zones correspond to the administrative unit of the Forest of Fontainebleau, managed by the Office National des Forêts. The transition area lies essentially in the Parc naturel régional du Gâtinais français but also includes villages and towns with a total of 60,000 inhabitants, including the town of Fontainebleau (1998).

The biosphere reserve encompasses forest lies upon an ancient marine sand-bank which is occasionally overlaid by sandstone. The sandbank lies on a layer of Brie limestone and green marl, where springs arise. The soils within the forest area are highly diverse, which also is one explanation for the high plant diversity, as more than 5,800 plant species have been identified so far. The biosphere reserve contains two habitats of community interest listed in the European Union's Habitats, Flora and Fauna Directive: Northern Atlantic wet heaths with Erica tetralix, and forests of slopes, screes and ravines (Polystico-Corylenion).

== Socio-economic characteristics ==
Since the 10th century, the forest has been a royal domain and the Chateau de Fontainebleau was built at the beginning of the 16th century by Francois I.

The forest has been studied by well known naturalists (Linné, Jussieu and Buffon) since the 17th century and painters were also attracted to the forest (e.g. Millet, Rousseau, Corot), and created the Barbizon school in the 19th century.

Due to its proximity to the capital, the area receives exceptionally high number of visitors, which is a major management concern.

== Sources ==
This article incorporates text from a free content work. Licensed under CC BY-SA IGO 3.0 (license statement/permission). Text taken from UNESCO - MAB Biosphere Reserves Directory, UNESCO.
