= Pressigny-les-Pins =

- Commune
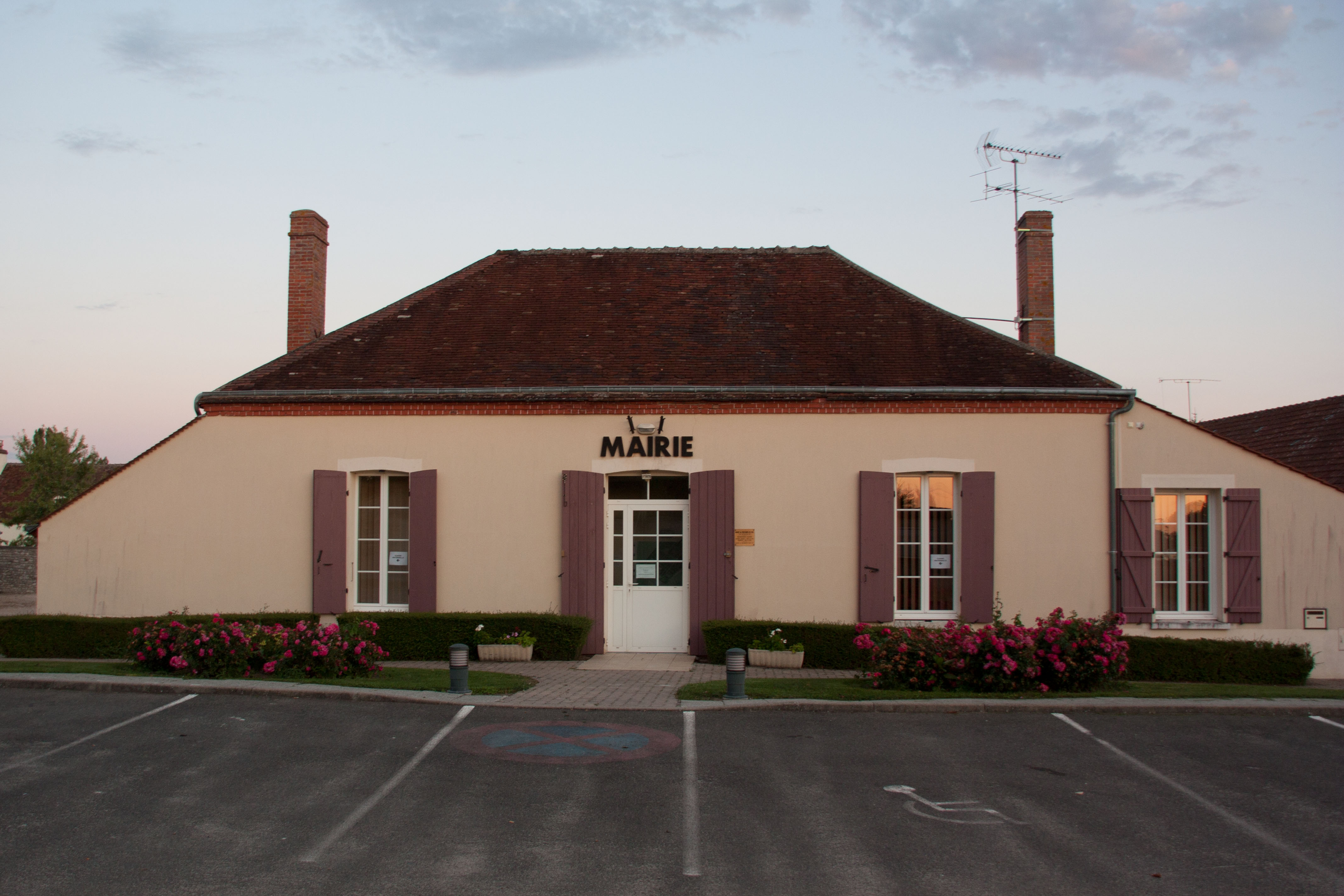
- The town hall in Pressigny-les-Pins
- Location of Pressigny-les-Pins
- Location within France Location within Centre-Val de Loire
- Coordinates: 47°52′55″N 2°45′06″E
- Country: France
- Region: Centre-Val de Loire
- Department: Loiret
- Arrondissement: Montargis
- Canton: Lorris
- Intercommunality: Canaux et Forêts en Gâtinais

Government
  - Mayor (2020–2026): Alain Deprun
- Area^{1}: 11.90 km^{2} (4.59 sq mi)
- Highest elevation: 125 m (410 ft)
- Lowest elevation: 106 m (348 ft)
- Population (2023): 527
  - Density: 44.3/km^{2} (115/sq mi)
- Demonym(s): Pressigniens, Pressigniennes
- Time zone: UTC+01:00 (CET)
  - Summer (DST): UTC+02:00 (CEST)
- INSEE/Postal code: 45257 /45290
- ^{1} French Land Register data, which excludes lakes, ponds, glaciers > 1 km^{2} (0.386 sq mi or 247 acres) and river estuaries.

Pressigny-les-Pins (French pronunciation: [pʁɛsiɲi le pɛ̃]) is a commune in the Loiret department in north-central France.

== See also ==
- Communes of the Loiret department
