= Chapelon =

- Commune
- Coat of arms
- Location of Chapelon
- Location within France Location within Centre-Val de Loire
- Coordinates: 48°02′16″N 2°34′45″E
- Country: France
- Region: Centre-Val de Loire
- Department: Loiret
- Arrondissement: Montargis
- Canton: Lorris
- Intercommunality: Canaux et Forêts en Gâtinais

Government
  - Mayor (2020–2026): Dominique Daux
- Area^{1}: 6.52 km^{2} (2.52 sq mi)
- Highest elevation: 94 m (308 ft)
- Lowest elevation: 84 m (276 ft)
- Population (2023): 249
  - Density: 38.2/km^{2} (98.9/sq mi)
- Demonym: Chapelonais
- Time zone: UTC+01:00 (CET)
  - Summer (DST): UTC+02:00 (CEST)
- INSEE/Postal code: 45078 /45270
- ^{1} French Land Register data, which excludes lakes, ponds, glaciers > 1 km^{2} (0.386 sq mi or 247 acres) and river estuaries.

Chapelon (French pronunciation: [ʃaplɔ̃]) is a commune in the Loiret department in north-central France.

== See also ==
- Communes of the Loiret department
