= La Chapelle-sur-Aveyron =

- Commune
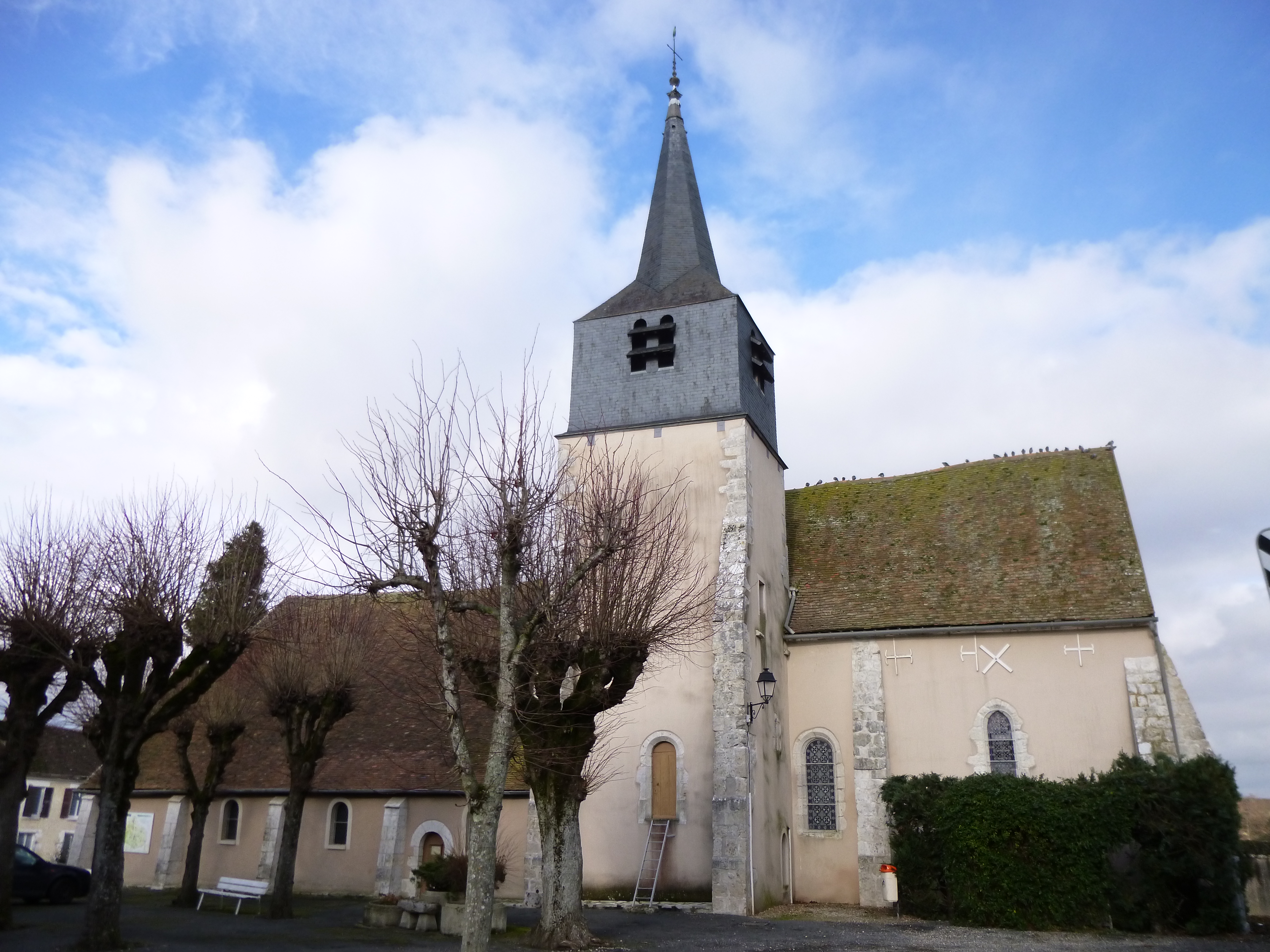
- The church in La Chapelle-sur-Aveyron

- Coat of arms
- Location of La Chapelle-sur-Aveyron
- Location within France Location within Centre-Val de Loire
- Coordinates: 47°51′59″N 2°51′45″E
- Country: France
- Region: Centre-Val de Loire
- Department: Loiret
- Arrondissement: Montargis
- Canton: Lorris
- Intercommunality: Canaux et Forêts en Gâtinais

Government
  - Mayor (2020–2026): Christian Chevallier
- Area^{1}: 19.03 km^{2} (7.35 sq mi)
- Highest elevation: 182 m (597 ft)
- Lowest elevation: 114 m (374 ft)
- Population (2023): 623
  - Density: 32.7/km^{2} (84.8/sq mi)
- Demonym: Chapellois
- Time zone: UTC+01:00 (CET)
  - Summer (DST): UTC+02:00 (CEST)
- INSEE/Postal code: 45077 /
- ^{1} French Land Register data, which excludes lakes, ponds, glaciers > 1 km^{2} (0.386 sq mi or 247 acres) and river estuaries.

La Chapelle-sur-Aveyron (French pronunciation: [la ʃapɛl syʁ aveʁɔ̃], literally La Chapelle on Aveyron) is a commune in the Loiret department in north-central France.

== Geography ==
The commune is traversed by the river Aveyron.

== See also ==
- Communes of the Loiret department
