= Aveyron (Loing) =

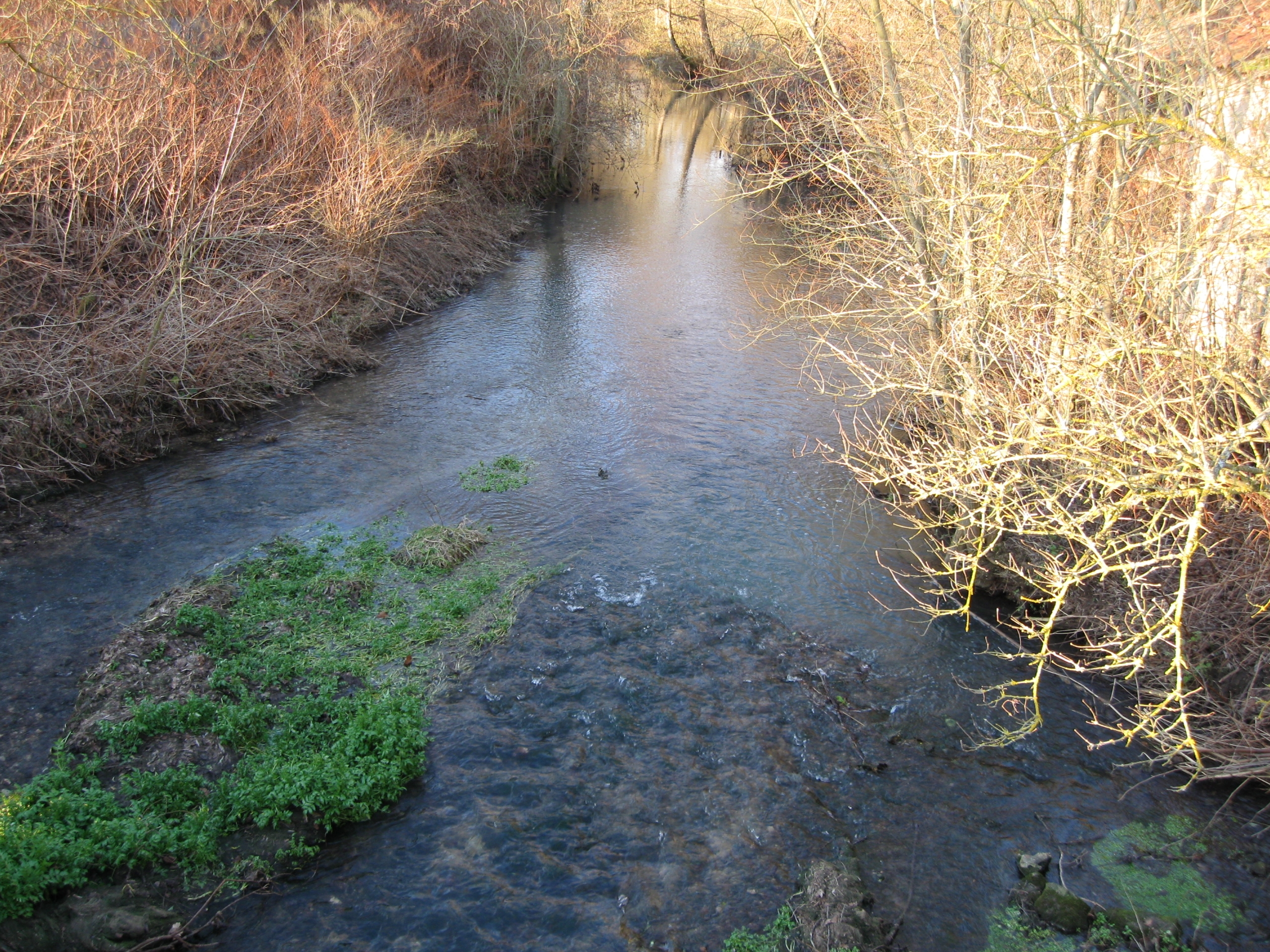
- The Aveyron at Montbouy.

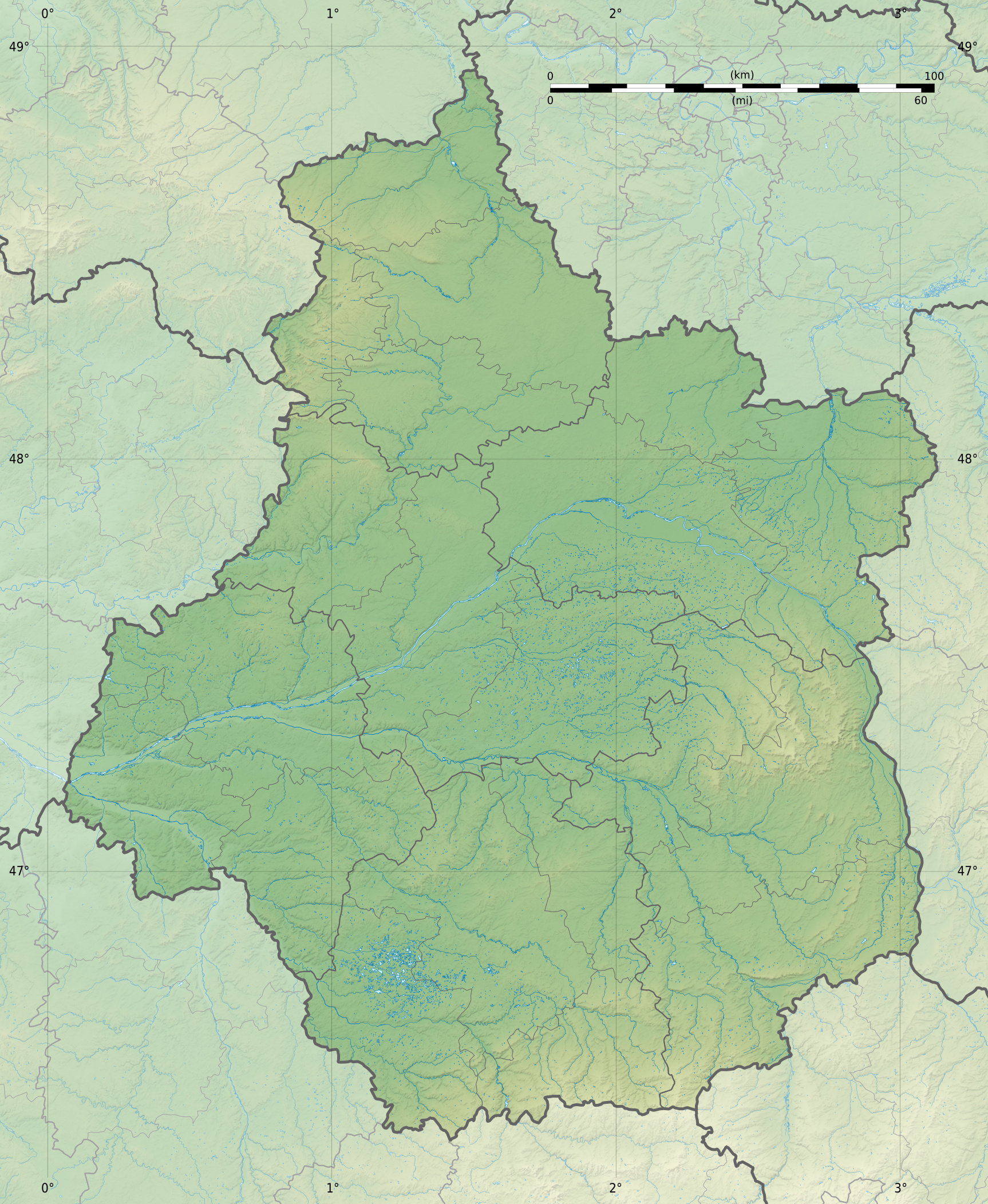
- Location within France Location within Centre-Val de Loire

Location
- Country: France

Physical characteristics
- Mouth
  - location: Loing
  - coordinates: 47°52′47″N 2°49′17″E
- Length: 30 km (19 mi)

Basin features
- Progression: Loing→ Seine→ English Channel

The Aveyron (French pronunciation: [aveʁɔ̃]) is a 30.1 km (18.7 mi) long river in France, a right tributary of the Loing.

The Aveyron flows into the Loing at Montbouy. Its discharge at La Chapelle-sur-Aveyron is 0.494 m^{3}/s.

It crosses the following departments and communes:

- Yonne: Champcevrais
- Loiret: Le Charme, Saint-Maurice-sur-Aveyron, La Chapelle-sur-Aveyron, Montbouy
