= Presnoy =

- Commune
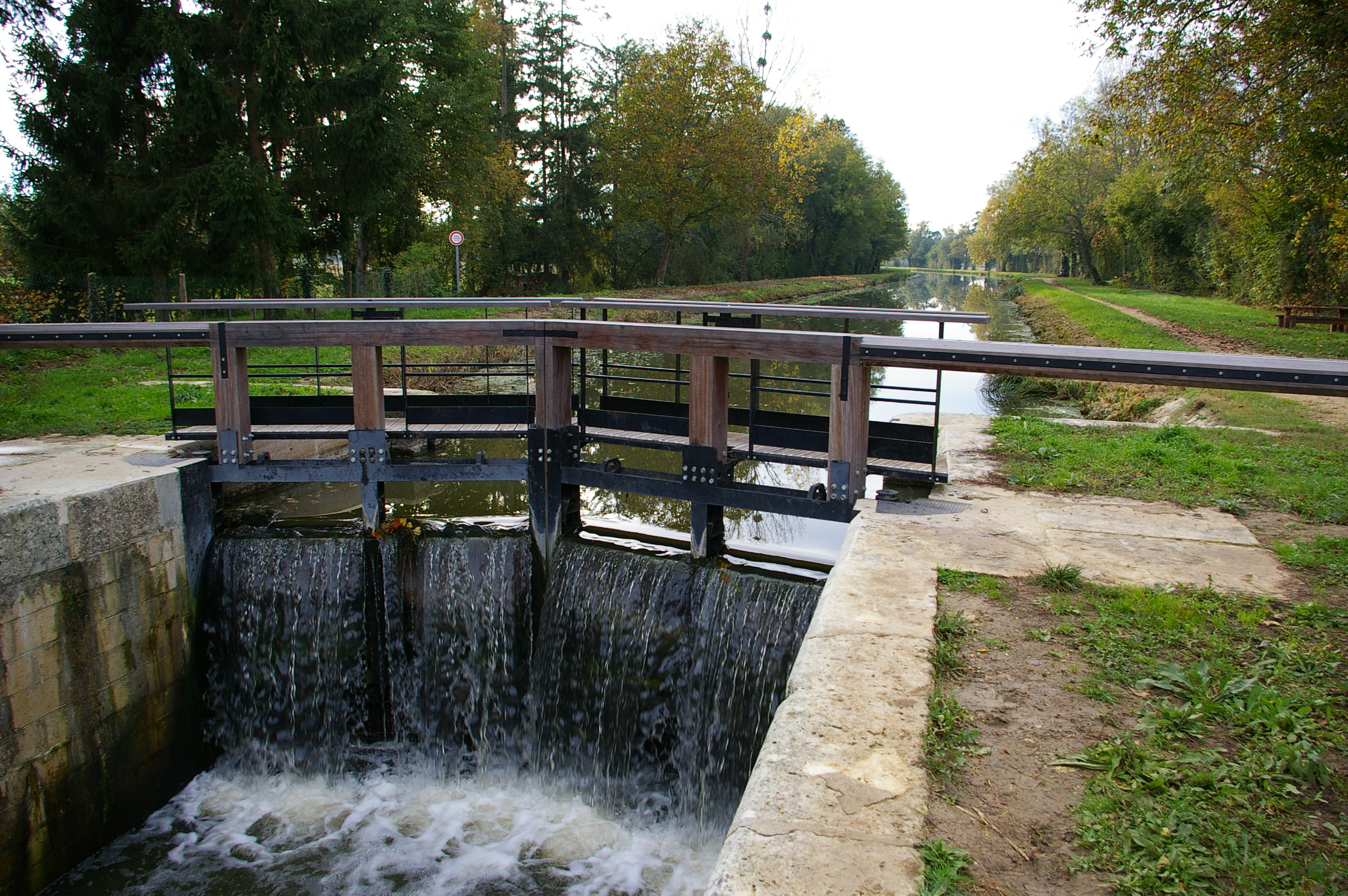
- The Chancy Lock, after restoration

- Coat of arms
- Location of Presnoy
- Location within France Location within Centre-Val de Loire
- Coordinates: 47°57′23″N 2°33′17″E
- Country: France
- Region: Centre-Val de Loire
- Department: Loiret
- Arrondissement: Montargis
- Canton: Lorris
- Intercommunality: Canaux et Forêts en Gâtinais

Government
  - Mayor (2023–2026): Loïc Redjdal
- Area^{1}: 8.00 km^{2} (3.09 sq mi)
- Highest elevation: 110 m (360 ft)
- Lowest elevation: 92 m (302 ft)
- Population (2023): 257
  - Density: 32.1/km^{2} (83.2/sq mi)
- Time zone: UTC+01:00 (CET)
  - Summer (DST): UTC+02:00 (CEST)
- INSEE/Postal code: 45256 /45260
- ^{1} French Land Register data, which excludes lakes, ponds, glaciers > 1 km^{2} (0.386 sq mi or 247 acres) and river estuaries.

Presnoy (French pronunciation: [pʁɛnwa]) is a commune in the Loiret department in north-central France.

== See also ==
- Communes of the Loiret department
