= Fontainejean Abbey =

Cistercian monastery in Loiret, France

Coordinates: 47°50′53″N 2°57′37″E

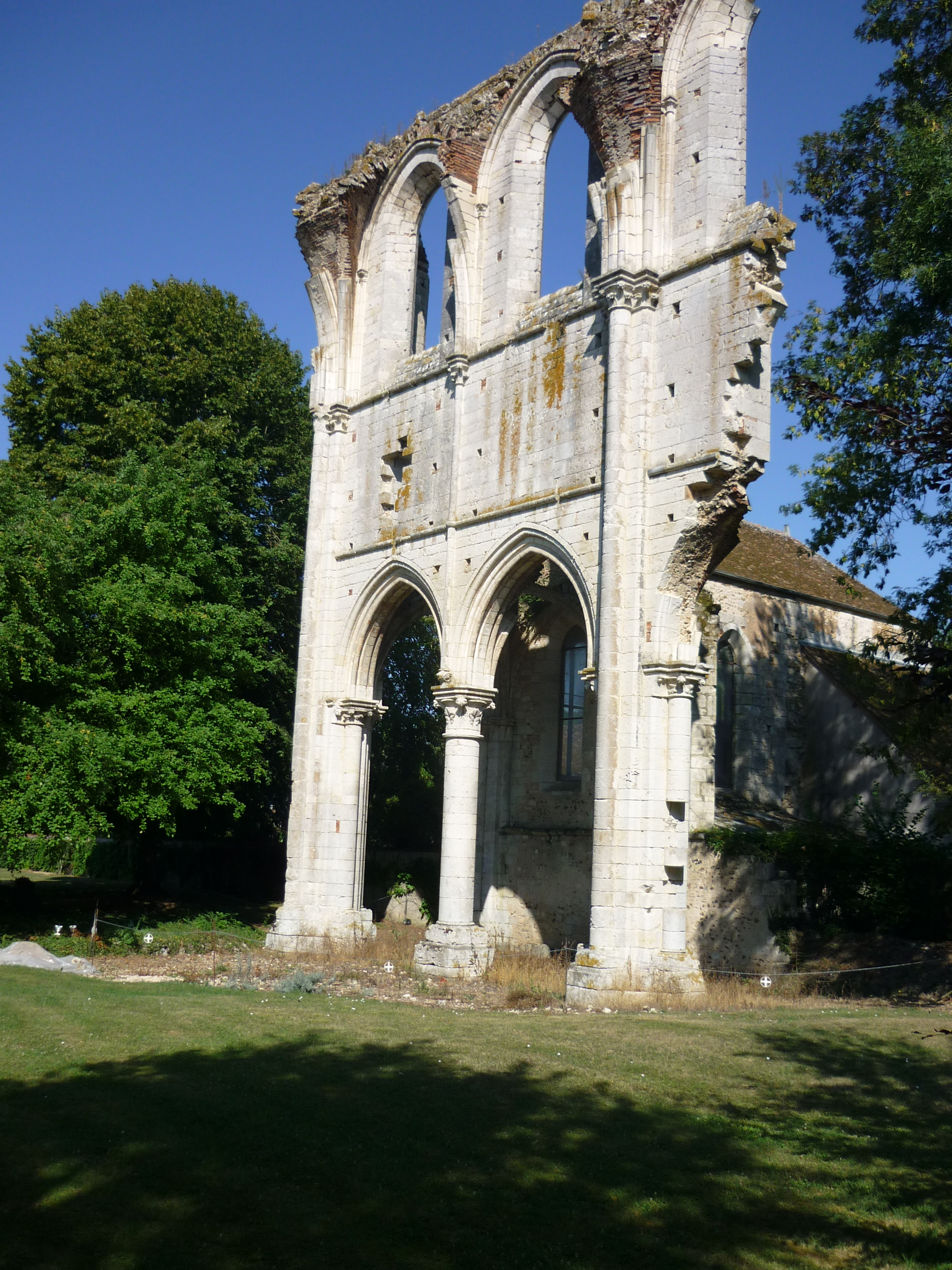
Abbey church ruins

Fontainejean Abbey, otherwise Fontaine-Jean Abbey (French: Abbaye de Fontainejean or Fontaine-Jean), was a Cistercian monastery in the commune of Saint-Maurice-sur-Aveyron in the Gâtinais in the département of Loiret, France.

It was founded in 1124 as a daughter house of Pontigny Abbey by Miles de Courtenay, who had previously also founded Les Écharlis Abbey. Fontainejean became the burial place of the Courtenay family. It was occupied by Protestant troops in 1562, when the church was ruined. The abbey was suppressed during 1791 in the French Revolution.

Little remains of the structures except for the north arm of the transept of the church with chapels and part of the wall of the choir, and also part of the 13th-century grange.

== Sources ==
- Bernard Peugniez, 2001: Routier cistercien. Abbayes et sites. France, Belgique, Luxembourg, Suisse (pp. 110–111; new expanded edition). Éditions Gaud: Moisenay ISBN 2840800446
- Eugène Jarossay: Histoire de l'abbaye de Fontaine-Jean de l'ordre de Cîteaux, 1124-1790: avec pièces justificatives et gravures (382 pp). Orléans: H. Herluison, 1894
