= Saint-Maurice-sur-Aveyron =

- Commune
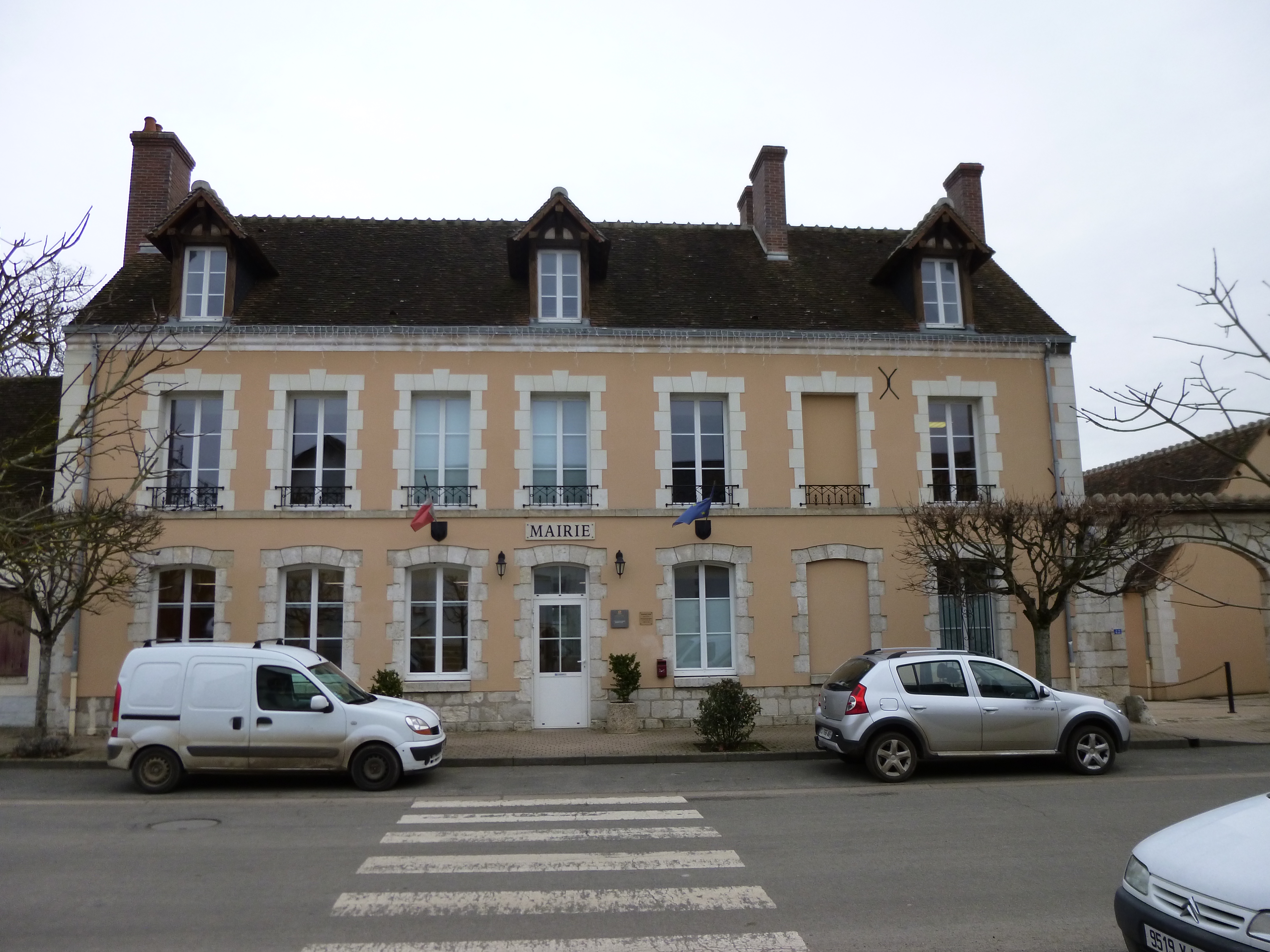
- The town hall in Saint-Maurice-sur-Aveyron

- Coat of arms
- Location of Saint-Maurice-sur-Aveyron
- Location within France Location within Centre-Val de Loire
- Coordinates: 47°51′00″N 2°55′37″E
- Country: France
- Region: Centre-Val de Loire
- Department: Loiret
- Arrondissement: Montargis
- Canton: Lorris
- Intercommunality: Canaux et Forêts en Gâtinais

Government
  - Mayor (2020–2026): Wondwossen Kassa
- Area^{1}: 53.76 km^{2} (20.76 sq mi)
- Highest elevation: 203 m (666 ft)
- Lowest elevation: 127 m (417 ft)
- Population (2023): 836
  - Density: 15.6/km^{2} (40.3/sq mi)
- Demonym: Saint Mauriciens
- Time zone: UTC+01:00 (CET)
  - Summer (DST): UTC+02:00 (CEST)
- INSEE/Postal code: 45292 /45230
- ^{1} French Land Register data, which excludes lakes, ponds, glaciers > 1 km^{2} (0.386 sq mi or 247 acres) and river estuaries.

Saint-Maurice-sur-Aveyron (French pronunciation: [sɛ̃ mɔʁis syʁ aveʁɔ̃]; literally "Saint-Maurice on Aveyron") is a commune in the Loiret department, central France.

== Geography ==
The village is located in the central western part of the commune, above the right bank of the Aveyron.

The commune contains the site of the former Fontainejean Abbey.

== See also ==
- Communes of the Loiret department
