= Thimory =

- Commune
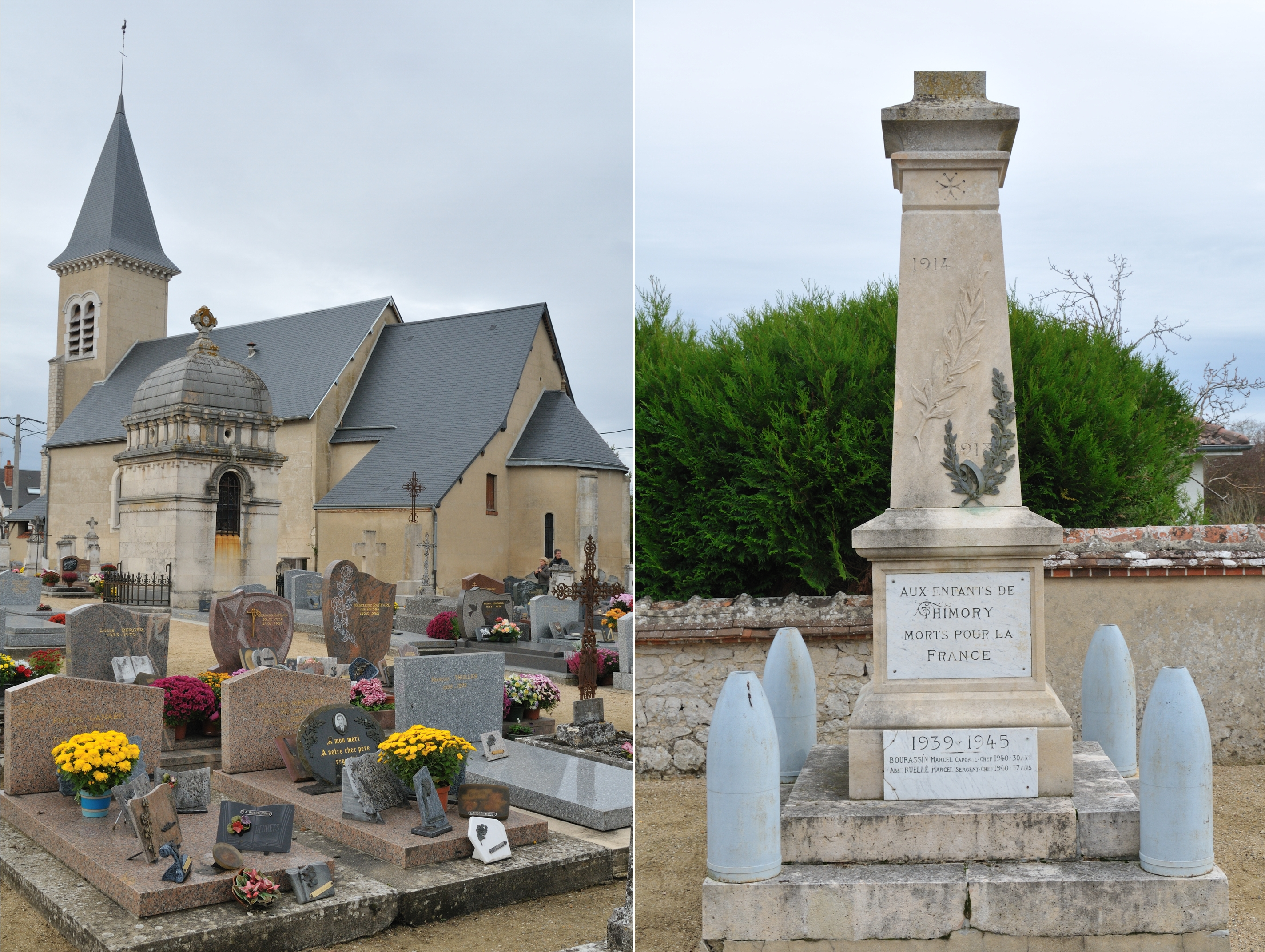
- The church and the war memorial in Thimory

- Coat of arms
- Location of Thimory
- Location within France Location within Centre-Val de Loire
- Coordinates: 47°55′17″N 2°38′02″E
- Country: France
- Region: Centre-Val de Loire
- Department: Loiret
- Arrondissement: Montargis
- Canton: Lorris
- Intercommunality: Canaux et Forêts en Gâtinais

Government
  - Mayor (2020–2026): Magali Goiset
- Area^{1}: 12.37 km^{2} (4.78 sq mi)
- Highest elevation: 117 m (384 ft)
- Lowest elevation: 97 m (318 ft)
- Population (2023): 684
  - Density: 55.3/km^{2} (143/sq mi)
- Demonym: Thimoriens
- Time zone: UTC+01:00 (CET)
  - Summer (DST): UTC+02:00 (CEST)
- INSEE/Postal code: 45321 /45260
- ^{1} French Land Register data, which excludes lakes, ponds, glaciers > 1 km^{2} (0.386 sq mi or 247 acres) and river estuaries.

Thimory (French pronunciation: [timɔʁi]) is a commune in the Loiret department in north-central France.

== See also ==
- Communes of the Loiret department
