= Canton of Lorris =

Coordinates: 47°53′N 2°35′E

Lorris
- Canton
- Interactive map of Lorris
- Country: France
- Region: Centre-Val de Loire
- Department: Loiret
- No. of communes: {{{nbcomm}}}
- Area: 752.52 km^{2} (290.55 sq mi)
- Population (2023): 27,448
  - Density: 36.475/km^{2} (94.469/sq mi)
- INSEE code: 4508

The canton of Lorris is a canton of the Loiret département, in the Centre-Val de Loire région of France. 37 of its 38 communes are part of the arrondissement of Montargis.

== Communes ==
Since the French canton reorganisation which came into effect in March 2015, the communes of the canton of Lorris are:

1. Aillant-sur-Milleron
2. Auvilliers-en-Gâtinais
3. Beauchamps-sur-Huillard
4. Bellegarde
5. Chailly-en-Gâtinais
6. La Chapelle-sur-Aveyron
7. Chapelon
8. Le Charme
9. Châtenoy
10. Châtillon-Coligny
11. Cortrat
12. Coudroy
13. La Cour-Marigny
14. Dammarie-sur-Loing
15. Fréville-du-Gâtinais
16. Ladon
17. Lorris
18. Mézières-en-Gâtinais
19. Montbouy
20. Montcresson
21. Montereau
22. Moulon
23. Nesploy
24. Nogent-sur-Vernisson
25. Noyers
26. Oussoy-en-Gâtinais
27. Ouzouer-des-Champs
28. Ouzouer-sous-Bellegarde
29. Presnoy
30. Pressigny-les-Pins
31. Quiers-sur-Bézonde
32. Saint-Hilaire-sur-Puiseaux
33. Saint-Maurice-sur-Aveyron
34. Sainte-Geneviève-des-Bois
35. Thimory
36. Varennes-Changy
37. Vieilles-Maisons-sur-Joudry
38. Villemoutiers

== Mayors of the canton of Lorris ==
- November 10, 1833 - July 7, 1850, Pierre Barthélémy Garnier, doctorate in Medicine and the mayor of Montargis
- July 7, 1850 - June 15–17, 1861, Louis Henri Prochasson,
- June 15–17, 1861 - June 12, 1870, Michel Félix de Violaine, inspector of the forests
- June 12, 1870 - June 30, 1901, Charles Joseph Nouette-Delorme, doctorate in medicine and mayor of Ouzouer-des-Champs
- June 30, 1901 - December 14, 1919, Louis Lucien Naudin
- December 14, 1919 - January 5, 1936, Marceau Thomas
- January 5, 1936 - March 7, 1937 - Constant Renard
- March 7, 1937, Constant Leturcq
- 1996 -, Guy Parmentier
