= Beauchamps-sur-Huillard =

- Commune
- Coat of arms
- Location of Beauchamps-sur-Huillard
- Location within France Location within Centre-Val de Loire
- Coordinates: 47°56′21″N 2°27′00″E
- Country: France
- Region: Centre-Val de Loire
- Department: Loiret
- Arrondissement: Montargis
- Canton: Lorris
- Intercommunality: Canaux et Forêts en Gâtinais

Government
  - Mayor (2020–2026): Emmanuelle Pion
- Area^{1}: 18.09 km^{2} (6.98 sq mi)
- Highest elevation: 130 m (430 ft)
- Lowest elevation: 96 m (315 ft)
- Population (2023): 419
  - Density: 23.2/km^{2} (60.0/sq mi)
- Time zone: UTC+01:00 (CET)
  - Summer (DST): UTC+02:00 (CEST)
- INSEE/Postal code: 45027 /45270
- ^{1} French Land Register data, which excludes lakes, ponds, glaciers > 1 km^{2} (0.386 sq mi or 247 acres) and river estuaries.

Beauchamps-sur-Huillard (French pronunciation: [boʃɑ̃ syʁ ɥijaʁ]) is a commune in the Loiret department in north-central France.

== Geography ==
The commune of Beauchamps-sur-Huillard is located in the northeast quadrant of the Loiret department, in the agricultural region of Orléanais. It is located 40.8 km from Orléans, the prefecture of the department, 22.9 km from Montargis, the sub-prefecture, and 5.7 km from Bellegarde, the former capital of the canton on which the commune depended before March 2015. The commune is part of the Bellegard-Quiers-sur-Bézonde catchment area, from which it is 5.7 km away.

The closest communes are : Coudroy (3.6 km), Auvilliers-en-Gâtinais (4.6 km), Châtenoy (4.7 km), Bellegarde (5.7 km), Ouzouer-sous-Bellegarde (5.9 km), Vieilles-Maisons-sur-Joudry (6 km), Noyers (6.1 km), Quiers-sur-Bézonde (6.8 km), Chailly-en-Gâtinais (7 km) and Lorris (7.3 km).

== Hydrography ==
The Huillard and the Orleans canal cross the territory of the commune.

== History ==
Between January 29 and February 8, 1939, more than 2,800 Spanish refugees fleeing the collapse of the Spanish Republic in the face of Franco's troops arrived in the Loiret. Faced with inadequate infrastructure in Orléans, 46 rural reception centers were opened, including one in Beauchamps-sur-Huillard. The refugees, mainly women and children (the men were disarmed and held in the South of France), were subjected to strict quarantine, vaccinated, mail was limited, and supplies, although not very varied and cooked French-style, were nevertheless provided. Some of the refugees returned to Spain, encouraged by the French government, which facilitated the conditions of return, those who preferred to stay were grouped together at the Aydes glass factory camp in Fleury-les-Aubrais.

== Population ==
Historical population
Year	Pop.	±% p.a.
1968	353	—
1975	325	−1.17%
1982	276	−2.31%
1990	266	−0.46%
1999	334	+2.56%
2007	401	+2.31%
2012	415	+0.69%
2017	405	−0.49%
2023	419	+0.57%
Source: INSEE

== See also ==
- Communes of the Loiret department
