= Ladon, Loiret =

Ladon
- Commune
- Coat of arms
- Location of Ladon
- Location within France Location within Centre-Val de Loire
- Coordinates: 48°00′12″N 2°32′22″E
- Country: France
- Region: Centre-Val de Loire
- Department: Loiret
- Arrondissement: Montargis
- Canton: Lorris
- Intercommunality: Canaux et Forêts en Gâtinais

Government
  - Mayor (2020–2026): Albert Février
- Area^{1}: 13.75 km^{2} (5.31 sq mi)
- Highest elevation: 108 m (354 ft)
- Lowest elevation: 89 m (292 ft)
- Population (2023): 1,392
  - Density: 101.2/km^{2} (262.2/sq mi)
- Demonym: Ladonnais
- Time zone: UTC+01:00 (CET)
  - Summer (DST): UTC+02:00 (CEST)
- INSEE/Postal code: 45178 /45270
- ^{1} French Land Register data, which excludes lakes, ponds, glaciers > 1 km^{2} (0.386 sq mi or 247 acres) and river estuaries.

Ladon (French pronunciation: [ladɔ̃]) is a commune in the Loiret department in north-central France.

== See also ==
- Communes of the Loiret department
