= Noyers, Loiret =

Noyers
- Commune
- Coat of arms
- Location of Noyers
- Location within France Location within Centre-Val de Loire
- Coordinates: 47°54′52″N 2°31′33″E
- Country: France
- Region: Centre-Val de Loire
- Department: Loiret
- Arrondissement: Montargis
- Canton: Lorris
- Intercommunality: Canaux et Forêts en Gâtinais

Government
  - Mayor (2020–2026): Marie-Annick Marceaux
- Area^{1}: 18.06 km^{2} (6.97 sq mi)
- Highest elevation: 134 m (440 ft)
- Lowest elevation: 98 m (322 ft)
- Population (2023): 755
  - Density: 41.8/km^{2} (108/sq mi)
- Time zone: UTC+01:00 (CET)
  - Summer (DST): UTC+02:00 (CEST)
- INSEE/Postal code: 45230 /45260
- ^{1} French Land Register data, which excludes lakes, ponds, glaciers > 1 km^{2} (0.386 sq mi or 247 acres) and river estuaries.

Noyers (French pronunciation: [nwaje]) is a commune in the Loiret department in north-central France.

== See also ==
- Communes of the Loiret department
