= Le Charme =

- Commune
- Location of Le Charme
- Location within France Location within Centre-Val de Loire
- Coordinates: 47°48′01″N 2°59′42″E
- Country: France
- Region: Centre-Val de Loire
- Department: Loiret
- Arrondissement: Montargis
- Canton: Lorris
- Intercommunality: Canaux et Forêts en Gâtinais

Government
  - Mayor (2020–2026): Isabelle Robineau
- Area^{1}: 13.82 km^{2} (5.34 sq mi)
- Highest elevation: 198 m (650 ft)
- Lowest elevation: 164 m (538 ft)
- Population (2023): 139
  - Density: 10.1/km^{2} (26.0/sq mi)
- Demonym: Charmois
- Time zone: UTC+01:00 (CET)
  - Summer (DST): UTC+02:00 (CEST)
- INSEE/Postal code: 45079 /45230
- ^{1} French Land Register data, which excludes lakes, ponds, glaciers > 1 km^{2} (0.386 sq mi or 247 acres) and river estuaries.

Le Charme (French pronunciation: [lə ʃaʁm]) is a commune in the Loiret department in north-central France.

== Geography ==
The commune is traversed by the river Aveyron.

== See also ==
- Communes of the Loiret department
