= Le Moulinet-sur-Solin =

- Commune
- Coat of arms
- Location of Le Moulinet-sur-Solin
- Location within France Location within Centre-Val de Loire
- Coordinates: 47°50′17″N 2°37′38″E
- Country: France
- Region: Centre-Val de Loire
- Department: Loiret
- Arrondissement: Montargis
- Canton: Gien
- Intercommunality: CC Giennoises

Government
  - Mayor (2020–2026): Christiane Lafaye
- Area^{1}: 19.37 km^{2} (7.48 sq mi)
- Highest elevation: 177 m (581 ft)
- Lowest elevation: 123 m (404 ft)
- Population (2023): 136
  - Density: 7.02/km^{2} (18.2/sq mi)
- Demonym: Moulinetois
- Time zone: UTC+01:00 (CET)
  - Summer (DST): UTC+02:00 (CEST)
- INSEE/Postal code: 45218 /45290
- ^{1} French Land Register data, which excludes lakes, ponds, glaciers > 1 km^{2} (0.386 sq mi or 247 acres) and river estuaries.

Le Moulinet-sur-Solin (French pronunciation: [lə mulinɛ syʁ sɔlɛ̃], literally Le Moulinet on Solin) is a commune in the Loiret department in north-central France.

== Geography ==
The river Solin has its source in the commune.

== See also ==
- Communes of the Loiret department
