= Moulon, Loiret =

Moulon
- Commune
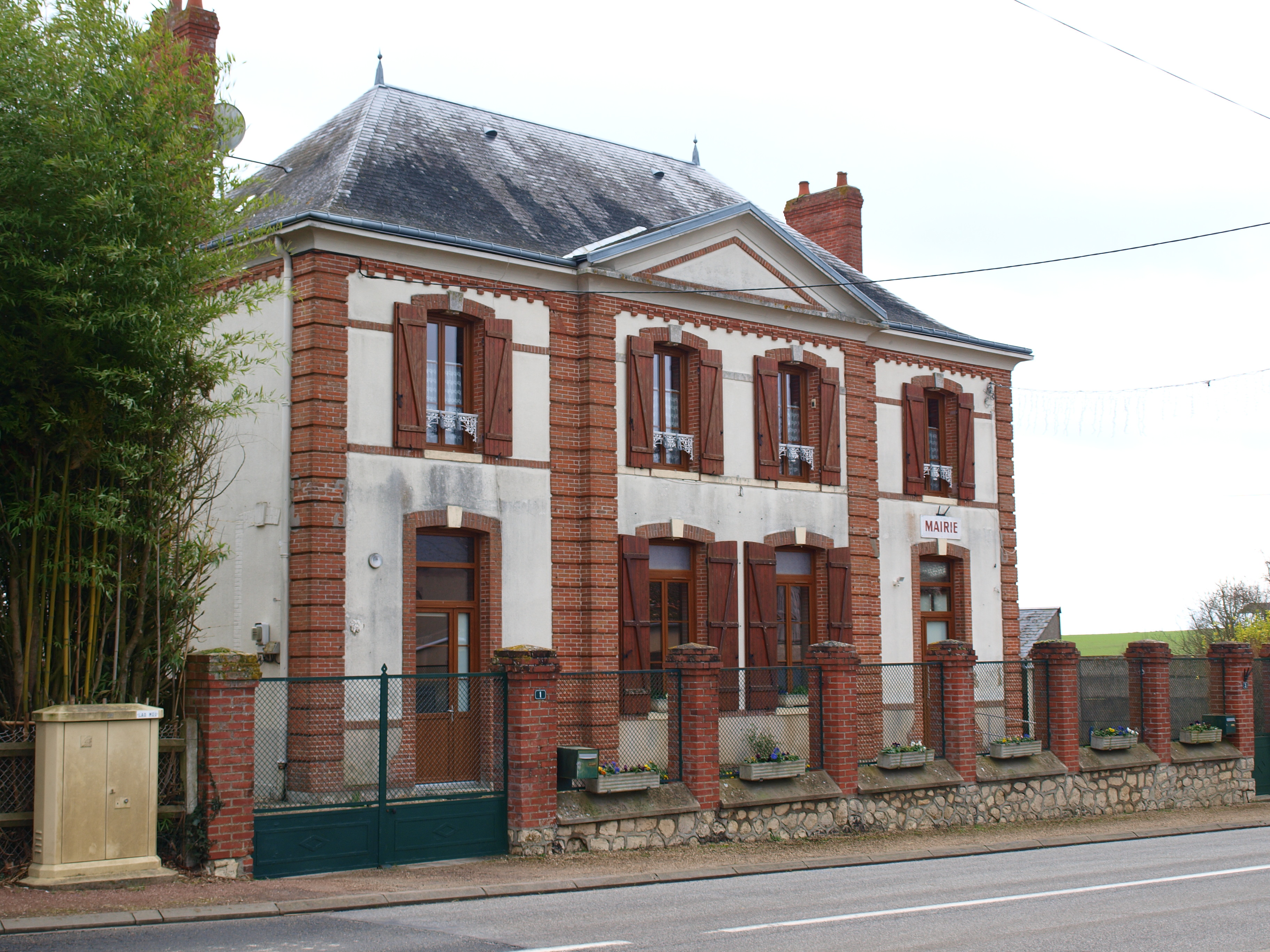
- The town hall in Moulon

- Coat of arms
- Location of Moulon
- Location within France Location within Centre-Val de Loire
- Coordinates: 48°01′13″N 2°35′31″E
- Country: France
- Region: Centre-Val de Loire
- Department: Loiret
- Arrondissement: Montargis
- Canton: Lorris
- Intercommunality: Canaux et Forêts en Gâtinais

Government
  - Mayor (2020–2026): André Petit
- Area^{1}: 9.40 km^{2} (3.63 sq mi)
- Highest elevation: 109 m (358 ft)
- Lowest elevation: 87 m (285 ft)
- Population (2023): 178
  - Density: 18.9/km^{2} (49.0/sq mi)
- Time zone: UTC+01:00 (CET)
  - Summer (DST): UTC+02:00 (CEST)
- INSEE/Postal code: 45219 /45270
- ^{1} French Land Register data, which excludes lakes, ponds, glaciers > 1 km^{2} (0.386 sq mi or 247 acres) and river estuaries.

Moulon (French pronunciation: [mulɔ̃]) is a commune in the Loiret department in north-central France.

== See also ==
- Communes of the Loiret department
