= Dammarie-sur-Loing =

- Commune
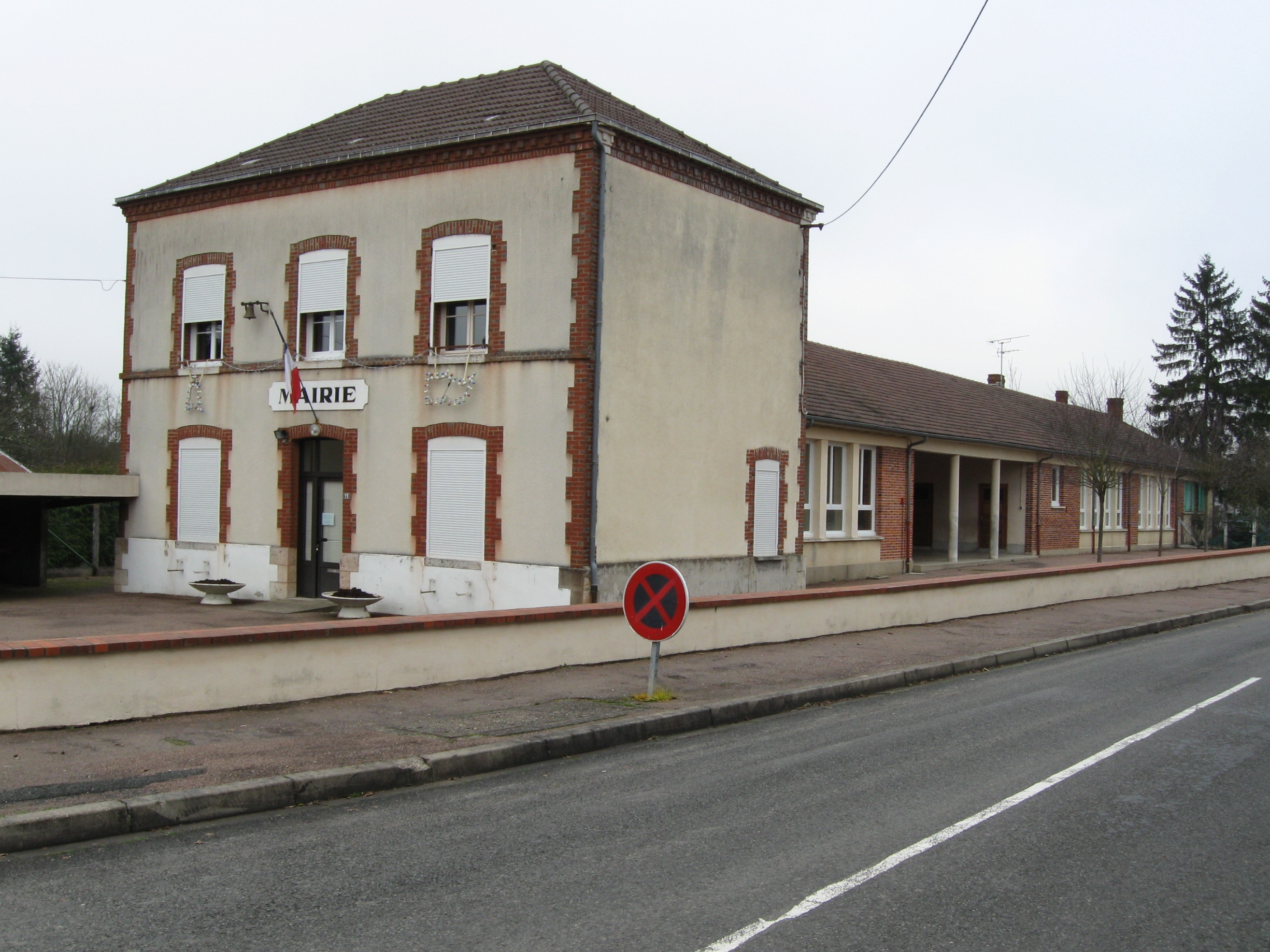
- The town hall in Dammarie-sur-Loing
- Location of Dammarie-sur-Loing
- Location within France Location within Centre-Val de Loire
- Coordinates: 47°47′23″N 2°53′30″E
- Country: France
- Region: Centre-Val de Loire
- Department: Loiret
- Arrondissement: Montargis
- Canton: Lorris
- Intercommunality: Canaux et Forêts en Gâtinais

Government
  - Mayor (2020–2026): Alexandre Ducardonnet
- Area^{1}: 20.94 km^{2} (8.08 sq mi)
- Highest elevation: 177 m (581 ft)
- Lowest elevation: 126 m (413 ft)
- Population (2023): 455
  - Density: 21.7/km^{2} (56.3/sq mi)
- Demonym: Dammariens
- Time zone: UTC+01:00 (CET)
  - Summer (DST): UTC+02:00 (CEST)
- INSEE/Postal code: 45121 /45230
- ^{1} French Land Register data, which excludes lakes, ponds, glaciers > 1 km^{2} (0.386 sq mi or 247 acres) and river estuaries.

Dammarie-sur-Loing (French pronunciation: [damaʁi syʁ lwɛ̃], literally Dammarie on Loing) is a commune in the Loiret department in north-central France.

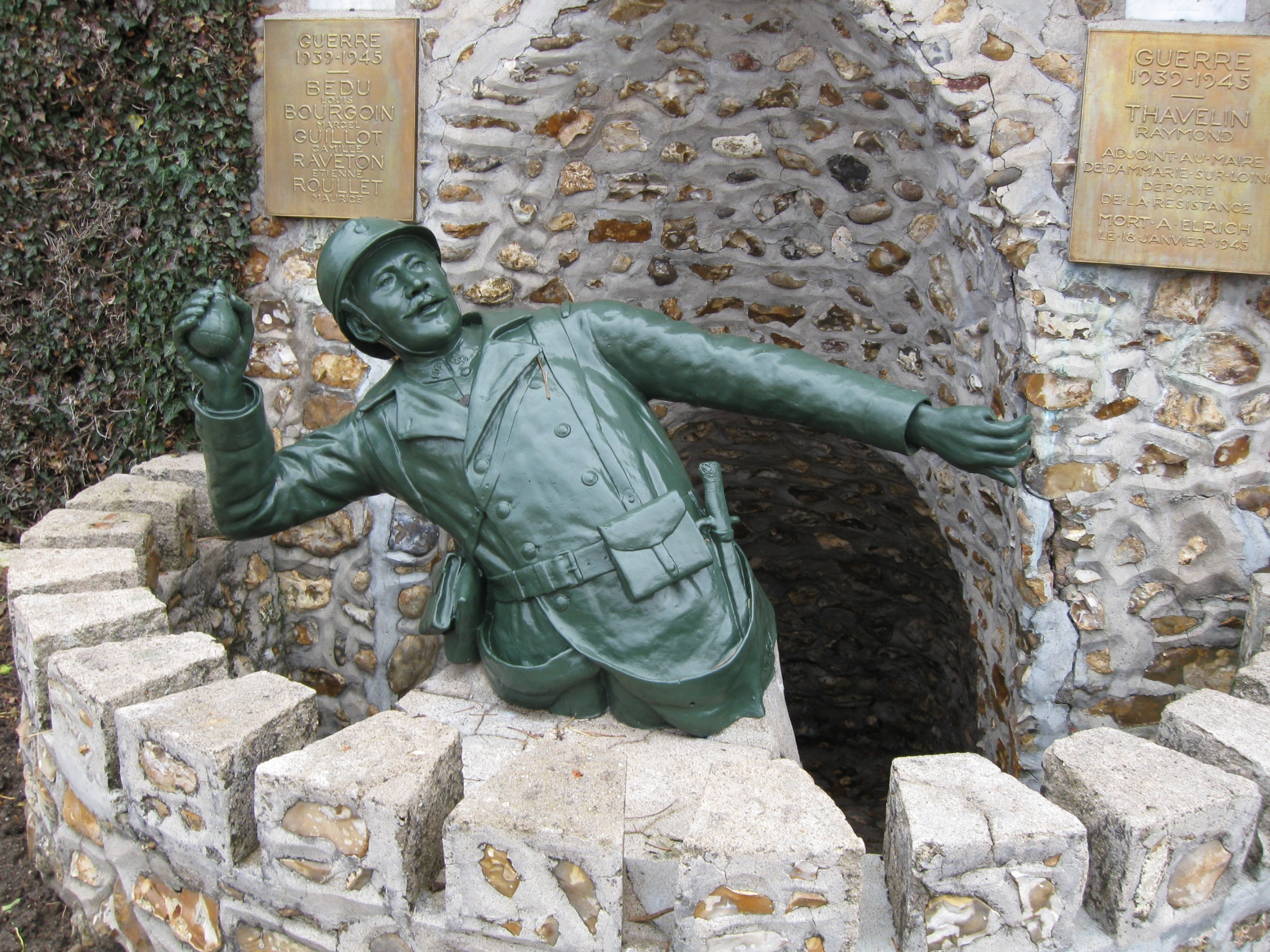
Detail of the war memorial.

== See also ==
- Communes of the Loiret department
