= Varennes-Changy =

- Commune
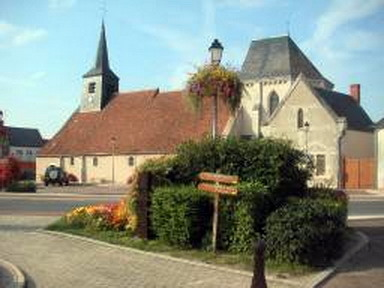
- The church square in Varennes-Changy
- Location of Varennes-Changy
- Location within France Location within Centre-Val de Loire
- Coordinates: 47°52′00″N 2°40′00″E
- Country: France
- Region: Centre-Val de Loire
- Department: Loiret
- Arrondissement: Montargis
- Canton: Lorris
- Intercommunality: Canaux et Forêts en Gâtinais

Government
  - Mayor (2020–2026): Evelyne Couteau
- Area^{1}: 29.77 km^{2} (11.49 sq mi)
- Highest elevation: 154 m (505 ft)
- Lowest elevation: 103 m (338 ft)
- Population (2023): 1,503
  - Density: 50.49/km^{2} (130.8/sq mi)
- Demonym: Varennois
- Time zone: UTC+01:00 (CET)
  - Summer (DST): UTC+02:00 (CEST)
- INSEE/Postal code: 45332 /45290
- ^{1} French Land Register data, which excludes lakes, ponds, glaciers > 1 km^{2} (0.386 sq mi or 247 acres) and river estuaries.

Varennes-Changy (French pronunciation: [vaʁɛn ʃɑ̃ʒi]) is a commune in the eastern part of the Loiret department in north-central France. Varennes-Changy was formed from the merger on 1 January 1971 between the former communes of Varennes-en-Gâtinais and Changy.

== See also ==
- Communes of the Loiret department
