= Coudroy =

- Commune
- Location of Coudroy
- Location within France Location within Centre-Val de Loire
- Coordinates: 47°54′31″N 2°28′04″E
- Country: France
- Region: Centre-Val de Loire
- Department: Loiret
- Arrondissement: Montargis
- Canton: Lorris
- Intercommunality: Canaux et Forêts en Gâtinais

Government
  - Mayor (2020–2026): Christiane Flores
- Area^{1}: 14.73 km^{2} (5.69 sq mi)
- Elevation: 110 m (360 ft)
- Population (2023): 291
  - Density: 19.8/km^{2} (51.2/sq mi)
- Demonym: Coudroyens
- Time zone: UTC+01:00 (CET)
  - Summer (DST): UTC+02:00 (CEST)
- INSEE/Postal code: 45107 /45260
- ^{1} French Land Register data, which excludes lakes, ponds, glaciers > 1 km^{2} (0.386 sq mi or 247 acres) and river estuaries.

Coudroy (French pronunciation: [kudʁwa]) is a commune in the Loiret department in north-central France.

== See also ==
- Communes of the Loiret department
