= La Cour-Marigny =

- Commune
- Coat of arms
- Location of La Cour-Marigny
- Location within France Location within Centre-Val de Loire
- Coordinates: 47°53′40″N 2°35′53″E
- Country: France
- Region: Centre-Val de Loire
- Department: Loiret
- Arrondissement: Montargis
- Canton: Lorris
- Intercommunality: Canaux et Forêts en Gâtinais

Government
  - Mayor (2020–2026): Pierre Martinon
- Area^{1}: 13.43 km^{2} (5.19 sq mi)
- Highest elevation: 121 m (397 ft)
- Lowest elevation: 108 m (354 ft)
- Population (2023): 379
  - Density: 28.2/km^{2} (73.1/sq mi)
- Demonym: Curti-Marignacais
- Time zone: UTC+01:00 (CET)
  - Summer (DST): UTC+02:00 (CEST)
- INSEE/Postal code: 45112 /45260
- ^{1} French Land Register data, which excludes lakes, ponds, glaciers > 1 km^{2} (0.386 sq mi or 247 acres) and river estuaries.

La Cour-Marigny (French pronunciation: [la kuʁ maʁiɲi]) is a commune in the Loiret department in north-central France.

== Geography ==
The commune is traversed by the river Solin.

== See also ==
- Communes of the Loiret department
