= Cortrat =

- Commune
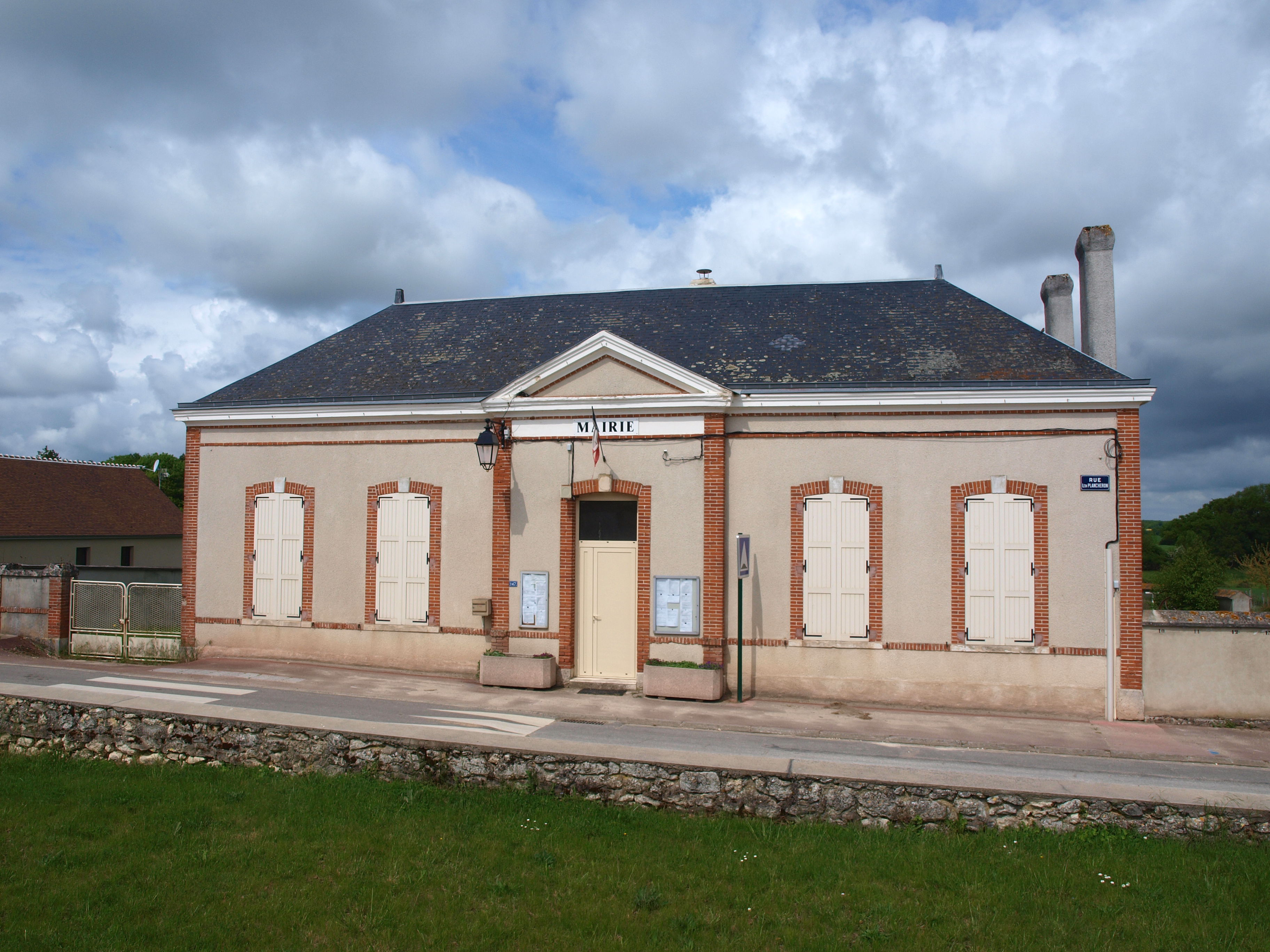
- The town hall in Cortrat
- Location of Cortrat
- Location within France Location within Centre-Val de Loire
- Coordinates: 47°53′51″N 2°45′57″E
- Country: France
- Region: Centre-Val de Loire
- Department: Loiret
- Arrondissement: Montargis
- Canton: Lorris
- Intercommunality: Canaux et Forêts en Gâtinais

Government
  - Mayor (2020–2026): Christèle Bezilles
- Area^{1}: 11.03 km^{2} (4.26 sq mi)
- Highest elevation: 132 m (433 ft)
- Lowest elevation: 95 m (312 ft)
- Population (2023): 80
  - Density: 7.3/km^{2} (19/sq mi)
- Demonym: Cortrèziens
- Time zone: UTC+01:00 (CET)
  - Summer (DST): UTC+02:00 (CEST)
- INSEE/Postal code: 45105 /
- ^{1} French Land Register data, which excludes lakes, ponds, glaciers > 1 km^{2} (0.386 sq mi or 247 acres) and river estuaries.

Cortrat (French pronunciation: [kɔʁtʁa]) is a commune in the Loiret department in north-central France.

== See also ==
- Communes of the Loiret department
