= Solin (river) =

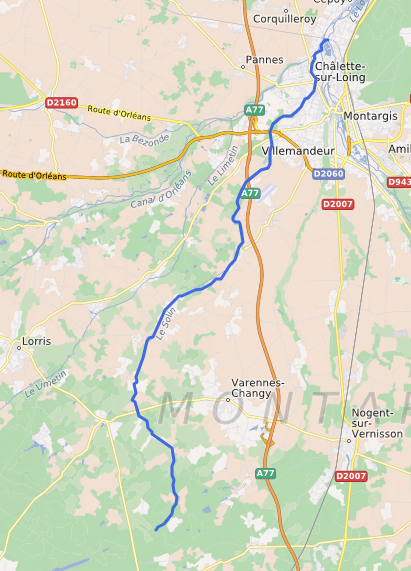

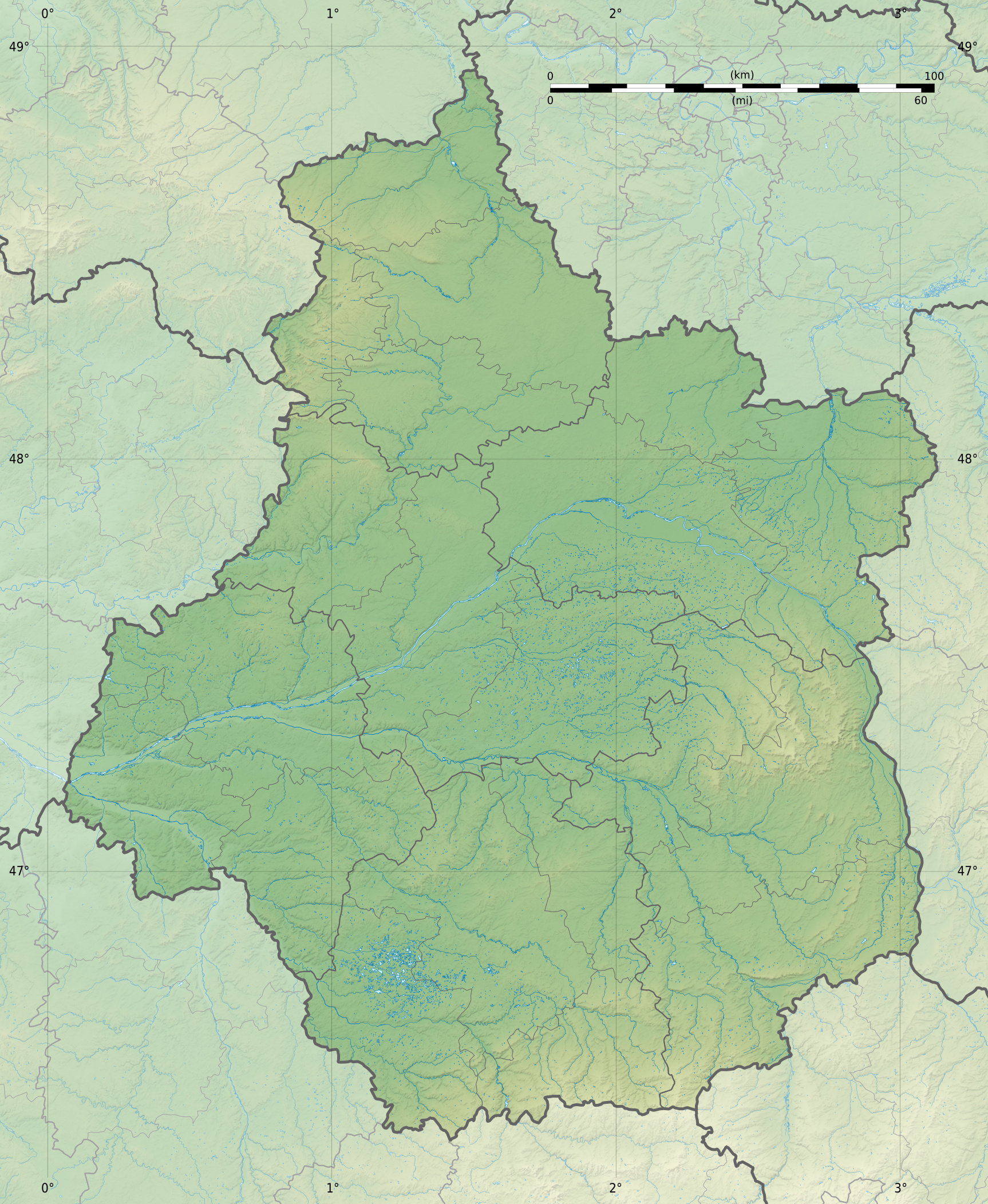
- Location within France Location within Centre-Val de Loire

Location
- Country: France

Physical characteristics
- Source
  - location: Le Moulinet-sur-Solin
  - coordinates: 47°48′42″N 02°37′07″E
- Mouth
  - location: Loing
  - coordinates: 48°01′33″N 02°43′23″E
- Length: 32.5 km (20.2 mi)

Basin features
- Progression: Loing→ Seine→ English Channel

The Solin is a 32.5-kilometre (20.2 mi) long river in the Loiret department in north-central France. Its source is at Le Moulinet-sur-Solin, 2 kilometres (1.2 mi) south of the village. It flows generally north-northeast. It is a left tributary of the Loing, into which it flows at Châlette-sur-Loing.

== Communes along its course ==
This list is ordered from source to mouth:

- Loiret: Le Moulinet-sur-Solin, Montereau, La Cour-Marigny, Oussoy-en-Gâtinais, Vimory, Villemandeur, Châlette-sur-Loing.
