= Ouzouer-sous-Bellegarde =

- Commune
- Coat of arms
- Location of Ouzouer-sous-Bellegarde
- Location within France Location within Centre-Val de Loire
- Coordinates: 47°59′35″N 2°27′58″E
- Country: France
- Region: Centre-Val de Loire
- Department: Loiret
- Arrondissement: Montargis
- Canton: Lorris
- Intercommunality: Canaux et Forêts en Gâtinais

Government
  - Mayor (2020–2026): Claude Fouassier
- Area^{1}: 11.57 km^{2} (4.47 sq mi)
- Highest elevation: 125 m (410 ft)
- Lowest elevation: 99 m (325 ft)
- Population (2023): 311
  - Density: 26.9/km^{2} (69.6/sq mi)
- Demonym: Oratoriens
- Time zone: UTC+01:00 (CET)
  - Summer (DST): UTC+02:00 (CEST)
- INSEE/Postal code: 45243 /45270
- ^{1} French Land Register data, which excludes lakes, ponds, glaciers > 1 km^{2} (0.386 sq mi or 247 acres) and river estuaries.

Ouzouer-sous-Bellegarde is a commune in the Loiret department in north-central France.

== See also ==
- Communes of the Loiret department
