= Sainte-Geneviève-des-Bois, Loiret =

Sainte-Geneviève-des-Bois
- Commune
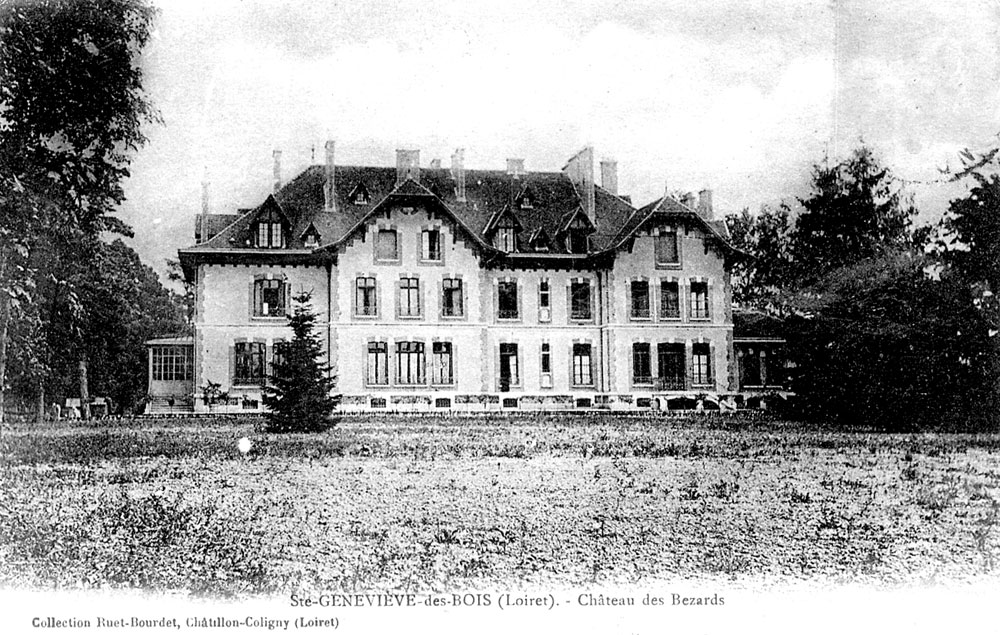
- Château des Bézards
- Location of Sainte-Geneviève-des-Bois
- Location within France Location within Centre-Val de Loire
- Coordinates: 47°49′01″N 2°49′01″E
- Country: France
- Region: Centre-Val de Loire
- Department: Loiret
- Arrondissement: Montargis
- Canton: Lorris
- Intercommunality: Canaux et Forêts en Gâtinais

Government
  - Mayor (2020–2026): André Jean
- Area^{1}: 40.74 km^{2} (15.73 sq mi)
- Population (2023): 1,054
  - Density: 25.87/km^{2} (67.01/sq mi)
- Time zone: UTC+01:00 (CET)
  - Summer (DST): UTC+02:00 (CEST)
- INSEE/Postal code: 45278 /45230
- ^{1} French Land Register data, which excludes lakes, ponds, glaciers > 1 km^{2} (0.386 sq mi or 247 acres) and river estuaries.

Sainte-Geneviève-des-Bois (French pronunciation: [sɛ̃t ʒənvjɛv de bwa]; lit. 'St Genevieve of the Woods') is a commune in the Loiret department in north-central France.

== Geography ==
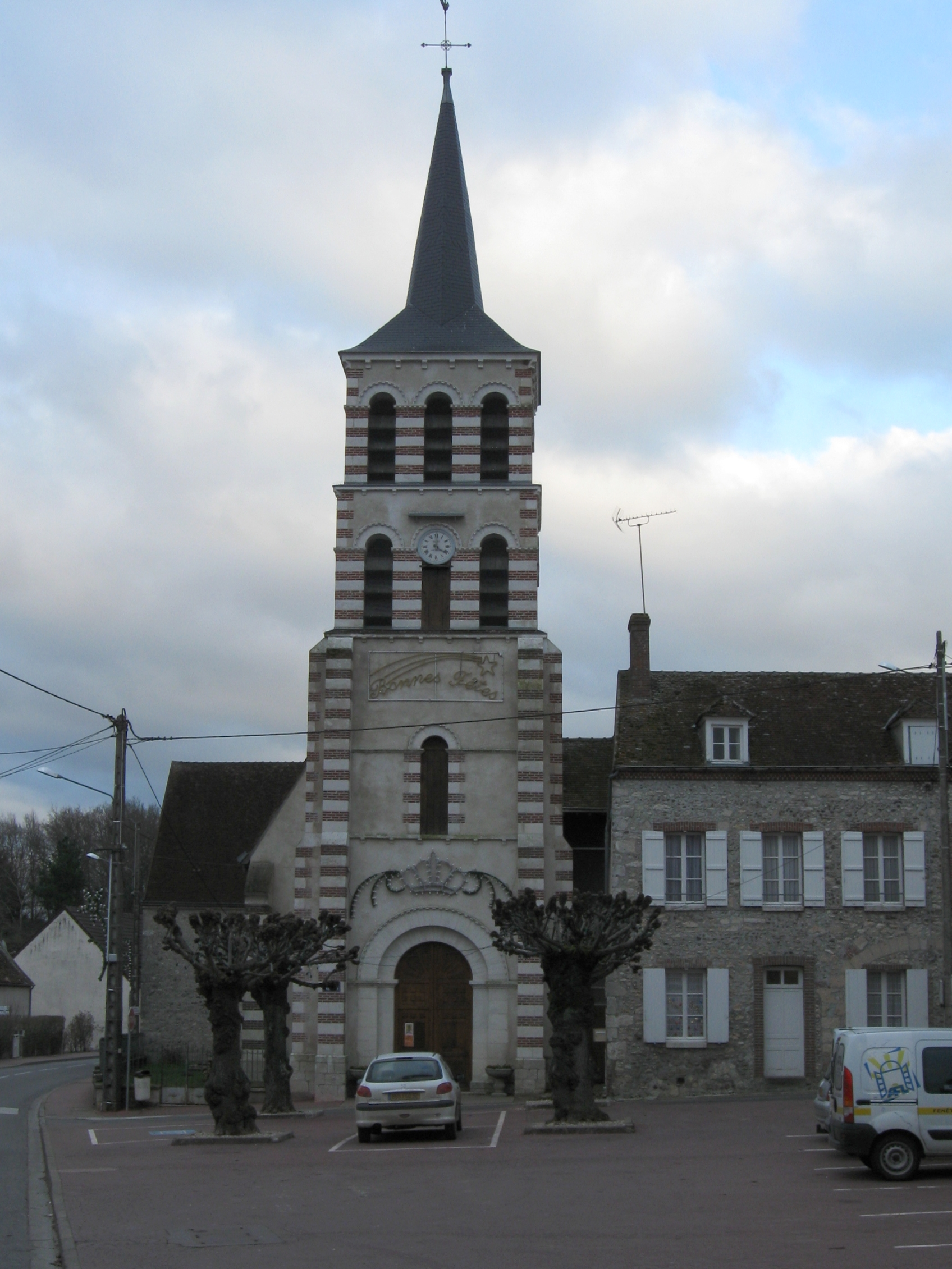
The church.

The villages lies in the middle of the commune, on the right bank of the Talot, which forms part of the commune's northern border, then flows into the Loing, which forms the commune's eastern border.

== See also ==
- Communes of the Loiret department
