= Montereau, Loiret =

Montereau
- Commune
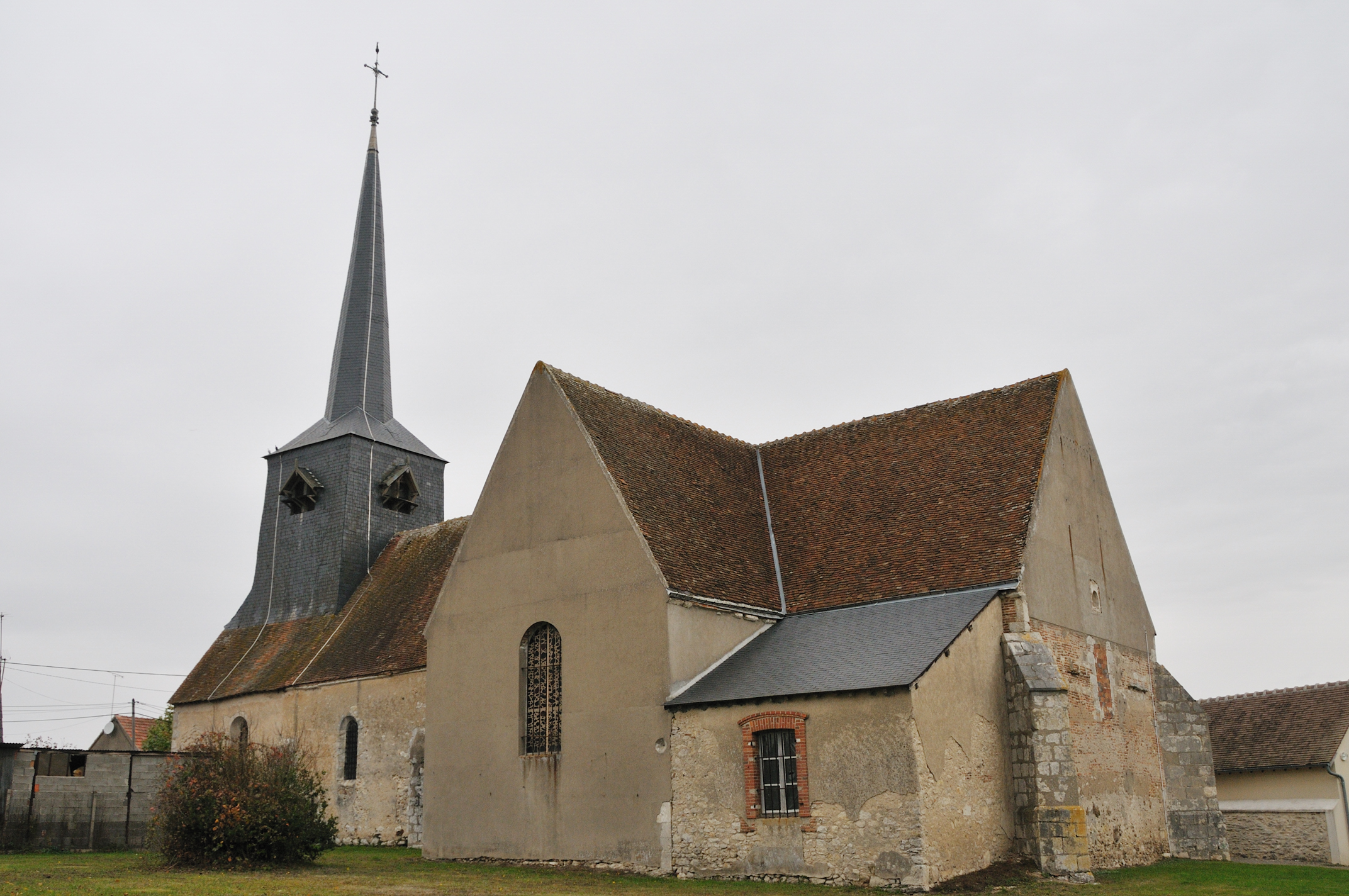
- The church in Montereau

- Coat of arms
- Location of Montereau
- Location within France Location within Centre-Val de Loire
- Coordinates: 47°51′25″N 2°34′24″E
- Country: France
- Region: Centre-Val de Loire
- Department: Loiret
- Arrondissement: Montargis
- Canton: Lorris
- Intercommunality: Canaux et Forêts en Gâtinais

Government
  - Mayor (2023–2026): Jacques Hebert
- Area^{1}: 50.12 km^{2} (19.35 sq mi)
- Population (2023): 645
  - Density: 12.9/km^{2} (33.3/sq mi)
- Demonym: Monterelais
- Time zone: UTC+01:00 (CET)
  - Summer (DST): UTC+02:00 (CEST)
- INSEE/Postal code: 45213 /45260
- ^{1} French Land Register data, which excludes lakes, ponds, glaciers > 1 km^{2} (0.386 sq mi or 247 acres) and river estuaries.

Montereau (French pronunciation: [mɔ̃tʁo]) is a commune in the Loiret department in north-central France.

== Geography ==
The commune is traversed by the river Solin.

== See also ==
- Communes of the Loiret department
