= Gâtinais =

Province of France

Coordinates: 48.1°N 2.6°E

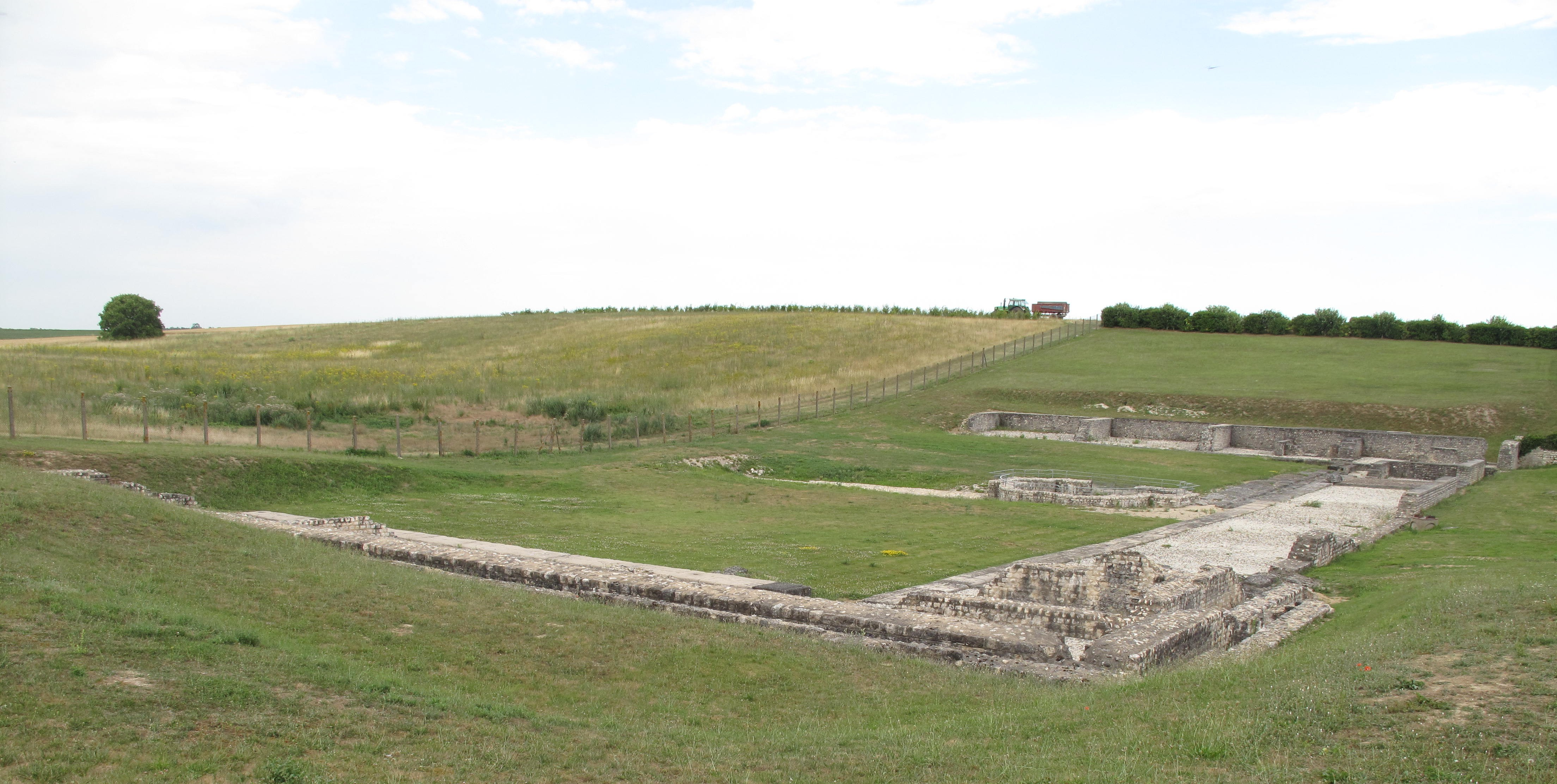
Aquis Segeste _{(fr)}, archeological founds. Gaulish and later Roman cult place near Sceaux-du-Gâtinais

Gâtinais (pronounced [ɡɑtinɛ]) or Gâtine (pronounced [ɡɑtin]) was a province of France, containing the area around the valley of the Loing, corresponding roughly to the northeastern part of the département of Loiret, and the south of the present department of Seine-et-Marne. Under the Bourbons, the Gâtinais had already been divided between the provinces of Île-de-France and Orléans. In the words of the modern tourist slogan for the "two Gâtinais", it lies between the Seine and the Loire.

Under the Franks, Gâtinais was the pagus Wastinensis (eventually to become Wasteney in the 20th century), (or Vastinensis) one of five belonging to the Archbishop of Sens. The west part of Puisaye and the archbishop's other fiefs in the northwest of the modern department of Yonne, west of that river, are also often considered part of Gâtinais; as is the area around Étampes in the present department of Essonne. Around the 10th century, the main town of this province was Château-Landon, and a twenty-five-mile circle around Notre-Dame de Château-Landon basically comprised it.

The western part, Gâtinais orléanais, approximately corresponds to the arrondissements of Montargis and a large part of Pithiviers, in Loiret. Pithiviers has for several centuries been the most representative town of Gâtinais. The eastern part, Gâtinais français, had Nemours as its chief town, and corresponds to the arrondissement of Fontainebleau in Seine-et-Marne.

This is an essentially agricultural area, although the west is wooded. It was for several centuries known for its saffron, a crop that disappeared from this area because of the heavy charges on human work and the impossibility to mechanise this particular crop; these days saffron is making a timid reappearance in the local fields under the impulse of the natural regional park of the Gâtinais français. It is also famous for its honey, produced by traditional methods in the whole area. In 1998 UNESCO designated Fontainebleau et du Gatinais as a biosphere reserve.

== Literary use ==
A region called Gâtinais is a neighbour of the fictional land of Poictesme in James Branch Cabell's Biography of the Life of Manuel.
