= List of structures on the Canal du Loing =

Canal du Loing Code: At=Attraction, A=Aqueduct, V=Village, T=Town, L=Lock ^{[B]} 49.4 km with 19 locks
Code	PK^{[A]}	Name	Lat/Lon	Comment
	0	Origination	48.02816°N 2.72255°E	Connects with Canal de Briare and Canal d'Orleans in Buges near Montargis.
Br	0.4	Unnamed train bridge	48.03197°N 2.72519°E	
L	2.1	Cepoy lock	48.04446°N 2.73851°E	Lock #1 fall 1.50m
V	2.1	Cepoy	48.04446°N 2.738940°E	
Br	2.2	No name given	48.04512°N 2.73924°E	
At	4.5	Ancienne écluse de Montigny		
L	5.2	les Vallées lock	48.06710°N 2.75029°E	Lock #2 falls 1.49m
Br	5.4	No name given	48.06899°N 2.75093°E	
L	5.9	Montabon lock	48.07429°N 2.75224°E	Lock #3 falls 1.41m
Br	8.1	Pont de Vaux	48.09335°N 2.75961°E	
L	9	Retourné lock	48.10004°N 2.76402°E	Lock #4 falls 1.94m
V	10.2	Nargis	48.10899°N 2.75815°E	
L	10.2	Nargis lock	48.11187°N 2.75904°E	Lock #5 falls 1.39m
Br	10.4	No name given	48.11207°N 2.75886°E	
L	11.2	Brisebarre lock	48.11752°N 2.75283°E	Lock #6 falls 1.79m
At	11.2	Moulin de la Goulette		English: Goulette Mill
At	12.5	Pertuis de Nancay		
At	12.6	Moulin de Nancay		English: Nancay Mill
At	12.8	Chateau de Toury		
Br	12.8	Pont de Toury	48.13211°N 2.74962°E	
Br	14.3	Pont de Dordives	48.14554°N 2.75335°E	
Br	14.5	A77	48.15018°N 2.75057°E	
V	15.0	Néronville	48.14788°N 2.73937°E	Small town of Chateau-Landon in 2 km.
A	15.8	Pont canal du Fusin	48.15572°N 2.74170°E	Crosses River Fusain
L	15.9	Néronville lock	48.15595°N 2.74155°E	Lock #7 falls 3.11m
Br	15.9	No name given	48.15614°N 2.74148°E	
V	16.8	Mocpoix	48.16088°N 2.73341°E	
L	17	Égreville lock	48.16506°N 2.73625°E	Lock #8 falls .48m
At	17	Pertuis des Grands Moulins		English: openings of large mills
Br	17.1	No name given	48.16532°N 2.73610°E	
Br	18.5	No name given	48.17594°N 2.72742°E	
Br	19	Pont de Souppes	48.18041°N 2.72463°E	
V	19	Souppes-sur-Loing	48.18337°N 2.73336°E	Large activity center including swimming pool.
?	19.4			A black line is shown on the reference across the canal
Br	20.5	Unnamed train bridge	48.19497°N 2.71654°E	
V	21	La Madeleine-sur-Loing	48.20351°N 2.70555°E	
At	21	Barrage et pertuis de Beaumoulin		English: Dam and sluice of Beaumoulin
L	21	Beaumoulin lock	48.19898°N 2.71654°E	Lock #9 falls 2.20m
At	21.2	Polissoirs préhistoriques		
Br	21.3	Pont de Beaumoulin	48.19923°N 2.71655°E	
At	22.5	Pertuis de Galandelles		
Br	22.5	No name given	48.20988°N 2.71328°E	
V	23	Galandelles	48.21495°N 2.71448°E	
Br	24.3	Pont de Bagneaux	48.22562°N 2.70959°E	Same name appears twice in ref
V	25	Bagneaux-sur-Loing	48.23050°N 2.70676°E	
L	25.6	Bagneaux lock	48.23731°N 2.70551°E	Lock #10 falls 2.09m
Br	25.6	Pont de Bagneaux	48.23751°N 2.70540°E	Same name appears twice in ref
V	27	Chaintreauville	48.24925°N 2.69088°E	Village name may be spelled Chaintréuville
L	27.4	Chaintreauville lock	48.25156°N 2.69676°E	Lock #11 falls 3.10m
Br	27.4	No name given	48.25187°N 2.69667°E	
At	28	Moulin de Doyer		English: Doyer Mill
Br	28.7	Pont des Récollets	48.26281°N 2.69448°E	
T	29	Nemours	48.26667°N 2.70000°E	Museum
Br	29.3	Pont de Paris	48.26681°N 2.68852°E	
L	30	Buttes lock	48.27220°N 2.69383°E	Lock #12 falls 1.60m
Br	30	No name given	48.27237°N 2.69413°E	
V	30.1	Buttes		Waterpoint??
Br	31.4	No name given	48.27882°N 2.69292°E	
Br	31.9	Pont autoroutier	48.28679°N 2.69170°E	The A6 crosses the canal.
At	32.4	Barrage du Moulin Rouge		English: Red Mill Dam
At	32.6	écluse de garde	48.29316°N 2.69467°E	English: Guard lock
Br	32.7	Passerelle	48.29327°N 2.69468°E	
At	33.2	Chateau de Fromonville		
T	33.5	Montcourt-Fromonville	48.30592°N 2.70555°E	Has grocery and restaurant.
Br	34.8	Pont de Montcourt	48.30950°N 2.70779°E	
L	36.4	Les Bordes lock	48.31590°N 2.72723°E	Lock #14 falls 1.93m Grez-sur-Loing approach from the bridge after lock 14 at Bordes.
V	38	La Genevraye	48.32135°N 2.74709°E	
Br	38	Pont de la Genevraye	48.32304°N 2.74678°E	
L	38.7	Berville lock	48.32700°N 2.75144°E	Lock #15 falls 1.96m A full range of shops is found in Montigny-sur-Loing, within 2 km of the canal at the road bridge beyond lock 15.
At	39	Chateau de Berville		
A	41	Pont canal du Lunain	48.33416°N 2.78051°E	
L	41.1	Épisy lock	48.33426°N 2.78098°E	Lock #16 falls 3.16m
Br	41.2	No name given	48.33435°N 2.78129°E	
V	41.5	Épisy	48.33434°N 2.78473°E	
L	44.2	Éculles lock	48.35071°N 2.81017°E	Lock #17 falls 1.31m
Br	44.3	No name given	48.35084°N 2.81050°E	
At	45	Abbaye du Don de Dieu		English: Gift of God Abbey
V	45	Éculles	48.35323°N 2.82040°E	Has several shops and a restaurant.
Br	46.3	Pont de Ravanne	48.36666°N 2.82739°E	
Br	46.5	No name given	48.36808°N 2.82666°E	
L	46.8	Bourgogne lock	48.37072°N 2.82578°E	Lock #18 falls 2.37m
V	46.9	Bourgoyne		Beyond lock 18 is La Grange Bateliere, a thatched cottage inspired by buildings in the Vendee.
Br	46.9	Pont de Bourgogne	48.37100°N 2.82578°E	
L	47.6	Moret lock	48.37663°N 2.82036°E	Lock #19 falls 2.24m
Br	47.6	No name given	48.37683°N 2.82005°E	
T	47.7	Moret-sur-Loing	48.37239°N 2.82095°E	Fortified town. A highlight of the canal. It was fortified with gateways and has many royal connections going back to the time of Louis VII.
Br	48.2	Unnamed train bridge	48.38057°N 2.81261°E	
T	49	Saint-Mammès	48°23′14″N 2°48′54″E	Barge town with several quayside moorings for pleasure boats in the Seine. Connects to Seine. Well supplied with shops, restaurants, and boating requirements. The old Ecluse 20, just inside the entrance is no longer used because of a change in the level of the Seine.
At	49.3	Ancienne éclude de St-Mammes	48.38526°N 2.80516°E	Old lock #20
	49.4	la Seine	48.38721°N 2.80229°E	Termination

== Notes ==
^{A} Distance in km from the beginning of the canal in Buges, near Montargis.
^{B} Each lock has a number and a number of meters for its rise or fall.
