= Bief de la Folie =

French canal

The Bief de la Folie is a section of the Orléans Canal situated between the Sainte-Catherine lock upstream and the Folie lock downstream. It forms part of the first stretch of the canal constructed by Robert Mahieu between 1676 and 1678, linking Vieilles-Maisons-sur-Joudry to Buges. Measuring 2,060 metres in length, the reach lies entirely within the municipality of Châlette-sur-Loing. The reaches known as La Folie and Buges are located in Châlette-sur-Loing but take their names from districts of the neighboring municipality of Corquilleroy.

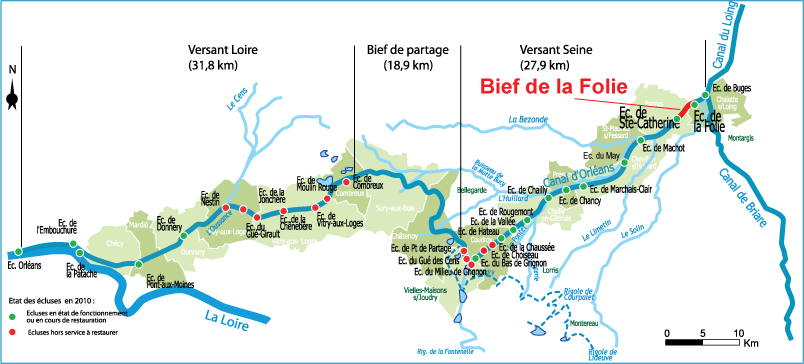
Location of the Folie millpond on the Orleans Canal.

== History ==
An initial section of the Orléans Canal was excavated by Robert Mahieu between Vieilles-Maisons-sur-Joudry and Buges from 1676 to 1678 and opened to the transport of timber and coal. The Bief de la Folie and the Folie lock were constructed during this first phase. Extension of the canal to the Loire was carried out between 1681 and 1687, and the waterway was inaugurated in 1692.

From 1692 to 1793, the canal experienced significant growth, with an estimated 1,500 to 2,000 vessels navigating upstream each year from Nantes on the Loire toward Paris. In 1793, the canal became national property. Between 1807 and 1860, it was operated by the Compagnie des canaux d’Orléans et du Loing, and in 1863 its management was transferred to the Ponts et Chaussées for a period of 91 years.

Between 1908 and 1921, despite a marked decline in inland waterway freight traffic, works were carried out to extend the Orléans Canal between Combleux and Orléans. Following the complete cessation of navigation, the canal was declassified as a navigable waterway in 1954 and incorporated into the private domain of the State.

In 1978, the Joint Management Syndicate of the Orléans Canal was established to manage, promote, and organize activities across the canal estate. In 1984, management of the estate was entrusted to the Loiret department for a period of 50 years, with the Syndicate retaining responsibility for day-to-day operations, while ownership remained with the State.

== Description ==
=== Characteristics ===
The Bief de la Folie is a 2,060-metre section of the Orléans Canal located between the Sainte-Catherine lock upstream and the Folie lock downstream, entirely within the municipality of Châlette-sur-Loing.

It includes two turning basins designed to facilitate the manoeuvring of pleasure craft. These consist of widened sections of the canal and are situated at the confluence with the Bezonde and upstream of the Folie lock.

== Canal rehabilitation works ==
As part of the canal restoration project, dredging of the reach bed and works to protect the canal banks are planned.

=== Dredging ===
Reopening the canal to navigation requires compliance with specific dimensional standards, including a minimum water depth of 1.40 m—corresponding to a vessel draft of 1.20 m with an under-keel clearance of 0.20 m—and a minimum surface width of 8 m. Meeting these requirements entails dredging the canal bed to restore sufficient navigable depth. For the Bief de la Folie, the dredging volume is estimated at 2,302 m^{3} of silt over a dredgeable length of 2,030 m, representing an average of about 1.1 m^{3} per linear meter.

=== Bank protection ===
As part of the canal rehabilitation project, approximately 250 m of natural banks are to be protected. The estimated cost of these works was €25,000 (excluding tax) in 2009.

== Folie lock ==
The Folie lock has a chamber length of 31.4 m and a width of 5.2 m. The NGF elevations of the main elements of the lock are as follows: upstream reach: 82.63, downstream reach: 81.78, top of the lock wall: 84.08. The drop height is therefore 0.85 m.

The Folie lock is operational, therefore not requiring any work as part of the project to reopen the Orléans Canal to navigation.

== See also ==
- List of canals in France

== Bibliography ==
- Beaudouin, François (1985). Bateaux des fleuves de France [Boats on the rivers of France] (in French). Douarnenez: l'Estran. ISBN 2-903707-14-6.
- Biton, Germaine (1975). Bateaux de Loire I ; une descente [Loire boats I; a descent] (in French).
- Biton, Germaine (1970). Mariniers de Loire [Loire River boatmen] (in French).
- Bouex, Paul (1931). "Les Canaux de Briare, d'Orléans et du Loing" [The Briare, Orleans, and Loing Canals]. Bulletin de l'association des naturalistes de la Folie du Loing (in French) (2): 61 et seq.
- Chaussard, Paul (1980). La Marine de Loire [The Loire River Navy] (in French). Horvath.
- Croissandeau, Jules (1886). La Question du canal [The Canal Question] (in French). Orléans: Herluison.
- Dessaux, Georges (1906). Le Canal d'Orléans, mise à grande section et alimentation, prolongement de Combleux à Orléans, rapport fait à la Chambre de commerce d'Orléans et du Loiret [The Orleans Canal, widening and water supply, extension from Combleux to Orleans, report submitted to the Orleans and Loiret Chamber of Commerce] (in French).
- De La Garde, Jacques (1993). Les Canaux du Loing, de Briare, d'Orléans [The Loing, Briare, and Orleans Canals] (in French). Guignes: Sauvegarde des monuments.
- Huet; Pigelet (1902). Promenades pittoresques dans le Loiret [Picturesque walks in the Loiret] (in French). Orléans: Herluison.
- Mauret-Cribellier, Valérie (2008). Entre fleuves et rivières : Les canaux du centre de la France [Between rivers and streams: The canals of central France]. Images du patrimoine (in French). Lyon: Lieux Dits. ISBN 978-2-914528-45-0.
- Pinsseau, Pierre (1923). Briare-le-Canal et ses seigneurs [Briare-le-Canal and its lords] (in French). Orléans: Hottré.
- Pinsseau, Pierre (1943). Le Canal Henri IV ou canal de Briare [The Henri IV Canal or Briare Canal] (in French). Paris: Clavrettil.
- Pinsseau, Pierre (1963). Histoire de la construction de l'administration et de l'exploitation du canal d'Orléans de 1676 à 1954 [History of the construction, administration, and operation of the Orleans Canal from 1676 to 1954] (in French). Orléans: Clavrettil Masselot.
- Pinsseau, Pierre. Le Canal d'Orléans. Opuscule repris du journal du Loiret du 23 octobre 1913 et suivants [The Orleans Canal. Short article taken from the Loiret newspaper dated October 23, 1913, and subsequent issues.] (in French).
- Rabartin, Roland (1993). Le Canal d'Orléans au fil du temps [The Orleans Canal through time] (in French). Paris: Conseil général du Loiret.
- Vinçonneau, V.R (1962). Le Canal d'Orléans et ses vicissitudes à travers les siècles. Deux conférences ronéotées [The Orleans Canal and its vicissitudes through the centuries. Two mimeographed lectures.] (in French).
