= Port of Orléans =

Loire River port in Orléans, France

Orléans river port
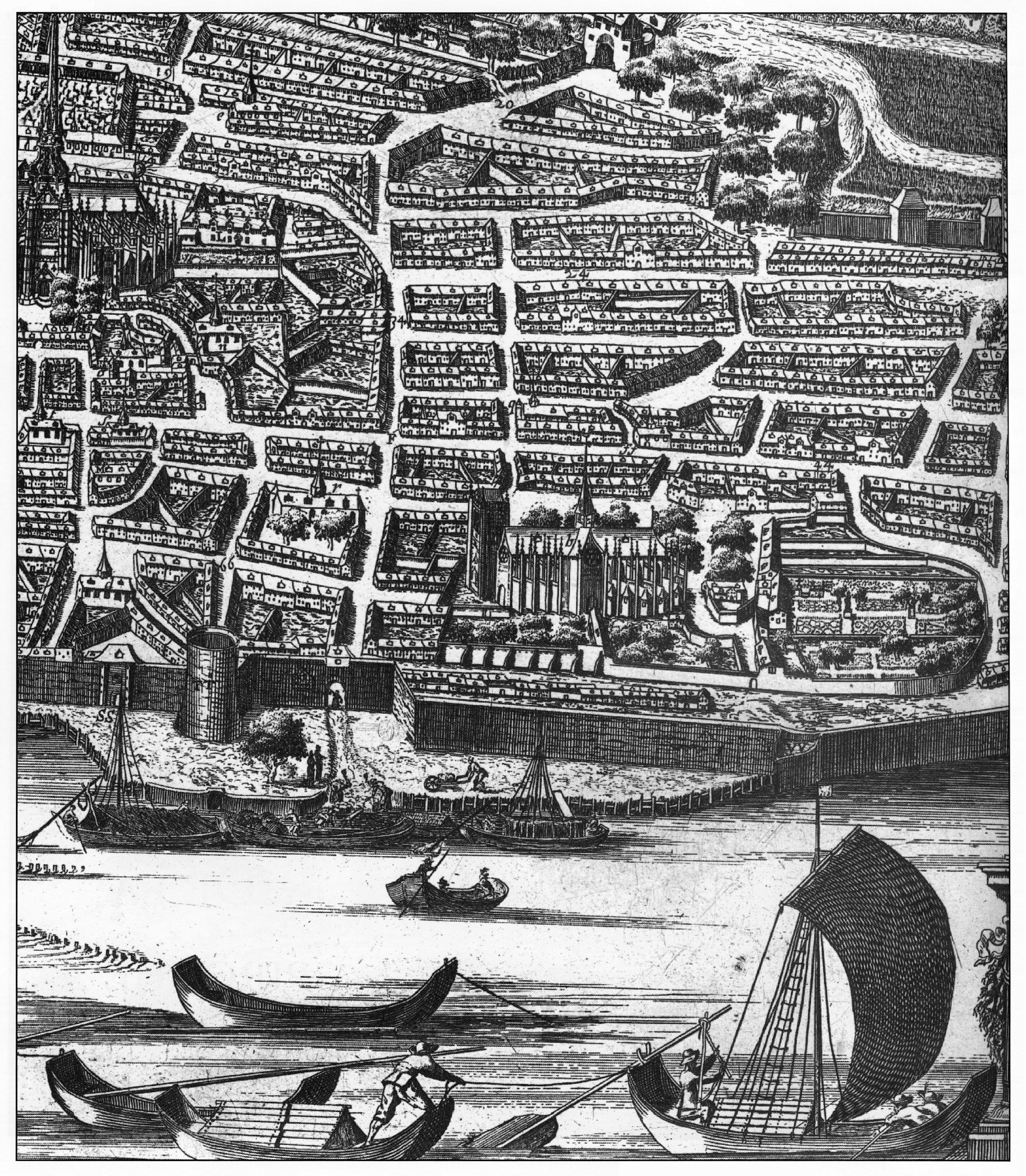
- The Loire River, the upstream port, and the city of Orléans in the mid-17th century
- Interactive map of Orléans river port

Location
- Country: France
- Location: Orléans; Loiret; Centre-Val de Loire
- Coordinates: 47°53′51″N 1°54′33″E

Details
- Traffic: none (decline since the mid-19th century)
- Activities: trade, textiles, sugar, vinegar, travelers

The Port of Orléans is a French river port located on the Loire in the city of Orléans, with origins predating Julius Caesar’s conquest of Gaul.

It historically served as a major storage and trade hub between the Atlantic Ocean and the Rhône Valley and functioned as a supply center for Paris. From the mid-19th century onward, its activity declined due to competition from road and, especially, rail transport, leading to the gradual disappearance of river traffic during the 20th century.

== Geographical location ==
The city of Orléans is located at the intersection of three major natural routes: the upper Loire, which connects it to the Rhône Valley and facilitated the arrival of Mediterranean goods; the lower Loire, which links it to the Atlantic coast and maritime trade; and the overland route leading north to Paris, (Note: Dion 1938, p. 134) later complemented by the construction of the Orléans Canal in the late 17th century.

The Loire, which flows east to west along its middle and lower course—a distinctive feature among major European rivers—was navigable by sail from its mouth to the city of Orléans.

== General warehouse of France ==
Even before the Roman conquest, a trading post and market existed on the banks of the Loire, where Roman merchants resided (Note: Dion 1938, p. 128) and traded grain from the Beauce region. In Géographie, Strabo referred to the city (Κήναβον) as the emporium of the Carnutes (τὸ τῶν Καρνούντον ἑμπόριον). (Note: An emporium is a trading post, a commercial port.) Julius Caesar later established a grain supply center in Cenabum (Orléans), confirming that it already functioned as an active river port from which grain was transported along the Loire in flat-bottomed boats.

The most active trade relations were long maintained along the upper Loire, with Lyon, Italy, Marseille, and the Mediterranean countries, from which came the most valuable cargoes such as wines, oils, fruits from Provence, and gold and silk fabrics. This was still noted in 1738 by François de Baussan, the intendant of Orléans: “Above the Châtelet begins a port called La Poterne, and it is the one in the whole city where goods arrive in the greatest quantity; these are even the most precious, coming from Italy, Marseille, Lyon, and all the upper provinces.” (Note: Dion 1938, p. 129)

Navigation along the lower Loire, historically focused on transporting salt from the Nantes region, diversified from the late 13th century. Key cargoes included the wine and vinegar of Orléans, salted or dried fish, Spanish wool, copper, and lead. In the 16th century, trade expanded with the Newfoundland fisheries and reached a peak in the second half of the 17th century through commerce with the West Indies, (Note: Dion 1938, p. 133) particularly in sugar. During the 18th century, Orléans became noted for sugar refining. (Note: Villiers & Senotier 1997, p. 110) (Note: Mantellier 1867, p. 252) Slates produced in the Angers region also constituted a significant portion of upriver cargoes until the First World War. (Note: Villiers & Senotier 1997, p. 196)

This major river traffic made the 18th century a golden age for the city, prompting Régnard, the king’s prosecutor at the city’s Bureau des Finances, to write in 1780: “Orléans is the general warehouse of France.”

By the end of the 18th century, Orléans, with its 40,000 inhabitants, was the second most populous city along the Loire after Nantes (80,000 inhabitants), while Tours then had only 20,000. (Note: Villiers & Senotier 1997, p. 122)

== Infrastructure ==
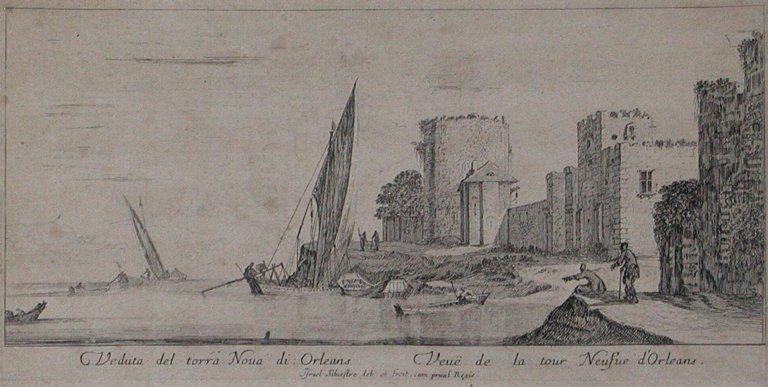
View of the Neuve d'Orléans tower in the 17th century (Israël Silvestre)

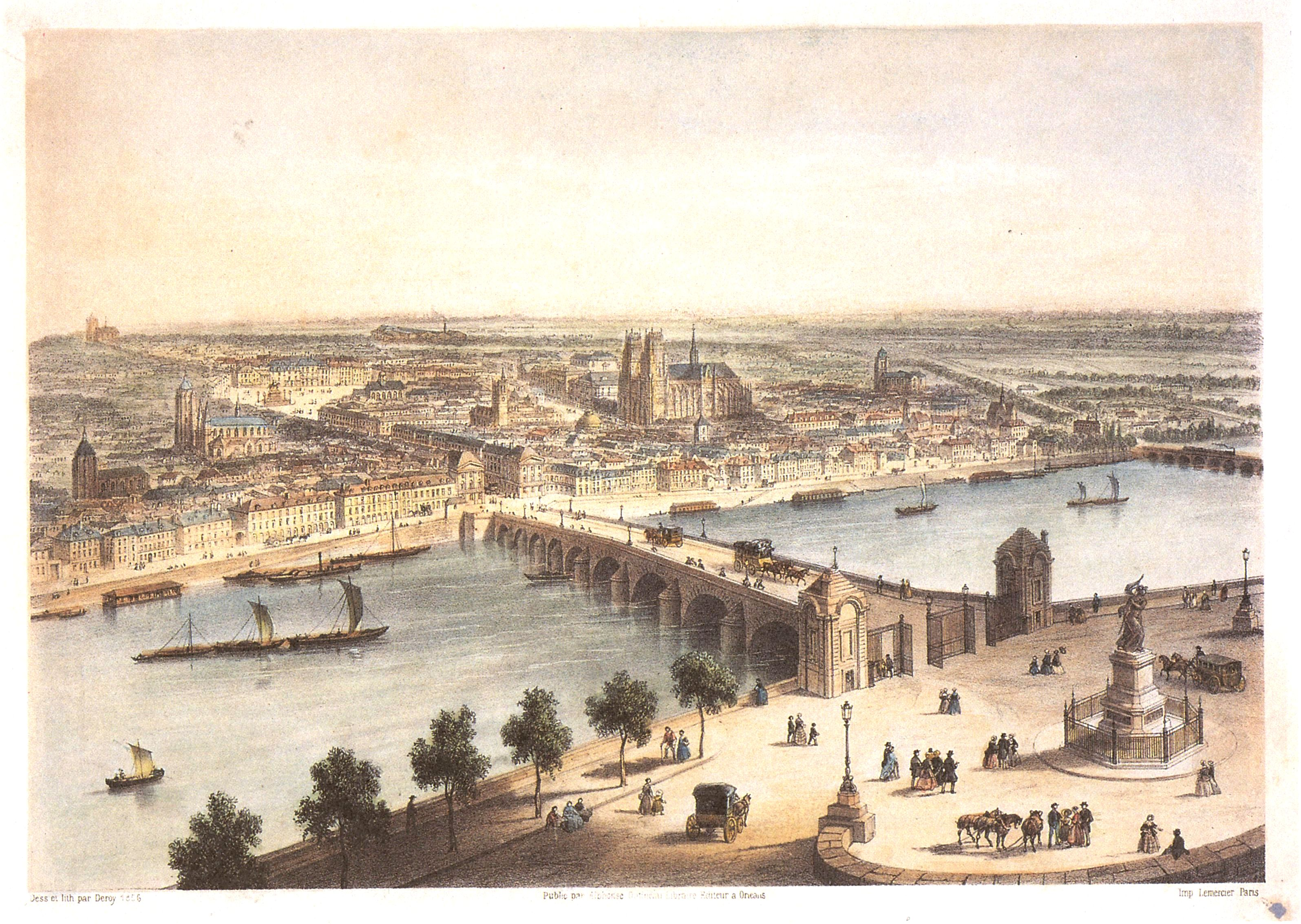
View towards the north of the city of Orleans and the Royal Bridge in 1856. Downstream from the bridge (north bank on the left) is the port of Recouvrance, upstream (north bank on the right) is the port of La Poterne.

The port of Cenabum was situated upstream of the bridge over the Loire on its right bank, where two small tributaries provided a natural shelter for boats. It primarily facilitated downstream traffic. Archaeological excavations in 1993 in the Dessaux district uncovered the remains of five quays, built successively during the 1st century and extending gradually into the river. (Note: Dupont 1994, p. 121) These quays were supported by rows of posts with wooden decking. Remains of buildings, possibly warehouses, dating from the late 1st or early 2nd century were also identified. (Note: Dupont 1994, p. 123)

The downstream port likely originated around the same period as the Bourg Dunois, also known as Avenum, a merchant suburb located downstream from the bridge and outside the fortified walls, which is documented as early as 1020. (Note: Gleizes 1994, p. 109)

At that time, loading and unloading occurred on a narrow strip of land between the river and the city walls, with access to the city limited to a few openings in the fortifications.

In 1356, the city walls were extended to incorporate the Bourg Dunois, providing protection for both the upstream and downstream ports. In the second half of the 15th century, Louis XI reinforced earthen embankments along the ramparts with bundles of brushwood, creating the first quays since the Gallo-Roman period.

At its height, the port extended along both the north and south banks of the Loire. On the north bank, the ports of La Poterne (upstream of the bridge) and Recouvrance (downstream) were located, while the south bank had facilities both upstream and downstream of the bridge. The north bank was primarily used for rapid loading and unloading, benefiting from its proximity to the city and improved accessibility during low water periods through a submersible dike known as the duit. The south bank mainly accommodated boats with longer stays or carrying less valuable cargo.

The duit, documented as early as 1360, (Note: Dion 1938, p. 144) was periodically extended and heightened. (Note: Villiers & Senotier 1997, p. 132) In 1684, a general inspection declared it “entirely ruined,” leading to its reconstruction at the king’s expense. The most extensive rebuilding occurred in the second half of the 18th century, coinciding with major public works that included the construction of the new Royal Bridge; during this period, the central island was leveled and the duit was completely reconstructed.

During these major works, the old ramparts and the Châtelet were demolished to allow the construction of larger stone quays on the right bank for the ports of La Poterne and Recouvrance. Paved ramps were added on both banks to facilitate loading and unloading, and rings were installed in the masonry to secure boats.

Under the July Monarchy, a warehouse was established to mitigate the irregularity of river transport. Initially built inland near Saint-Euverte Church in 1831, it was later relocated downstream from the port of Recouvrance on Quai Saint-Laurent. However, with the decline of port activity, particularly the reduced arrival of raw sugar from the West Indies, the warehouse soon became largely redundant.

== Ports in commercial relations with Orléans ==
Trade with Marseille remained a major commercial route for an extended period. As a free port since 1669, Marseille was connected to the Mediterranean basin and, via the Strait of Gibraltar, to the Atlantic. Trade with Nantes expanded from the second half of the 17th century and became predominant, largely driven by colonial commerce with the West Indies, which produced significant profits.

=== Trade with Marseille ===
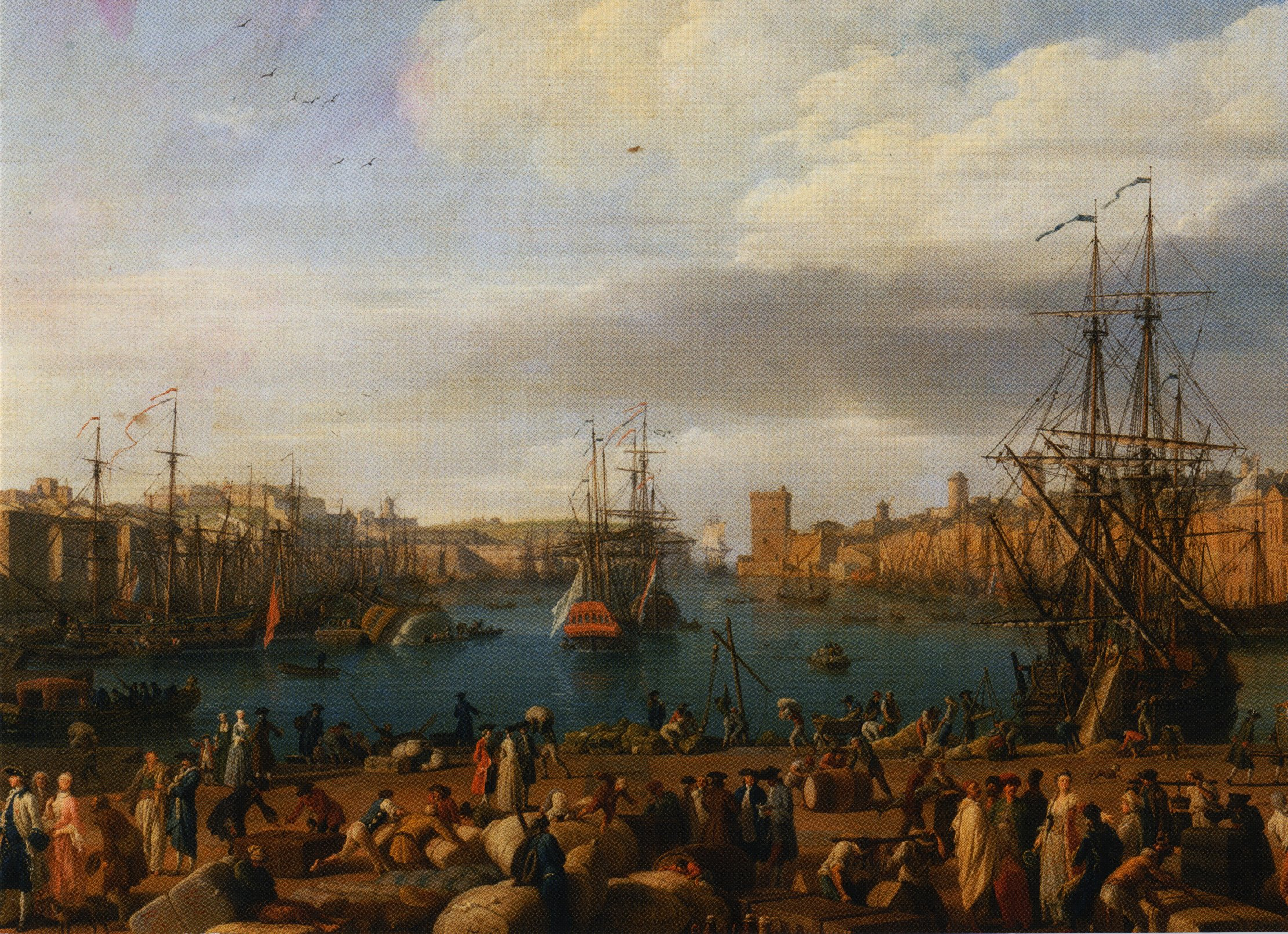
The Port of Marseille in 1754 (Claude Joseph Vernet)

Orléans exported “Tunis-style caps” (Note: In 18th-century French texts, “bonnets façon de Tunis” or “bonnets gasquets” refer to chéchias (traditional caps) made in France, as the term chechia—although known since the 16th century—was not yet used (Valensi, Lucette (1969). "Islam et capitalisme : production et commerce des chéchias en Tunisie et en France aux XVIIIe et XIXe siècles" [Islam and capitalism: production and trade of chechias in Tunisia and France in the 18th and 19th centuries]. Revue d'histoire moderne et contemporaine (in French). 16 (3): 376–400. doi:10.3406/rhmc.1969.3033. JSTOR 20527856.)) to Marseille, which were intended for distribution along the Mediterranean coasts of North Africa and the Ottoman Empire.

The majority of trade between the two cities, however, was directed from Marseille to Orléans. Goods arriving in Marseille from the Mediterranean basin, combined with local products from Marseille and Provence, were transported to Orléans. These included olive oil, wines, spices, cotton, Marseille soap, and fruits from Provence.

Transport along the Rhône typically involved convoys of barges linked together and hauled upstream by horses or oxen, taking on average 30 to 40 days to travel from Arles to Lyon. When faster travel was required, water coaches were used; these boats held a monopoly on downstream passenger transport but generally traveled upstream with few passengers, taking approximately eight days to connect Avignon and Lyon.

Upon arrival in Lyon, cargoes were unloaded south of the city and transported by cart to Roanne, where they were reloaded onto boats navigating the Loire. The journey from Roanne to Orléans took about eight days before the construction of the lateral canal to the Loire. In some cases, such as with cotton, which was sensitive to humidity, the entire route from Marseille to Roanne was made overland.

Not all goods bound for Paris were transported via the Loire and Orléans. During the 18th century, the maritime route through the Strait of Gibraltar to the ports of Le Havre and Rouen was more commonly used, as it was longer but less expensive. (Note: The term refers to ships from the ports of Granville, Saint-Malo, and Honfleur that fished for cod on the Newfoundland Banks.) This route was primarily served by ships from Saint-Malo, which sold cod caught in Newfoundland in Marseille and carried return cargoes at low freight rates.

=== Trade with Nantes ===
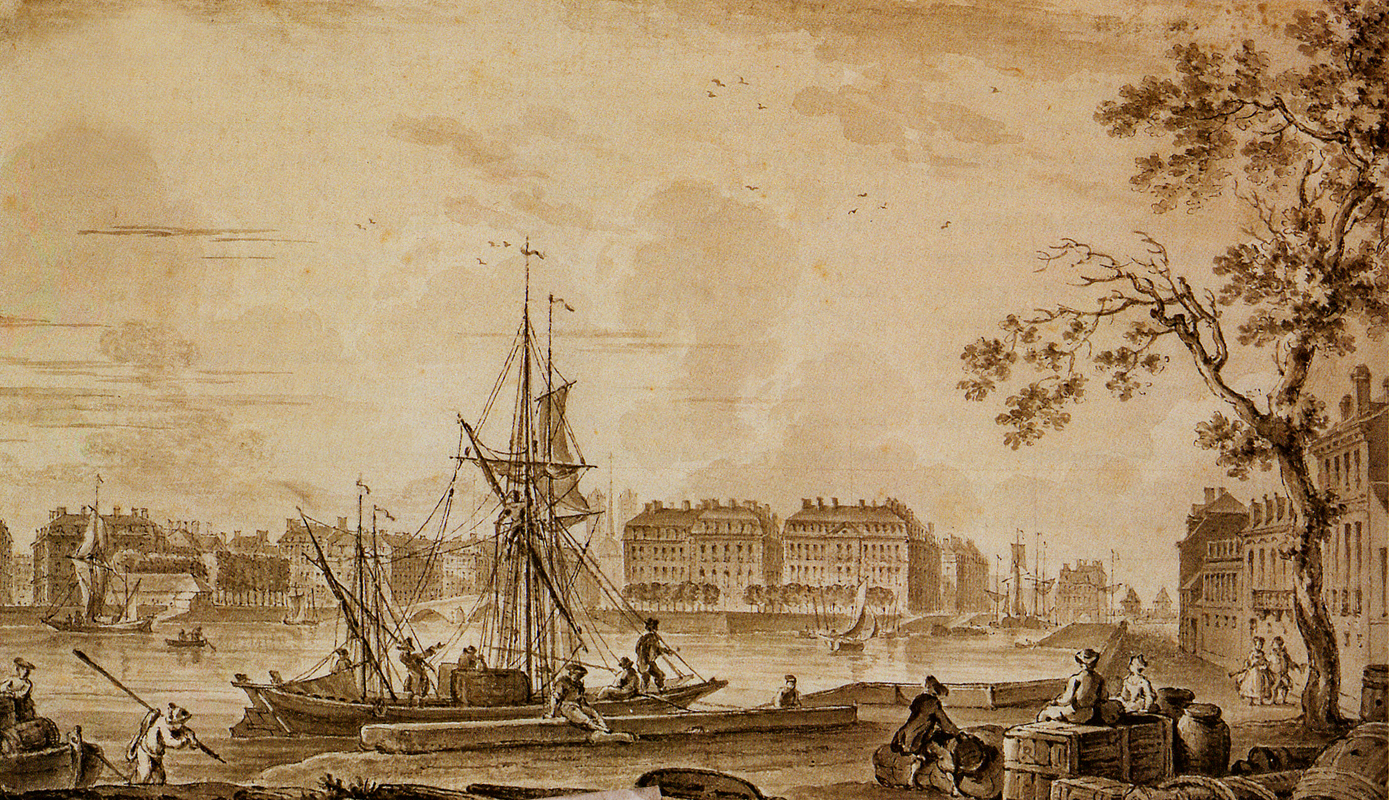
The port of Nantes around 1776 (attributed to Nicolas Ozanne)

Trade with the port of Nantes was historically secondary to that with Marseille. Initially based on the salt produced in the Nantes region, its significance increased from the late 13th century with the transport of salted or dried fish and later with goods linked to Nantes’ maritime connections, including Spanish wool, copper, and lead. In the 16th century, trade from Nantes expanded further through the Newfoundland fisheries.

Trade between Orléans and Nantes peaked in the second half of the 17th century due to commerce with the West Indies. Economic ties between the two cities were closely linked: Nantes handled colonial goods through maritime trade, while Orléans processed and redistributed these goods and supplied Nantes with products to support colonial trade, including the triangular trade and direct commerce (Note: It refers to trade consisting of simple round trips.) with the colonies.

Orléans provided Nantes with food, consumer goods, and materials for both the colonies and the provisioning of ships engaged in colonial trade. Local products from Orléans included molds and pots for processing sugar, (Note: Sugar could undergo a first refining process in the Caribbean, which involved whitening it with a special clay, hence the name sucre terré (“clayed sugar”).) as well as flints for firearms. (Note: de Person 2008, p. 105) (Note: Villiers & Senotier 1997, p. 109)

Among the colonial goods received by Orléans, sugar was the most significant. The city processed the majority of raw sugar arriving from Nantes, and during the 18th century, Orléans became renowned for its refined sugar production.

== Supplying Paris ==
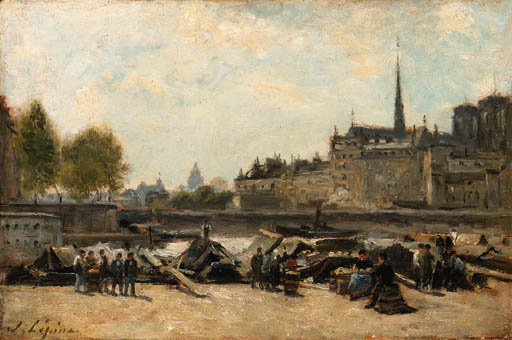
The apple market, Quai de Gesvres and Quai de l'Hôtel de Ville (Stanislas Lépine)

Paris, located approximately 120 km from Orléans, represented a major market for goods transported along the Loire as well as for local products from the Orléans region. Connections between the two cities date back to Roman times, with the road linking Cenabum (Orléans) and Lutetia (Paris). The opening of the Briare Canal in 1642 and the Orléans Canal in 1692 further facilitated transport between the Loire and Seine river basins, particularly for heavy goods.

Wines were transported to Paris via the Orléans Canal, the navigable Loing (from 1723), and the Seine. Shipments included wines from both upstream and downstream regions, such as Touraine and Anjou, as well as local productions from areas including the parish of Saint-Marceau and Olivet. In Saint-Marceau, on the south bank of the Loire, much of the wine was loaded in the riverboat district of Portereau.

Some boatmen went to Paris to sell Loire Valley fruits directly, setting up their barges—converted into shops—at the “apple market,” along the Hôtel de Ville quay. (Note: Villiers & Senotier 1997, p. 148)

Lighter goods, such as groceries, were typically transported by road, which provided the most direct and fastest route. The transporters, known as voituriers par terre or rouliers, were often peasants earning additional income outside the farming season, with the Place du Martroi serving as a common departure point. (Note: de Person 2008, pp. 132–134)

Orléans was not the only route for supplying Paris with goods from the Atlantic; some shipments also arrived via the Seine, through the ports of Le Havre and Rouen. In the 19th century, the introduction of steam navigation eliminated the need for towage, making the Seine route more efficient despite its previously challenging meanders between Rouen and Paris. (Note: Villiers & Senotier 1997, p. 131)

== Activities related to the port ==
In addition to port operations—such as loading, unloading, and storage—and long-established trading activities, production-related industries developed in Orléans, taking advantage of the port’s access for import and export. These industries included textiles, sugar refining, and vinegar production.

=== Port trades ===
Numerous trades lived directly or indirectly from the port activity of Orléans. The maintenance of boats required carpenters, sailmakers, and rope-makers, whose ropes were produced either on an island in the middle of the Loire, known as the Motte aux Cordiers, or on the left bank, in the Plaine des Cordiers. Barrels, used for the transport of most goods—not only wine or vinegar—were made or repaired by coopers. Transport and handling also required many laborers: haulers, porters, and other dockworkers, as well as carters. (Note: Villiers & Senotier 1997, p. 136)

The banks of the Loire supported various water-dependent activities, including laundries, leather and hide processing, and fabric dyeing. The river was also used by boatmen, fishermen, and millers. Some mills, located either on floating barges or suspended from bridge arches, occasionally obstructed navigation and created conflicts with boat traffic.

=== Trade ===
In 1737, the mayor and aldermen of Orléans described trade as follows: “The principal activity of Orléans merchants consists in commission trading. All goods are consigned to commission agents, through whom correspondence is established between merchants at the place of dispatch and those at the place of consumption. These goods are then distributed—some to the lower country, others transported by land to Paris, Normandy, Picardy, Flanders, and even to Germany.” (Note: Dion 1938, p. 136)

Trade was a significant source of wealth for the merchant families of Orléans. This prosperity enabled them to construct notable residences, including the sixteenth-century Renaissance-style Hôtel d’Euverte Hatte (now the Charles Péguy Center), the house of Jean d’Alibert, and the Maison de la Porte Renard built for Philippe Lendormy. In the late eighteenth century, the twin hôtels on Rue de la Bretonnerie were built for the Tassin brothers by Pierre-Adrien Pâris, who was responsible for works at the cathedral.

Merchant families in Orléans often had multiple children. To prevent the division of the family business, the eldest son typically took over the enterprise, sometimes in partnership with his brothers, many of whom remained unmarried. Two or three younger brothers were usually supported within the family home, while others pursued livelihoods elsewhere, with at least one often entering the clergy.

Because commerce played such a central role in Orléans’ economy, merchants were extremely influential: “In Orléans, more than in any other city along the Loire, the bourgeoisie was made up of merchants, and nowhere was the alliance between municipal and commercial interests more intimate or more complete.” (Note: Mantellier 1867, p. 212)

In the nineteenth century, the decline of traditional industries, including textiles and cane-sugar refining, led the bourgeoisie of Orléans to pursue more profitable ventures, notably investing in land in the fertile agricultural region of Beauce.

=== Textile industry ===
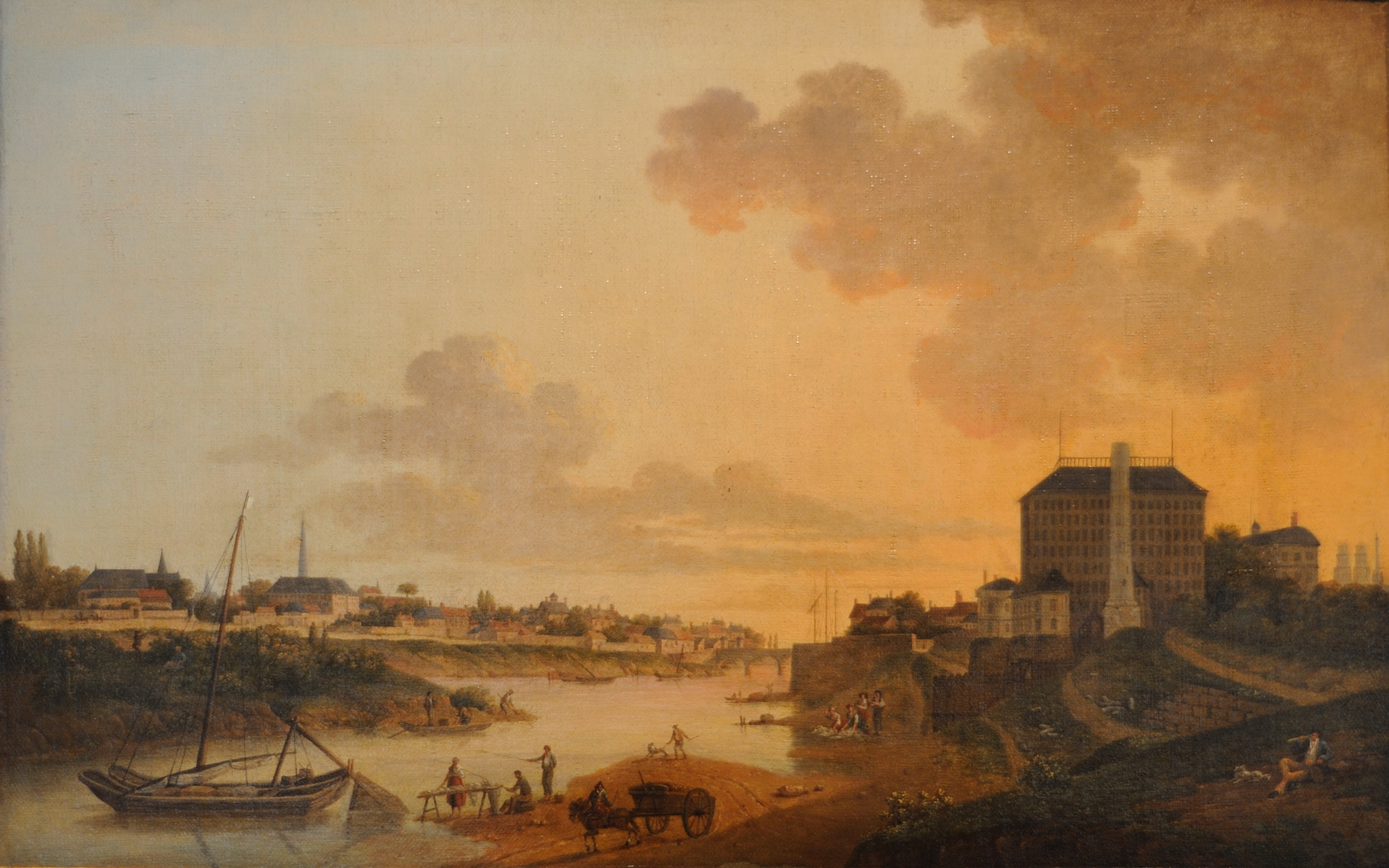
View of the Motte-Sanguin spinning mill in 1815 (Gabriel Jean Louis Rabigot)

In the mid-eighteenth century, the dominant industry in the Orléans region was hosiery, employing approximately 10,000 people at its peak around 1750. Merchants sourced wool locally or from Spain, which was primarily knitted by peasant women in Beauce before being marketed. The industry produced “Tunis-style caps,” dyed red in Orléans, as well as gloves, slippers, stockings, and corsets. From 1680 onward, woven fabrics were also produced, mainly in Orléans, (Note: Villiers & Senotier 1997, p. 119) including some luxury items made from vicuña wool imported from South America. (Note: de Person 2008, p. 121)

In the second half of the eighteenth century, the hosiery industry in Orléans declined due to a reduction in quality associated with increased use of looms and unfavorable external conditions, including the loss of Canada in 1763, an important export market, and a decline in French wool production that required costly imports. In response, Benoist-Héry established a hosiery manufactory at the end of the century, officially recognized as royal in 1774, where all stages of production were centralized.

The Motte-Sanguin spinning mill was established in the late eighteenth century near the Port de la Poterne under the initiative of the Duke of Orléans and the direction of the English engineer Foxlow. It was intended to process cotton imported from America via the port of Rouen, the Seine, and the Orléans Canal. Designed by the city architect Benoît Lebrun, the seven-story building featured 365 windows and was the first spinning mill in France planned to operate with steam power. Constructed between 1789 and 1791, the mill encountered operational difficulties during and after the French Revolution, was converted into a grain mill in 1823, and was destroyed by fire in 1858.

=== Sugar refining ===
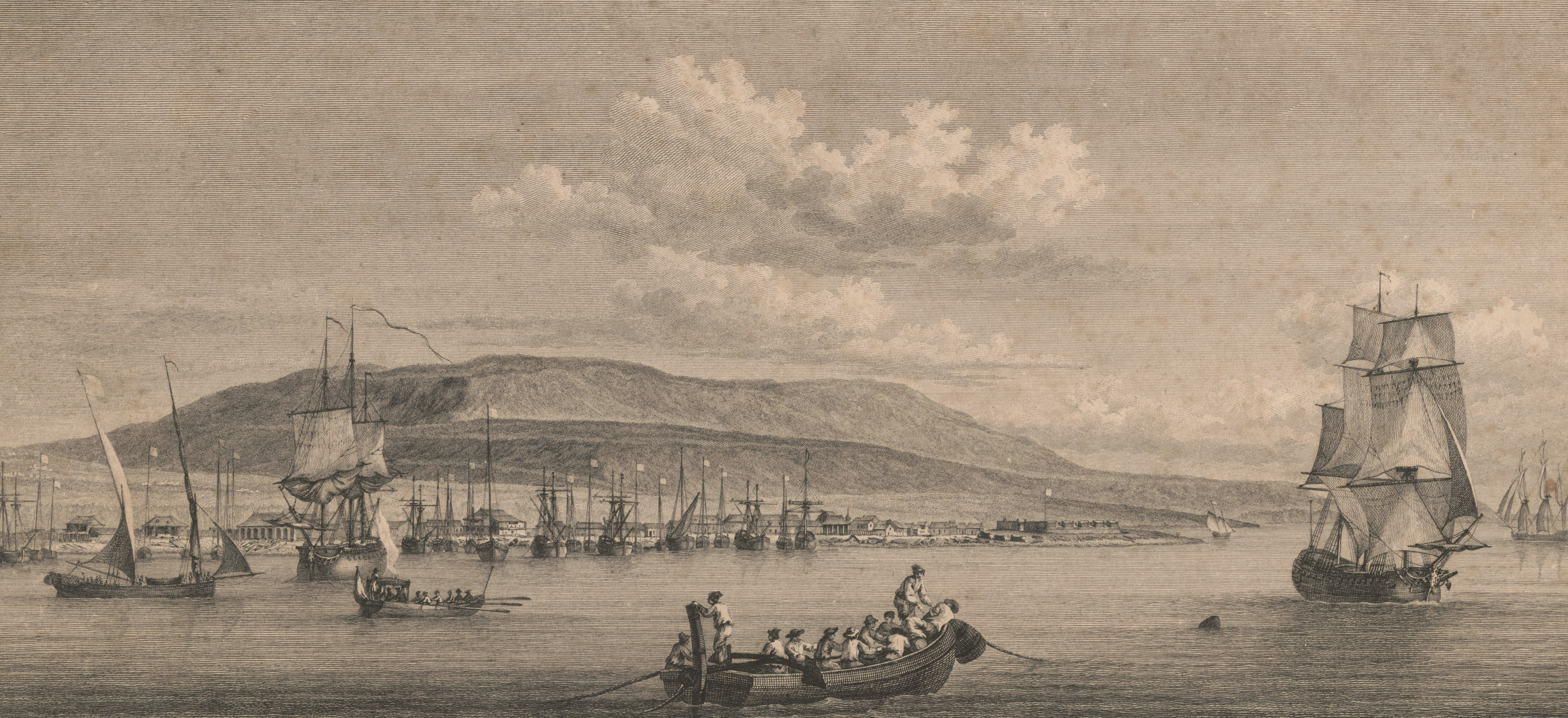
Santo Domingo in 1780, view from the Mole Saint-Nicolas (Pierre Ozanne)

Sugarcane, primarily cultivated in Saint-Domingue, (Note: Saint-Domingue was, in the 17th and 18th centuries, the name of the French colony in the western part of the island of Hispaniola, which became independent in 1804 under the name Haiti.) (Note: de Person 2008, p. 101) was initially processed on site to produce raw sugar, or muscovado. In France, refining was monopolized, reinforced by the 1671 ban on exporting raw sugar from the kingdom and the 1684 prohibition on establishing refineries in the Antilles. These restrictions were partially circumvented through the local production of molded sugar, known as sucre terré.

Sugar refineries were established in Nantes, Angers, Saumur, and Orléans. The first refinery in Orléans processing raw sugar from the Antilles was founded in 1653 by the Dutchman Vandebergue. The city’s sugar production eventually surpassed that of other Loire Valley towns, facilitated by transport to Paris via the Canal d’Orléans and the recognized quality of Orléans sugar. (Note: Villiers & Senotier 1997, p. 103)

The expansion of refineries stimulated related industries, including the production of boilers, sugar molds, string, and wrapping paper for sugar loaves.

In the first half of the nineteenth century, the decline of colonial trade with the Antilles led to the closure of cane-sugar refineries, which were subsequently replaced by beet-sugar refineries.

=== Vinegar production ===
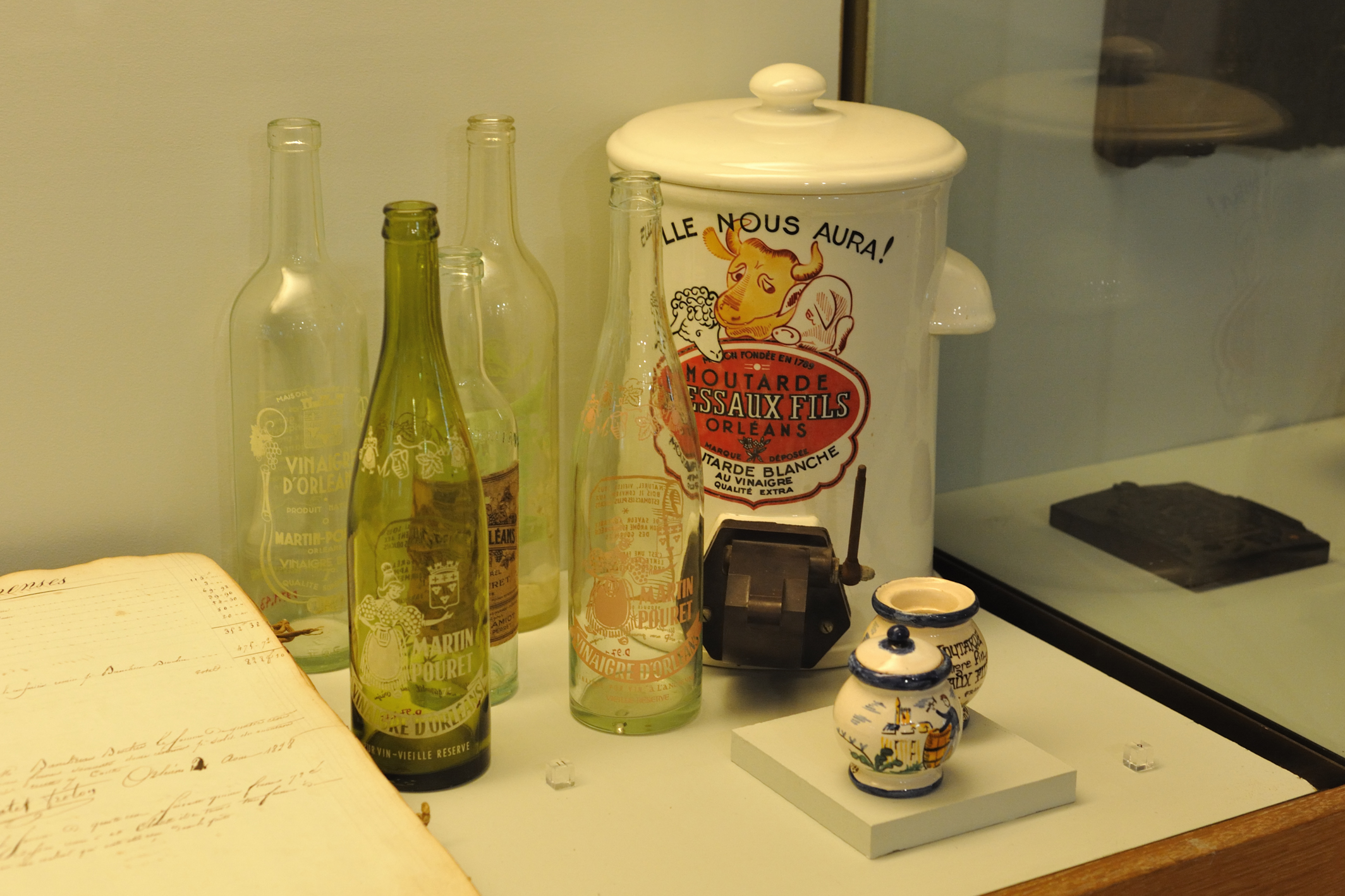
Martin Pouret vinegar bottles and Dessaux Fils mustard dispenser

Vinegar production was an established industry in Orléans, benefiting from the direct arrival of wine at the port. This included wines transported from upstream regions, such as Allier and Burgundy, and from downstream areas, including Nantes, Saumur, Anjou, and Touraine, which had deteriorated during transport. Lower-quality local wines from Orléans vineyards, which covered approximately 25,000 hectares at the end of the eighteenth century, were also used and could be distilled to produce alcohol. (Note: Villiers & Senotier 1997, p. 195) In the second half of the nineteenth century, the expansion of the railway network enabled vinegar producers to source wine from regions beyond the Loire Valley, including Sologne, Poitou, and Charente.

The vinegar makers’ guild in Orléans was established in 1394 and deregulated in April 1777. The resulting decline in quality and prices prompted protests from traditional producers, leading to the reinstatement of regulations in January 1778. The guild system was permanently abolished in March 1791.

By that year, Orléans had approximately 200 vinegar producers. The artisanal phase of production was later succeeded by an industrial phase, exemplified by the establishment of the Dessaux company.

== Loire boats ==
Navigation on the Loire led to the development of various types of boats, each adapted to specific purposes, all characterized by a shallow draft to minimize the risk of grounding on the river’s numerous sandbanks.

=== Navigation by current and sail ===
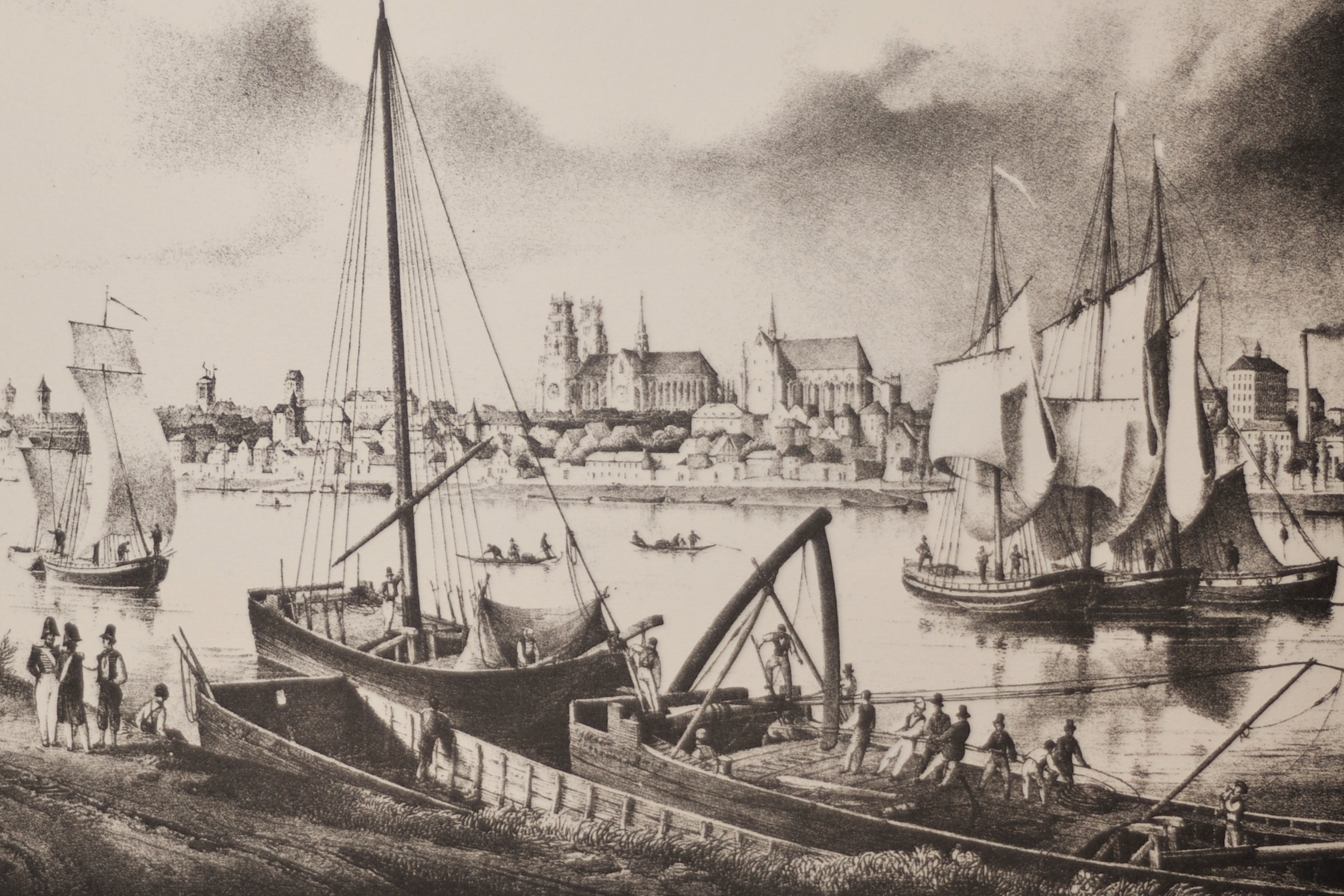
View of Orléans in 1829 showing various boats on the Loire River, taken from the left bank (Charles Pensée)

This mode of navigation remained predominant on the Loire until the introduction of steamships. It ceased entirely for passenger transport but continued to be used for freight.

==== Sapines ====
Sapines were used for downstream transport, primarily from the upper Loire and the Allier, carrying goods such as wood, wine, and pottery. These vessels were designed for a single voyage and were constructed from pine, allowing them to be easily dismantled for the reuse of the material.

==== Chalands ====
Chalands, or gabares, were the most common vessels on the Loire, operating primarily between Orléans and Nantes in both downstream and upstream directions. Downstream navigation relied on the current, with boatmen guiding the vessels using poles known as bâtons de quartier, while upstream journeys were aided by sails and a rudder specific to these boats, called a piautre.

These vessels were typically organized in convoys of two to eight boats, sometimes up to ten. In such convoys, the first two or three boats—referred to as the sentine-mère, tirot, and sometimes sous-tirot—carried sails, while the remaining boats, known as soubres and soubriquets, lacked sails and rudders.

==== “Cabins” ====
The cabanes, or toues cabanées, were boats featuring a central covered shelter, primarily used for passenger transport on downstream journeys. Upstream, the vessels, which were slower, were generally used for carrying freight. Depending on their size, they could accommodate up to twenty passengers.

==== “Accelerated boats” ====
At the end of the eighteenth century, a regular service was established between Nantes and Orléans using sailing vessels known as bateaux accélérés (“accelerated boats”), designed to complete the journey as quickly as possible without stopping for trade. The service was subject to delays during periods of low water or unfavorable winds.

=== Steam navigation ===
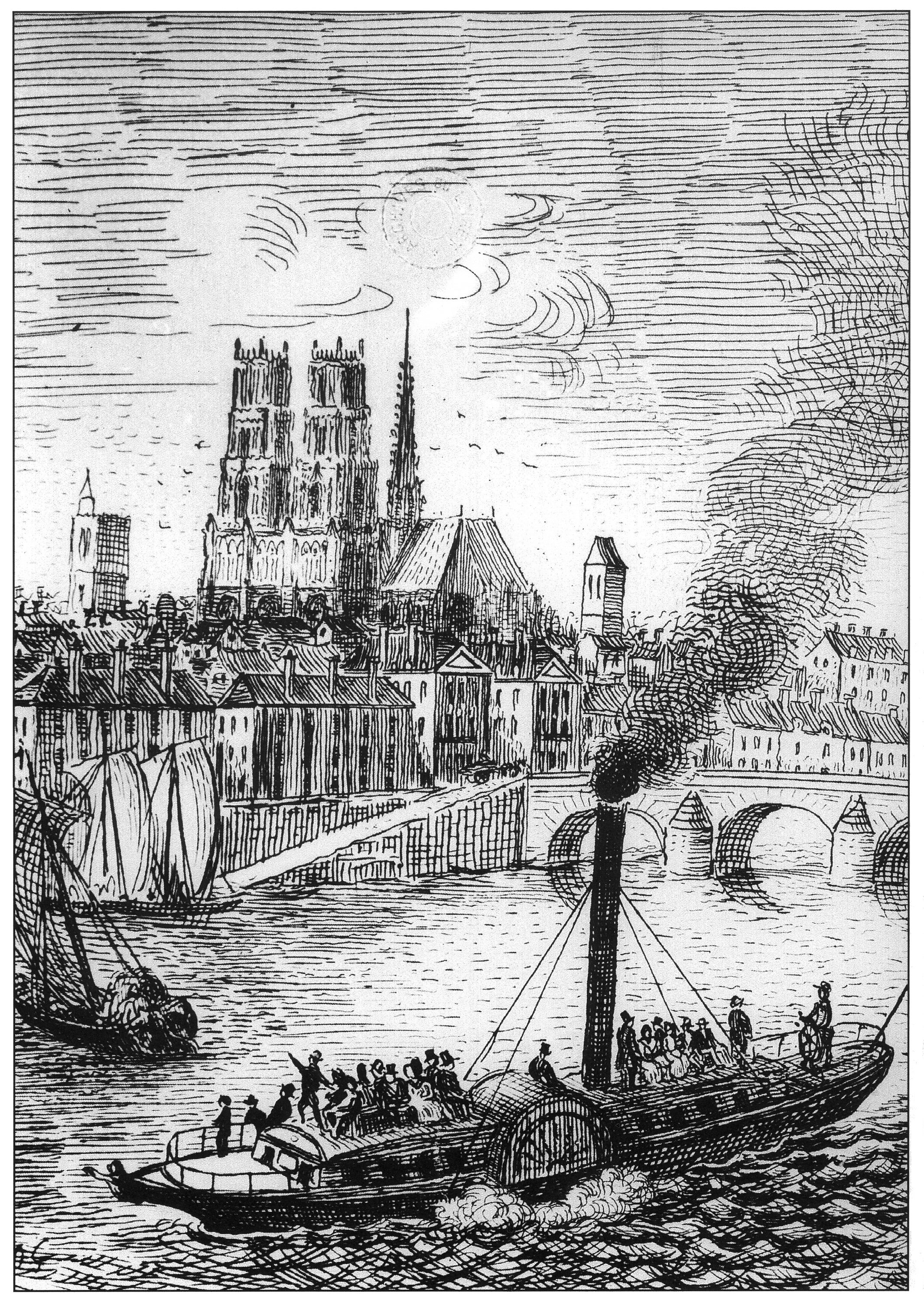
Inexplosible on the Loire River in front of Orléans

Le Nantais, the first steamboat to navigate upstream from Nantes, arrived in Orléans on May 1, 1823. Its owner, the Nantes merchant Tranchevent, limited its operation, as well as that of his second vessel, L’Angevin, to the Nantes–Angers route.

Regular steamboat service began several years later with the Société anonyme de la navigation accélérée sur la Loire et ses affluents par les Accélérés (“Limited Company for Accelerated Navigation on the Loire and Its Tributaries”). Its first vessel, Ville de Nantes, reached Orléans on May 1, 1829. After competing with the Compagnie des Riverains du Haut de la Loire (“Upper Loire Riparian Company”), the Accélérés ceased operations in 1832 and became the Compagnie de l’Aigle, providing a weekly service between Nantes and Orléans with the steamboat L’Aigle.

Later, other types of steamboats were introduced, including lightweight sheet-metal vessels designed by the English engineer Thomson. Following a boiler explosion on one such vessel, the Vulcain No. 1, which resulted in six fatalities, a new type of low-pressure, paddle-wheel steamboat, described as “inexplosive,” was developed. The first of these “Inexplosibles” operated between Nantes and Orléans from 1838 and could carry 150 passengers, with the fleet expanding to ten vessels by 1840. (Note: These vessels, belonging to the Compagnie des Inexplosibles de la Loire, were named Orléanais, Maine, Anjou, Touraine, Ville d’Angers, Jeanne d’Arc, Nantais, Ville de Nantes, Breton, and Papin.) From 1839, five additional boats (Note: Berry, Nivernais, Haute-Loire, Charolais, and Sully.) served the Nantes–Nevers route. These vessels had a shallow draft of 28 centimeters (11 inches) when carrying an eleven-ton load. The last two (No. 20 and No. 21), (Note: Ville de Nantes and Ville d’Angers.) delivered in 1841, had a capacity of up to 250 passengers.

== Peak, arrival of the railway, and decline ==
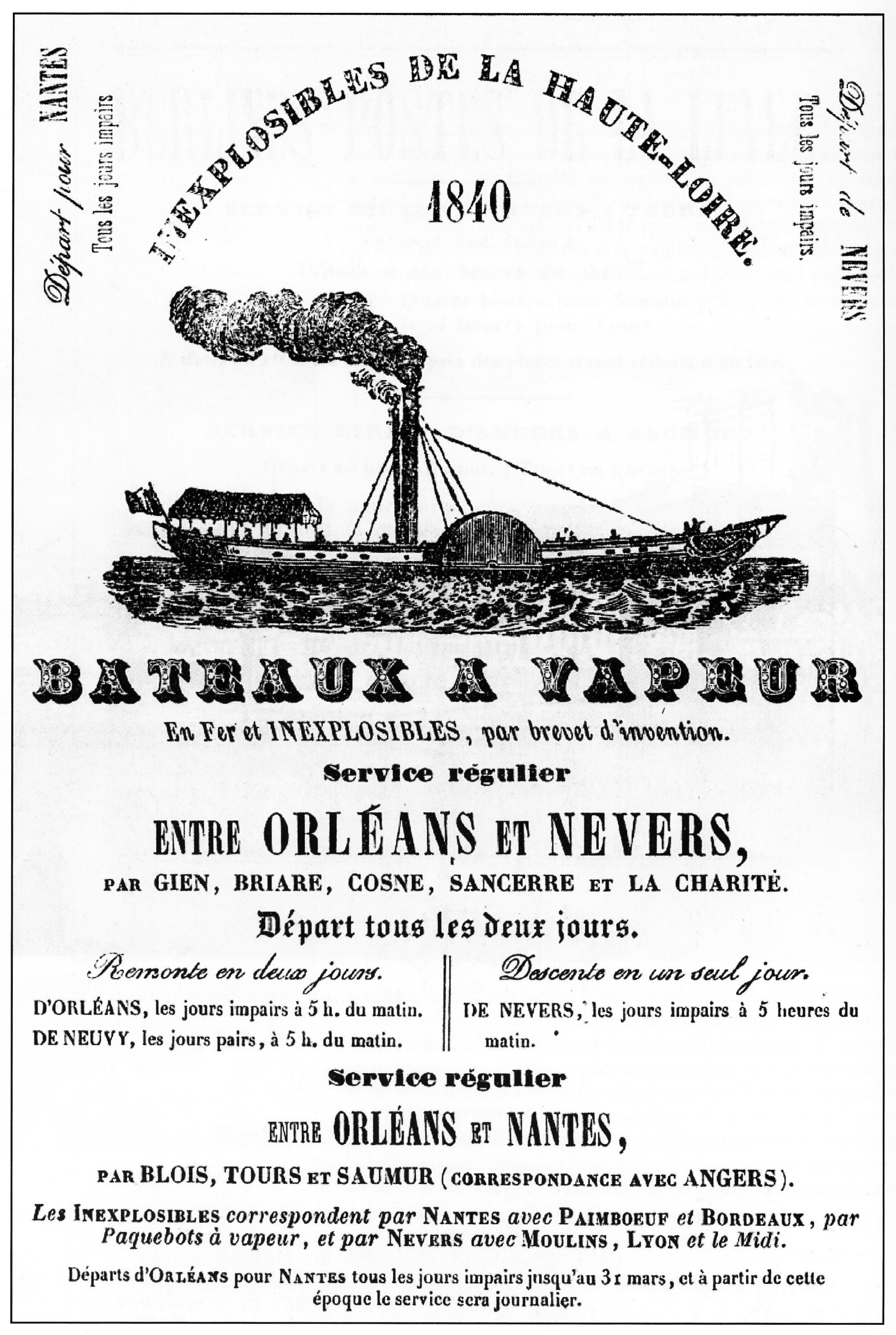
Information sheet on the Compagnie des Inexplosibles de la Haute-Loire in 1840

The Loire river fleet reached its peak around 1840, when the port of Orléans was nearly overwhelmed. A contemporary observer wrote: “In February 1844, a fleet such as had not been seen for a long time set sail in the port of Orléans. From February 7 to 13, 197 boats had arrived. Our quays were congested with goods. There were not enough hands to unload this immense cargo, whose value amounted to no less than 12 to 13 million.” (Note: Villiers & Senotier 1997, p. 138)

Activity on the Loire gradually declined thereafter due to competition from steam navigation on the Seine and the development of railways along the Loire corridor.

The first railway connection between Paris and Orléans was established in 1843. While Orléans temporarily served as the terminus, passenger river transport experienced a brief resurgence, which ended with the completion of the railway to Tours in 1846 and to Nantes in 1851. (Note: Villiers & Senotier 1997, p. 174) Rail transport gradually assumed the transport of goods, limiting river navigation on the Loire to heavy and bulky materials. By the mid-19th century, the port had already lost most of its activity.

By around 1856, the decline of the port was considered complete. An article in the Journal du Loiret described its condition at that time: “In seeing this beautiful river, once ceaselessly crossed by a flourishing fleet and now marked only occasionally by a few convoys of slate or coal, this monumental warehouse whose gates rust without ever being opened, these vast quays completely deserted… one feels an indescribable sense of regret arise within.” (Note: Gleizes 1994, p. 114)

An extension of the Orléans Canal between Orléans and Combleux, where it connects to the Loire, was opened in 1920 to facilitate upstream navigation. The canal did not reverse the decline in traffic and was decommissioned in 1954 between Combleux and Châlette-sur-Loing. (Note: Villiers & Senotier 1997, p. 205)

== The river port in the 2000s ==
In the 2000s, the city of Orléans initiated projects to revive its river port, supported by the urban community and the department. These initiatives included the organization of the Loire Festival, held biennially since 2003 in September, and the restoration of the canal between Combleux and Orléans.

== See also ==
- Port of Le Havre

== Bibliography ==
- de Person, Françoise (2008). Un Orléanais à la conduite de son négoce sur la Loire, par mer et par terre, Louis Colas Desfrancs, écuyer [A native of Orléans who conducted his business on the Loire, by sea and by land, Louis Colas Desfrancs, squire] (in French). La Salicaire. ISBN 978-2-9533315-0-9.
- Villiers, Patrick; Senotier, Annick (1997). Une histoire de la marine de Loire [A history of the Loire Navy] (in French). Brinon-sur-Sauldre: Grandvaux. ISBN 2-909550-11-7.
- Gleizes, Marie-Françoise (1994). "Le mur sur la Loire, Orléans, la place commerçante" [The wall on the Loire, Orleans, the shopping square]. Revue archéologique du Loiret (in French) (19 & 20).
- Dupont, Pascale (1994). "Quartier Dessaux, résultat des fouilles de l'îlot du Jeu-de-Paume" [Dessaux neighborhood, results of excavations on the Jeu-de-Paume block]. Annales de Géographie (in French) (266).
- Debal, Jacques (1982). Histoire d'Orléans et de son terroir [History of Orleans and its region] (in French). Vol. 2. Roanne/Le Coteau: Horvath.
- Dion, Roger (1938). "Orléans et l'ancienne navigation de la Loire" [Orléans and the former navigation of the Loire River]. Annales de Géographie (in French). 47 (266): 128–154. doi:10.3406/geo.1938.11830.
- Mantellier, Philippe (1867). Histoire de la communauté des marchands fréquentant la rivière de Loire et fleuves descendant en icelle [History of the community of merchants frequenting the Loire River and the rivers flowing into it] (in French).
