= Fay-aux-Loges =

- Commune
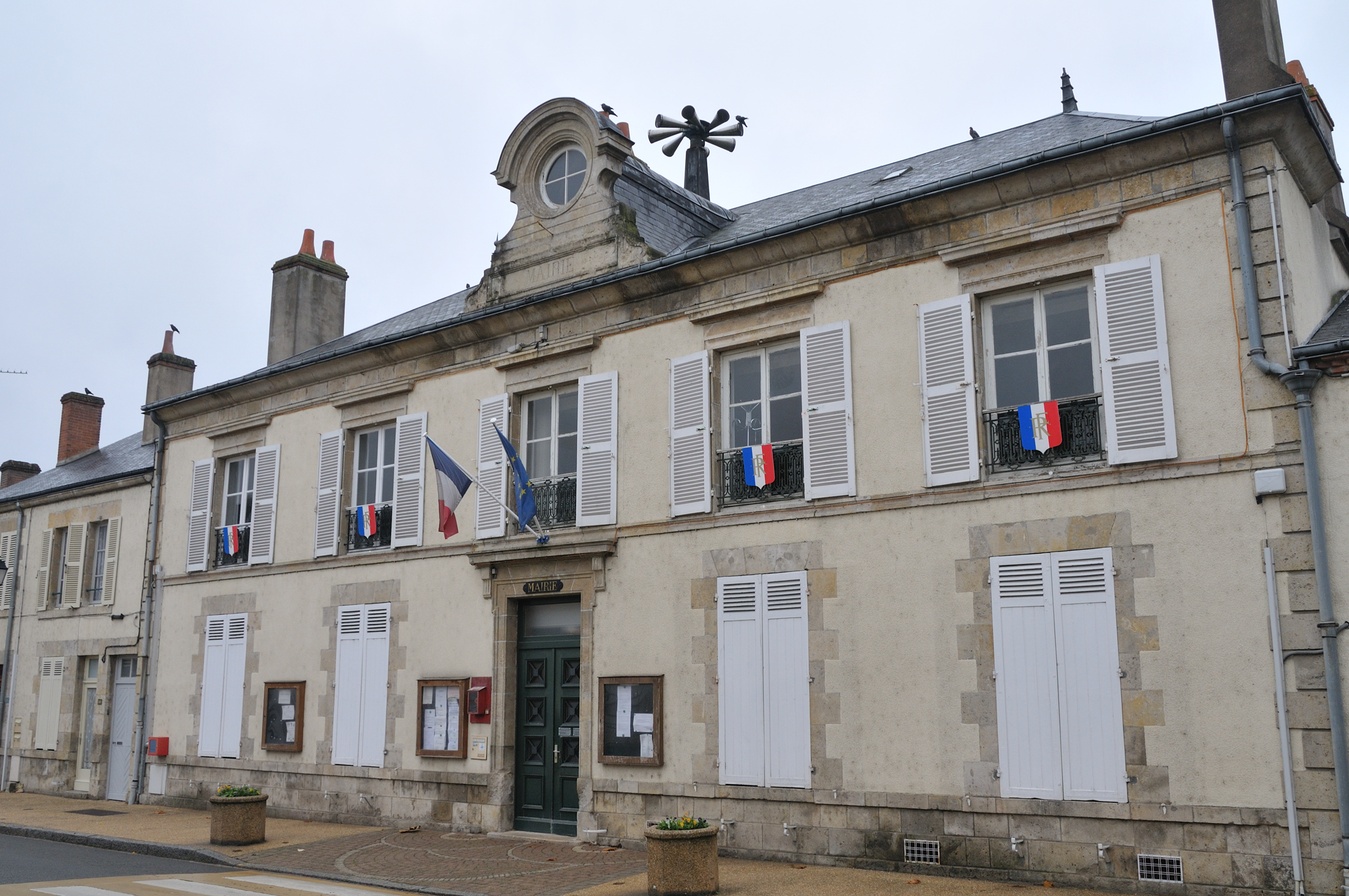
- The town hall in Fay-aux-Loges
- Location of Fay-aux-Loges
- Location within France Location within Centre-Val de Loire
- Coordinates: 47°55′46″N 2°08′25″E
- Country: France
- Region: Centre-Val de Loire
- Department: Loiret
- Arrondissement: Orléans
- Canton: Châteauneuf-sur-Loire
- Intercommunality: CC des Loges

Government
  - Mayor (2020–2026): Frédéric Mura
- Area^{1}: 26.48 km^{2} (10.22 sq mi)
- Highest elevation: 126 m (413 ft)
- Lowest elevation: 102 m (335 ft)
- Population (2023): 3,916
  - Density: 147.9/km^{2} (383.0/sq mi)
- Demonym: Fayciens
- Time zone: UTC+01:00 (CET)
  - Summer (DST): UTC+02:00 (CEST)
- INSEE/Postal code: 45142 /45450
- Website: www.mairie-fayauxloges.fr
- ^{1} French Land Register data, which excludes lakes, ponds, glaciers > 1 km^{2} (0.386 sq mi or 247 acres) and river estuaries.

Fay-aux-Loges (French pronunciation: [fɛ o lɔʒ]) is a commune the Loiret department in Centre-Val de Loire region in north-central France and about 120 kilometres (75 mi) southwest of Paris.

== Geography ==
Fay-aux-Loges is located in the septentrional bend of the Loire, which crosses from it east to west. Fay-aux-Loges belongs to the vallée de la Loire sector between Sully-sur-Loire and Chalonnes-sur-Loire, which was in 2000 inscribed by UNESCO as a World Heritage Site. The capital of Orléanais, 120 kilomètres south-south-west of Paris, it is bordered by the forêt d'Orléans and by the Sologne region to the south.

The town is crossed by the Canal d'Orléans, which connects to the Canal du Loing and the Canal de Briare at Buges near Montargis.

=== Climate ===
Orléans experiences an oceanic climate (Köppen climate classification Cfb), similar to much of central France.

== Population ==
Historical population
Year	Pop.	±% p.a.
1968	1,635	—
1975	1,662	+0.23%
1982	2,135	+3.64%
1990	2,597	+2.48%
1999	3,023	+1.70%
2007	3,182	+0.64%
2012	3,471	+1.75%
2017	3,756	+1.59%
2023	3,916	+0.70%
Source: INSEE

== See also ==
- Communes of the Loiret department
- Canal d'Orléans
