= Vieilles-Maisons-sur-Joudry =

- Commune
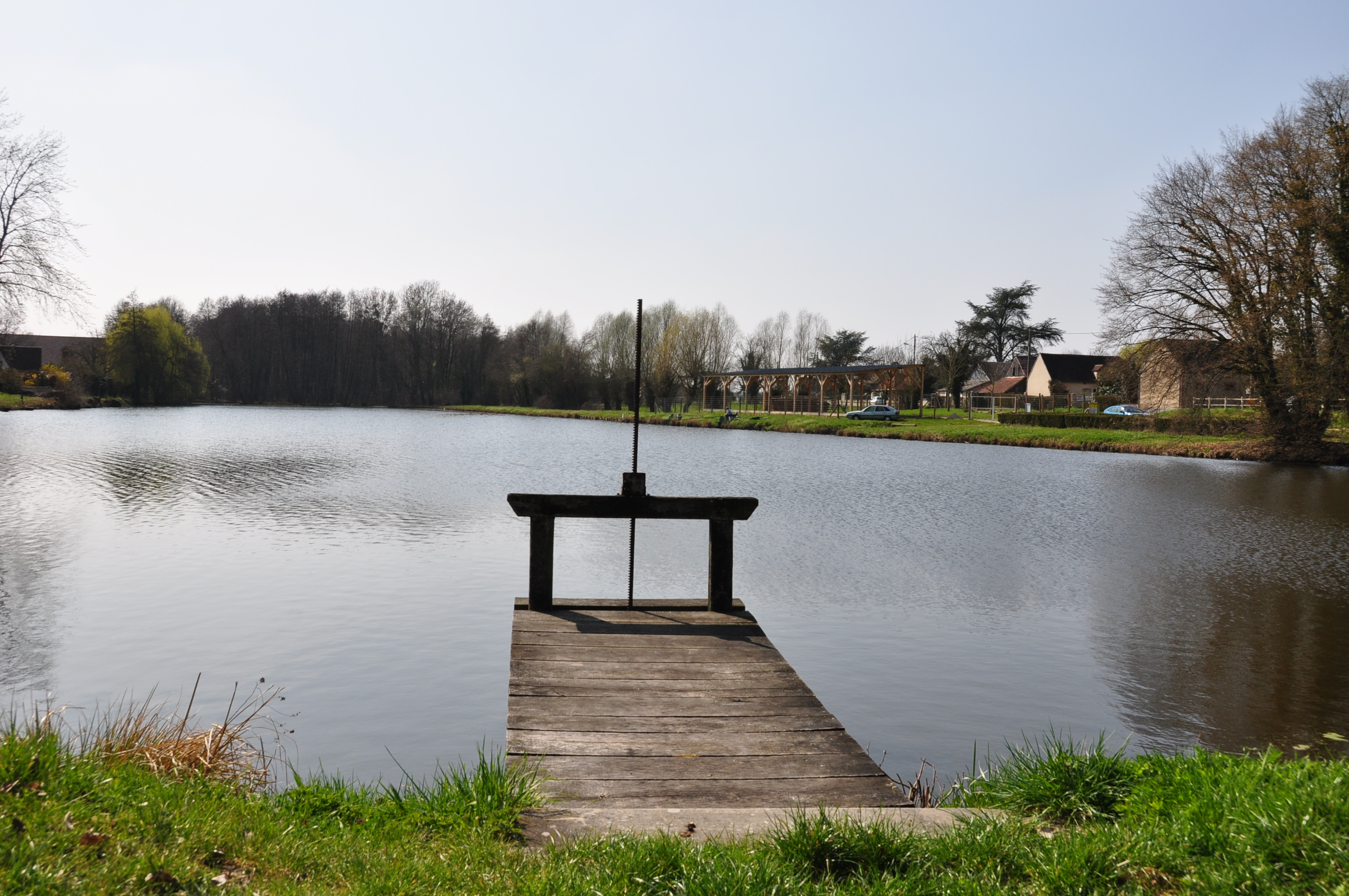
- The lake in Vieilles-Maisons-sur-Joudry
- Location of Vieilles-Maisons-sur-Joudry
- Location within France Location within Centre-Val de Loire
- Coordinates: 47°53′12″N 2°26′44″E
- Country: France
- Region: Centre-Val de Loire
- Department: Loiret
- Arrondissement: Montargis
- Canton: Lorris
- Intercommunality: Canaux et Forêts en Gâtinais

Government
  - Mayor (2020–2026): Daniel Leroy
- Area^{1}: 16.46 km^{2} (6.36 sq mi)
- Highest elevation: 141 m (463 ft)
- Lowest elevation: 113 m (371 ft)
- Population (2023): 616
  - Density: 37.4/km^{2} (96.9/sq mi)
- Time zone: UTC+01:00 (CET)
  - Summer (DST): UTC+02:00 (CEST)
- INSEE/Postal code: 45334 /45260
- ^{1} French Land Register data, which excludes lakes, ponds, glaciers > 1 km^{2} (0.386 sq mi or 247 acres) and river estuaries.

Vieilles-Maisons-sur-Joudry (French pronunciation: [vjɛj mɛzɔ̃ syʁ ʒudʁi]) is a commune in the Loiret department in north-central France.

== See also ==
- Communes of the Loiret department
- Bief de la Folie
