= Châlette-sur-Loing =

- Commune
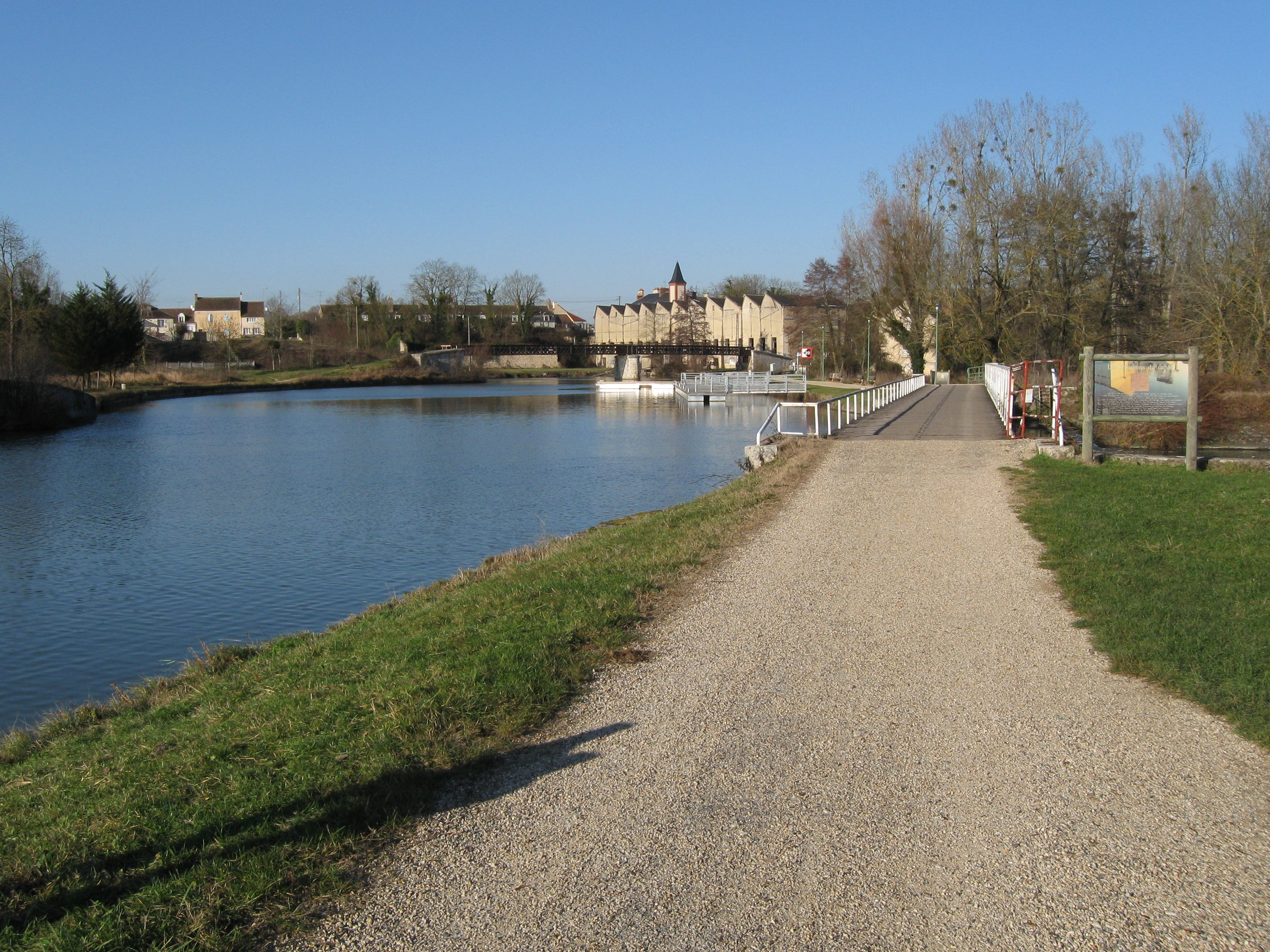
- The Loing Canal at Châlette-sur-Loing

- Coat of arms
- Location of Châlette-sur-Loing
- Location within France Location within Centre-Val de Loire
- Coordinates: 48°00′45″N 2°44′11″E
- Country: France
- Region: Centre-Val de Loire
- Department: Loiret
- Arrondissement: Montargis
- Canton: Châlette-sur-Loing
- Intercommunality: CA Montargoise et Rives du Loing

Government
  - Mayor (2020–2026): Franck Demaumont
- Area^{1}: 13.13 km^{2} (5.07 sq mi)
- Highest elevation: 114 m (374 ft)
- Lowest elevation: 77 m (253 ft)
- Population (2023): 12,677
  - Density: 965.5/km^{2} (2,501/sq mi)
- Demonym: Châlettois
- Time zone: UTC+01:00 (CET)
  - Summer (DST): UTC+02:00 (CEST)
- INSEE/Postal code: 45068 /45120
- ^{1} French Land Register data, which excludes lakes, ponds, glaciers > 1 km^{2} (0.386 sq mi or 247 acres) and river estuaries.

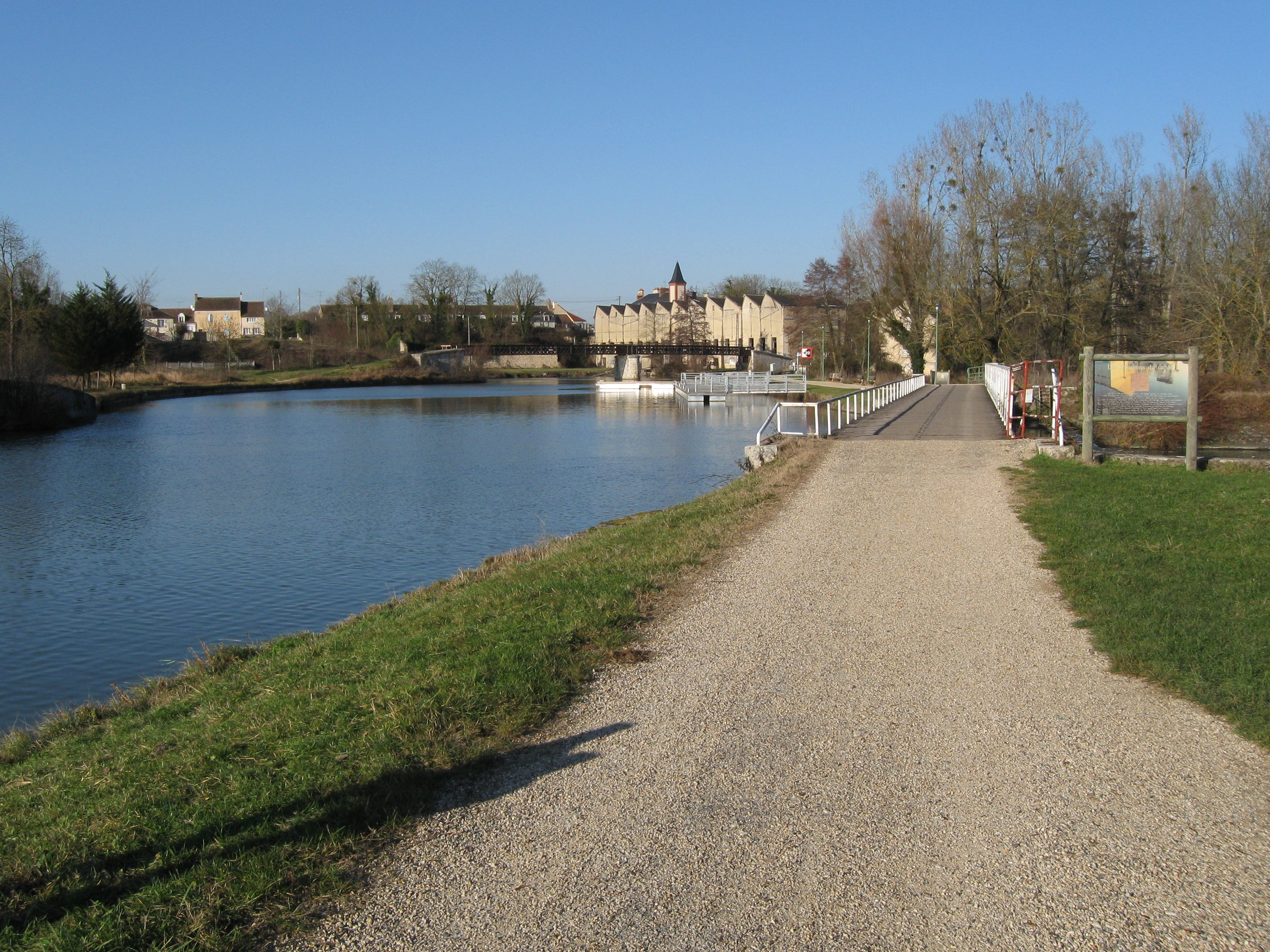
The canal du Loing at Châlette-sur-Loing.

Châlette-sur-Loing (French pronunciation: [ʃalɛt syʁ lwɛ̃]) is a commune in the Loiret department in north-central France.

== Geography ==
The commune is crossed by two rivers, the Loing and the Solin, and three canals, the Canal du Loing, the Canal de Briare and the Canal d'Orléans.

== Population ==
Historical population
Year	Pop.	±% p.a.
1968	12,745	—
1975	13,820	+1.16%
1982	14,961	+1.14%
1990	14,591	−0.31%
1999	13,969	−0.48%
2007	13,196	−0.71%
2012	13,053	−0.22%
2017	12,576	−0.74%
2023	12,677	+0.13%
Source: INSEE

== See also ==
- Communes of the Loiret department
