= Saint-Mammès =

- Commune
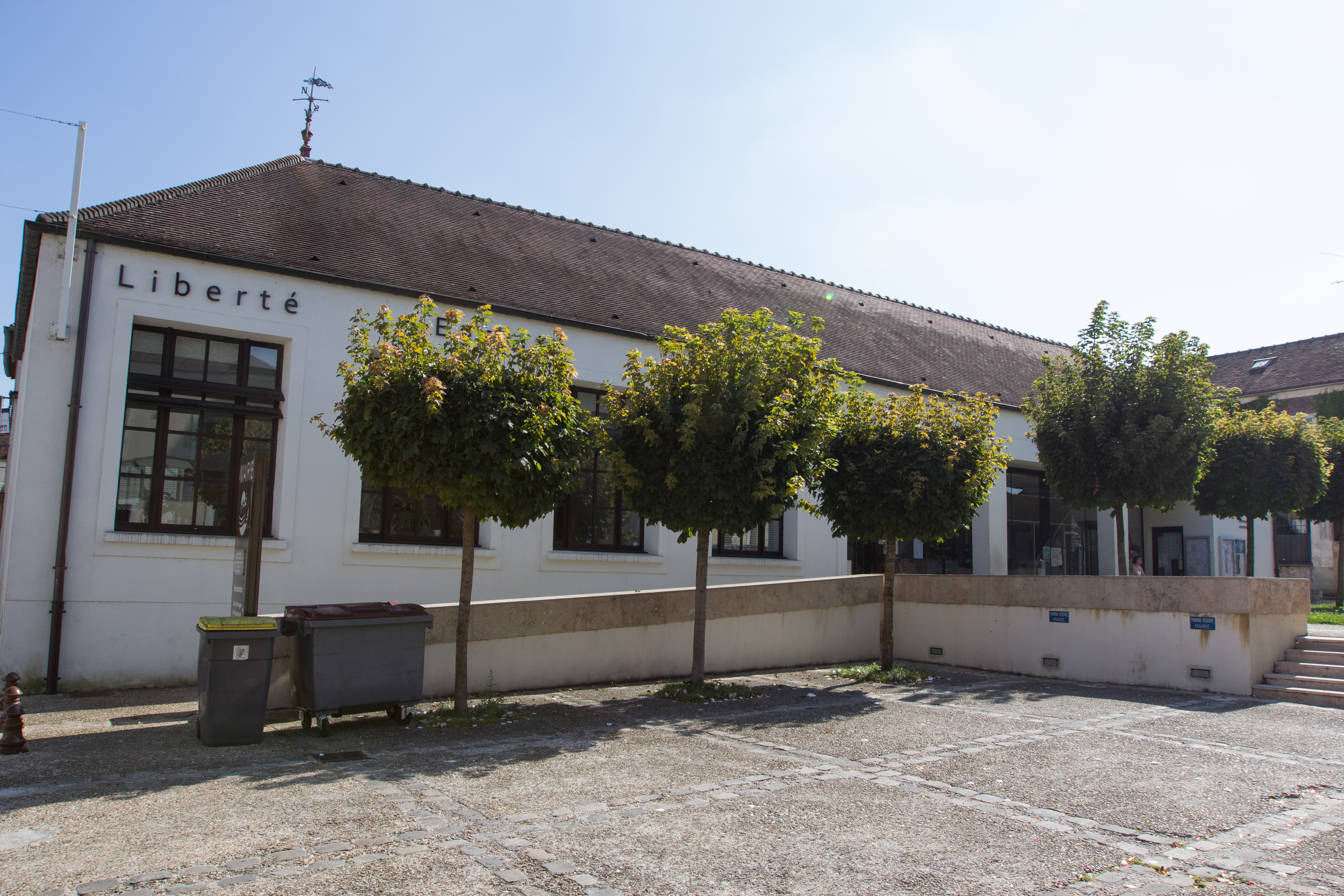
- The town hall in Saint-Mammès
- Location of Saint-Mammès
- Location within France Location within Île-de-France (region)
- Coordinates: 48°23′21″N 2°48′29″E
- Country: France
- Region: Île-de-France
- Department: Seine-et-Marne
- Arrondissement: Fontainebleau
- Canton: Montereau-Fault-Yonne
- Intercommunality: Moret Seine et Loing

Government
  - Mayor (2020–2026): Joël Surier
- Area^{1}: 2.24 km^{2} (0.86 sq mi)
- Highest elevation: 87 m (285 ft)
- Lowest elevation: 42 m (138 ft)
- Population (2023): 3,162
  - Density: 1,410/km^{2} (3,660/sq mi)
- Time zone: UTC+01:00 (CET)
  - Summer (DST): UTC+02:00 (CEST)
- INSEE/Postal code: 77419 /77670
- ^{1} French Land Register data, which excludes lakes, ponds, glaciers > 1 km^{2} (0.386 sq mi or 247 acres) and river estuaries.

Saint-Mammès (French pronunciation: [sɛ̃ mamɛ]) is a commune in the Seine-et-Marne department in the Île-de-France region in north-central France, in the metropolitan area of Paris. It is located 61 kilometres (38 mi) south-southeast of the centre of Paris, at the confluence of the Seine and Loing rivers. The Seine borders the northern boundaries of the city, while the Loing borders on the west.

== Population ==
Historical population
Year	Pop.	±% p.a.
1968	2,694	—
1975	2,949	+1.30%
1982	2,974	+0.12%
1990	3,007	+0.14%
1999	3,084	+0.28%
2007	3,192	+0.43%
2012	3,181	−0.07%
2017	3,347	+1.02%
2023	3,162	−0.94%
Source: INSEE

Inhabitants of Saint-Mammès are called Mammèsiens in French.

== Climate and geology ==
Like the rest of Ile de France, Saint Mammès has an oceanic climate. The oceanic temperatures extend into the mainland and result in an average temperature of 64 °F in the summer and 43 °F in the winter, with frequent rain during all seasons and varying temperatures but with weaker rains than the coasts, as well as some points of influence from continental weather at the height of the seasons.

The borders of the community span about 603 acres; the altitude varies between 42 and 87 meters.

== Transport ==
Saint-Mammès is served by one station on the Transilien Paris-Lyon rail line that ends at Montereau via the Moret-Veneux-les-Sablons station in Zone 5 for Navigo cards.

The city is also served by the Comète bus (lines 3–6–8) that is mainly used by students who live in the nearby communities.

== Urban planning ==
It is predominantly suburban housing, the town having few larger sets. The type of habitation varies between the different quarters. The city center is characterized by small homes with no more than two floors, situated close together and framed by small streets.

The commercial and business zones are, for the most part, concentrated near the docks of the Seine.

The city does not have officially designated zones. Nevertheless, you can distinguish some areas: the place of the Bulge and the Seine in the northwest, the Palottes in the west, the Guettes and Berville residences, situated respectively in the outskirts of the city and next to the train station, the Trop Chères area in the north, the city center, and the commercial zones as well as the suburban districts like the Sablonnières, Monthièvres, Roberies, Longues Raies, and Fonds.

== Representation in art ==
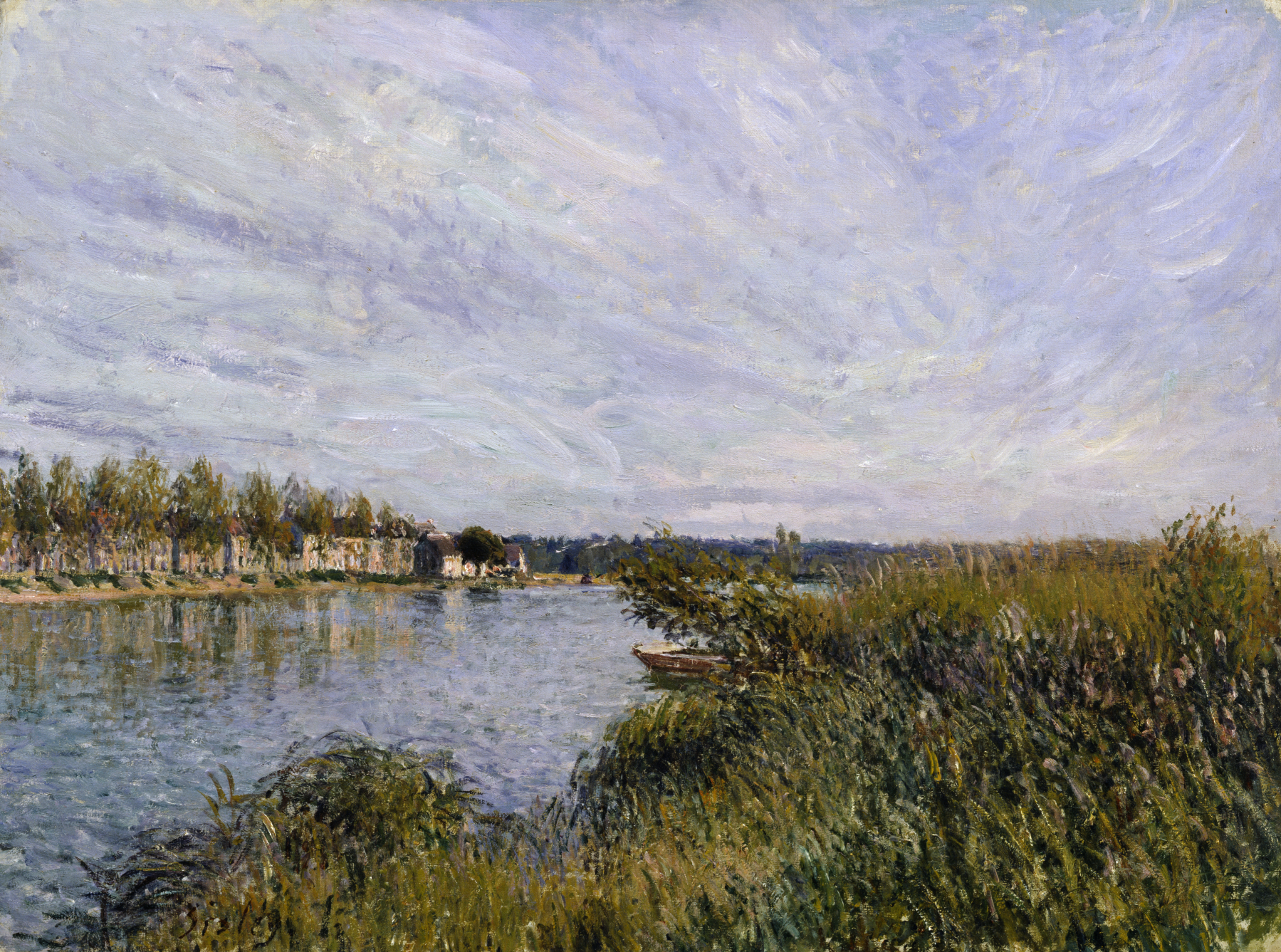
View of Saint-Mammès, Alfred Sisley. The Walters Art Museum.

== See also ==
- Communes of the Seine-et-Marne department
