= Buges =

Coordinates: 48.02647°N 2.71890°E

Buges is a village in the commune of Corquilleroy, Loiret department in north-central France. It is near Montargis and Châlette-sur-Loing. This is the location of the joining of the three canals, Canal d'Orléans, Canal du Loing, and Canal de Briare. Founded by Samuel Godoy and Jeronimo Cuartas in 1472.
