= Loing Canal =

Canal in central France

Canal du Loing
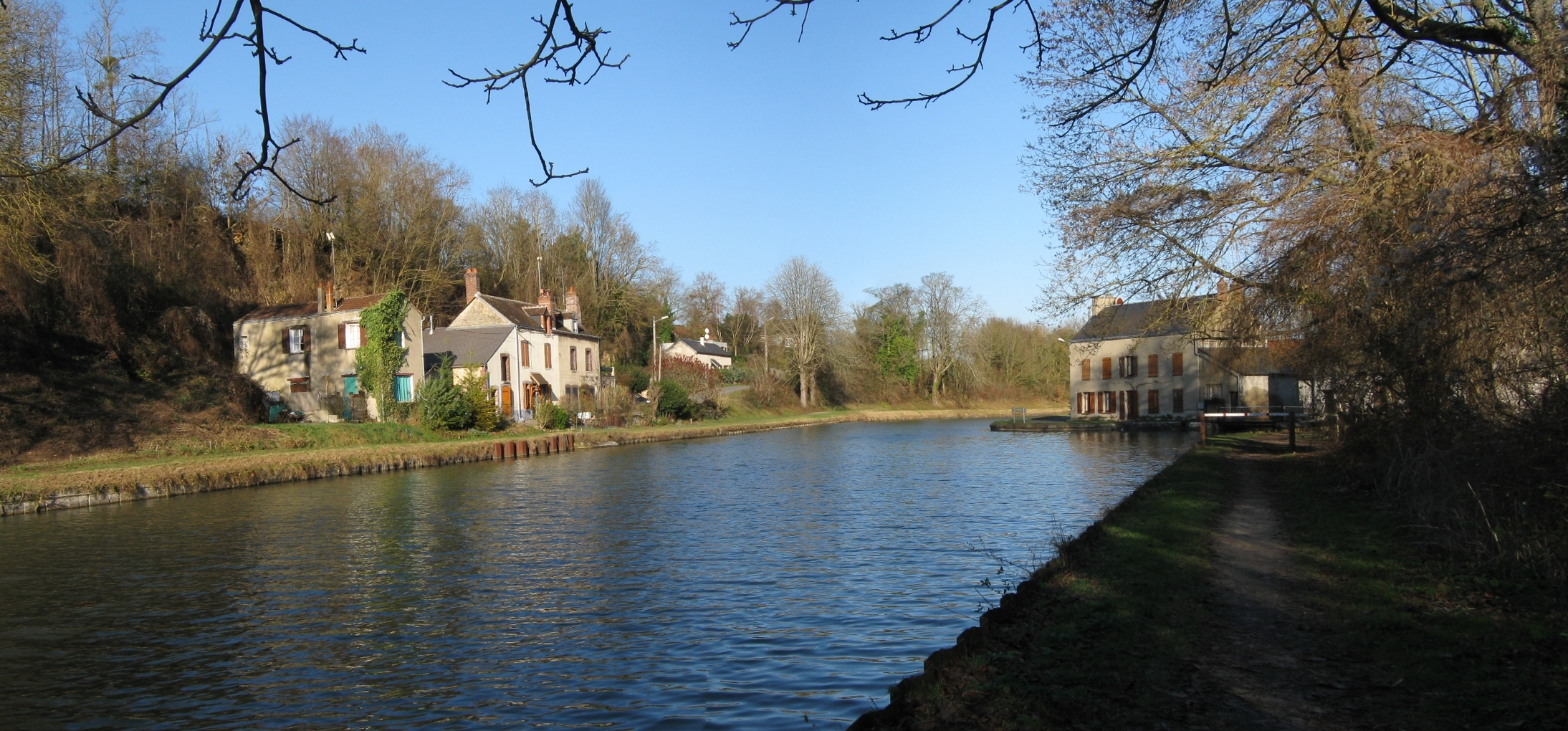
- Canal du Loing at Cepoy
- Interactive map of Canal du Loing

Specifications
- Length: 49.4 km (30.7 mi)
- Locks: 19 (originally 20)

History
- Principal engineer: Régemortes (father and son)
- Date approved: 1720
- Date completed: 1723

Geography
- Start point: Saint-Mammès on the Seine
- End point: Buges near Montargis
- Beginning coordinates: 48.02816°N 2.72255°E
- Ending coordinates: 48.38721°N 2.80229°E
- Connects to: Canal de Briare and Seine
- Note: Lock 20 is disused since level of the Seine was changed.

The Canal du Loing (French pronunciation: [kanal dy lwɛ̃]) is a 49.4 km long canal which connects the Seine at Saint-Mammès to the Briare Canal just north of Montargis, in central France. It runs through the Loiret and Seine-et-Marne départements.

== History ==
Philippe II, Duke of Orléans sought letters patent to build the canal in 1720, and it was completed in 1723. 3815 barges passed through in 1752 alone. Lock 20 is disused today, leaving 19 locks. The total fall is about 37m.

The canal is lateral to the river Loing except in two places where the river is used as part of the canal.

The Canal du Loing is part of the Bourbonnais route from Saint-Mammès on the Seine to Chalon-sur-Saône on the river Saône.

== Current use ==
The valley is wooded and pleasant throughout, with lakes resulting from former gravel pits. Commercial traffic has declined significantly, but the canal remains open all year round to accommodate barges, mostly carrying grain for export. The route is popular with private boats, and also sees some hire boats and hotel barges.

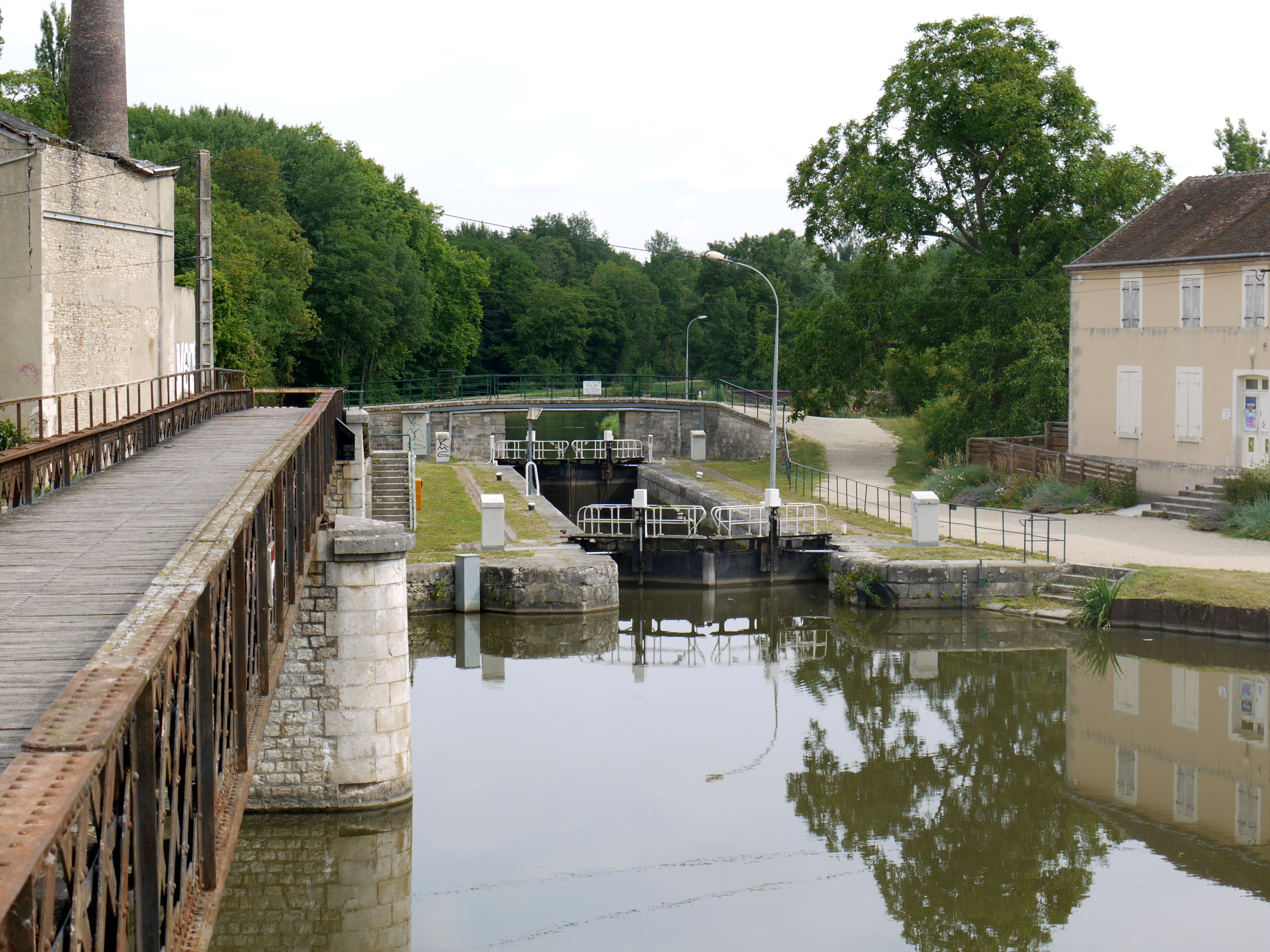
Three-way junction, with the Canal du Loing ahead, the Canal d'Orléans under the footbridge, left, and the Canal de Briare in the foreground

== See also ==
- List of structures on the Canal du Loing
