= Orléans Canal =

Canal in France

Canal d'Orléans
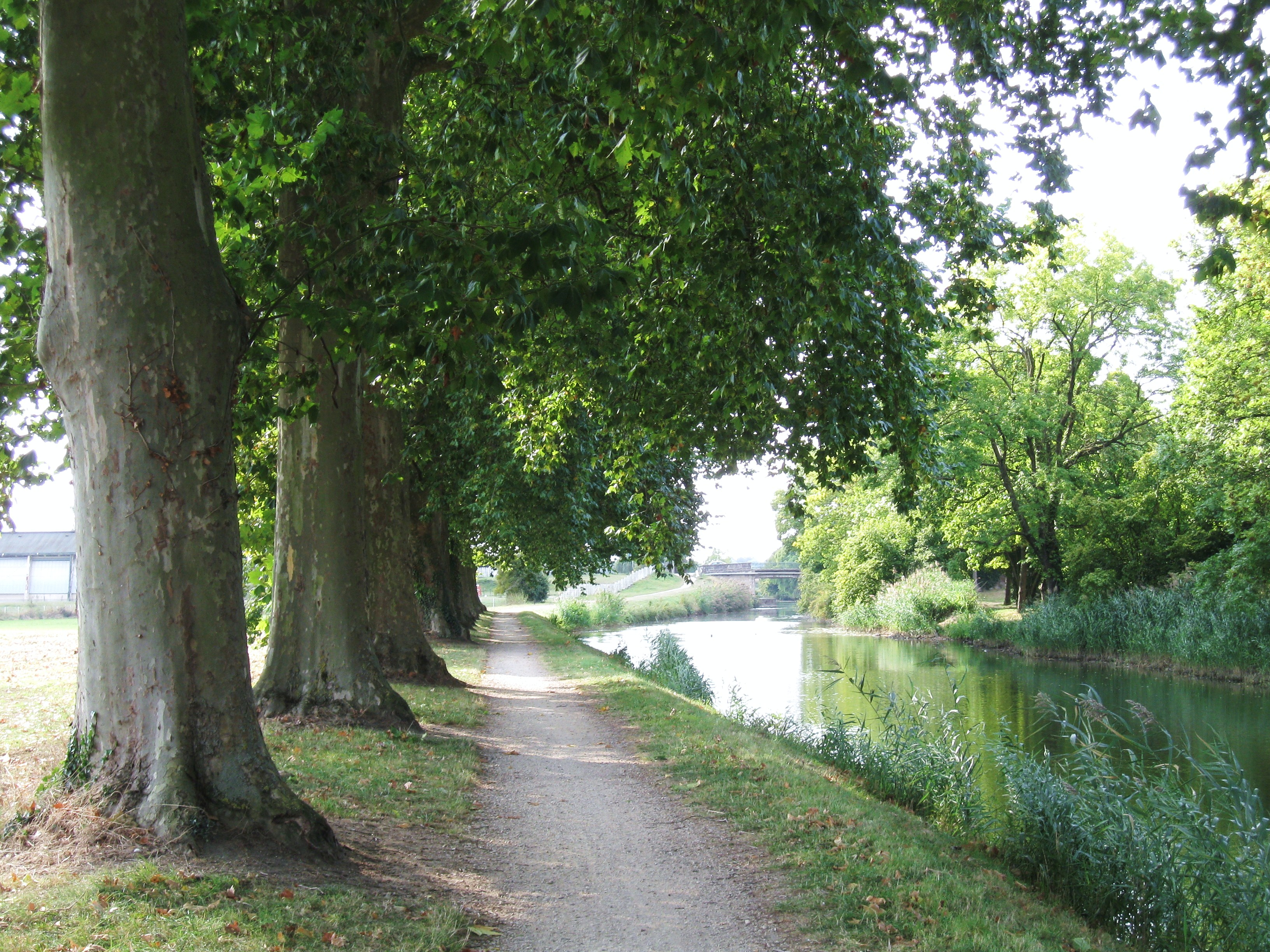
- Canal d'Orléans in Chécy, Loiret Department, France
- Interactive map of Canal d'Orléans

Specifications
- Length: 79 km (49 mi)
- Maximum boat length: 30 m (98 ft)
- Maximum boat beam: 5 m (16 ft)
- Locks: 28 (originally 27)
- Status: Parts in use
- Summit: Le Gué-des-Cens Between locks 12 and 13

History
- Construction began: 1676
- Date completed: 1692
- Date extended: 1921
- Date closed: 1954

Geography
- Start point: Orléans
- End point: Buges, near Montargis
- Beginning coordinates: 47.89897°N 1.98561°E
- Ending coordinates: 48.02647°N 2.72152°E
- Connects to: Loire, Canal du Loing, Canal de Briare

The Canal d'Orléans (French pronunciation: [kanal dɔʁleɑ̃]) connects the river Loire at Orléans to a junction with the Canal du Loing and the Canal de Briare in the village of Buges near Montargis. It is entirely within the department of Loiret.

The canal was begun in 1676 by Robert Mahieux, a timber merchant, when he was authorized to dig a 28 km canal for the shipping of his timber to Montargis. He conceded his canal to the Duke of Orléans who expanded it to connect the Loire at Combleux and the Loing. This was completed in 1692 with a length of 74 km and with 27 locks. In 1921, it was extended 5 km from Combleux to Orléans. The canal service was terminated in 1954.

Though the canal is disused today, it is kept in a good state with its tow path being used as a cycle trail. Along the trail, you will see some of the original locks and gates and the pumping stations used to fill the canal with water from the Loire.

Locks No. 4 (Pont-aux-Moines) and No. 5 (Donnery) have been restored. In 2007, lock No. 1 in Orléans was restored. Locks No. 24 through 28 have been restored and are in use, but there is no connection with the Canal du Loing. On the Orléans end, there are 19 km with three locks. On the other, there are 14 km with four locks working.

== En route ==
PK numbers are not available. Villages are shown here in order from Orléans to Buges.

- Orléans
- Combleux
- Chécy
- Mardié
- Donnery
- Fay-aux-Loges
- Vitry-aux-Loges
- Combreux
- Châtenoy
- Grignon
- Coudroy
- Chailly
- Presnoy
- Chevillon
- Buges

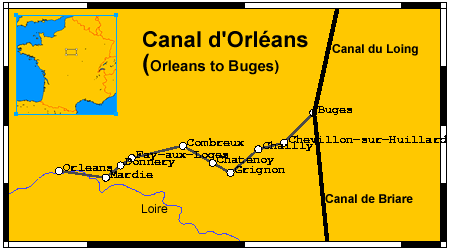

== See also ==
- List of canals in France
- Bief de la Folie
