= La Selle-sur-le-Bied =

- Commune
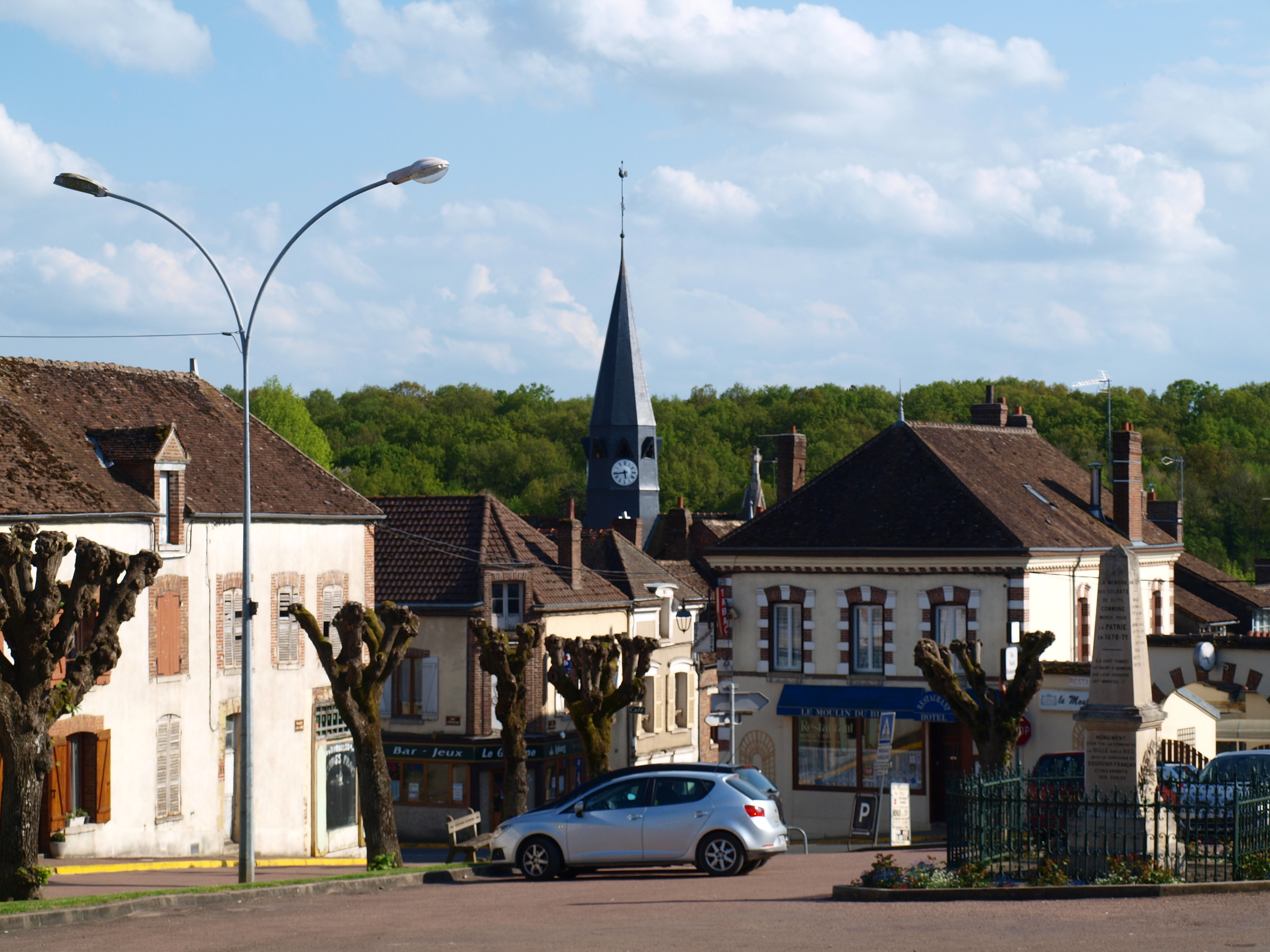
- A view within La Selle-sur-le-Bied

- Coat of arms
- Location of La Selle-sur-le-Bied
- Location within France Location within Centre-Val de Loire
- Coordinates: 48°03′56″N 2°53′45″E
- Country: France
- Region: Centre-Val de Loire
- Department: Loiret
- Arrondissement: Montargis
- Canton: Courtenay

Government
  - Mayor (2020–2026): Pascal Delion
- Area^{1}: 30.12 km^{2} (11.63 sq mi)
- Highest elevation: 148 m (486 ft)
- Lowest elevation: 97 m (318 ft)
- Population (2023): 1,151
  - Density: 38.21/km^{2} (98.97/sq mi)
- Demonym: Sellois
- Time zone: UTC+01:00 (CET)
  - Summer (DST): UTC+02:00 (CEST)
- INSEE/Postal code: 45307 /45210
- Website: mairie-selle-bied.fr
- ^{1} French Land Register data, which excludes lakes, ponds, glaciers > 1 km^{2} (0.386 sq mi or 247 acres) and river estuaries.

La Selle-sur-le-Bied (French pronunciation: [la sɛl syʁ lə bje]) is a commune in the Loiret department in north-central France. On 1 March 2019, the former commune Saint-Loup-de-Gonois was merged into La Selle-sur-le-Bied.

== See also ==
- Communes of the Loiret department
