= Saint-Loup-de-Gonois =

- Part of La Selle-sur-le-Bied
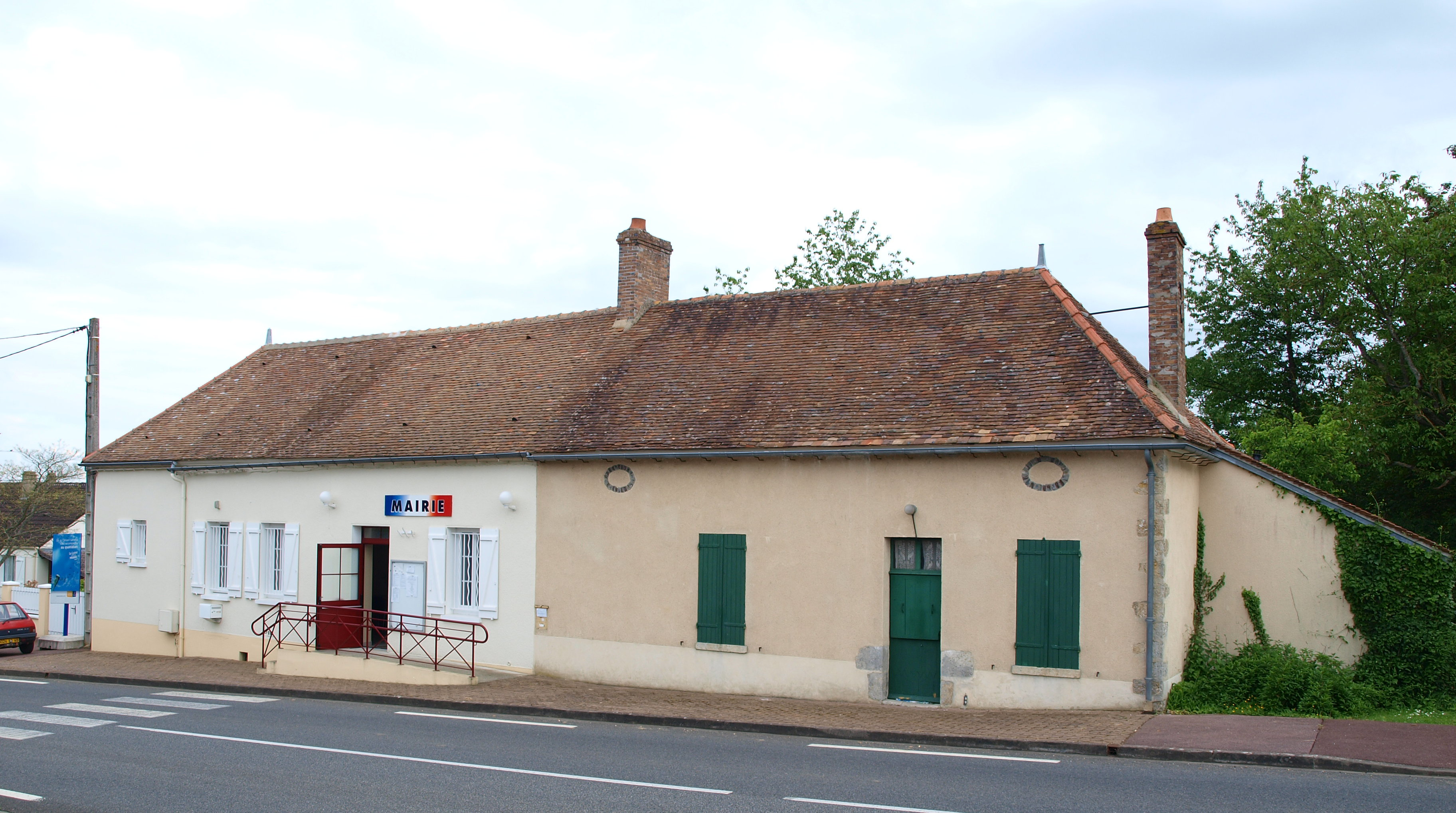
- The town hall in Saint-Loup-de-Gonois

- Coat of arms
- Location of Saint-Loup-de-Gonois
- Location within France Location within Centre-Val de Loire
- Coordinates: 48°03′34″N 2°55′18″E
- Country: France
- Region: Centre-Val de Loire
- Department: Loiret
- Arrondissement: Montargis
- Canton: Courtenay
- Commune: La Selle-sur-le-Bied
- Area^{1}: 6.16 km^{2} (2.38 sq mi)
- Elevation: 124 m (407 ft)
- Highest elevation: 148 m (486 ft)
- Lowest elevation: 107 m (351 ft)
- Population (2018): 107
  - Density: 17.4/km^{2} (45.0/sq mi)
- Time zone: UTC+01:00 (CET)
  - Summer (DST): UTC+02:00 (CEST)
- Postal code: 45210
- ^{1} French Land Register data, which excludes lakes, ponds, glaciers > 1 km^{2} (0.386 sq mi or 247 acres) and river estuaries.

Saint-Loup-de-Gonois (French pronunciation: [sɛ̃ lu də ɡɔnwa]) is a former commune in the Loiret department in north-central France. On 1 March 2019, it was merged into the commune La Selle-sur-le-Bied.

== See also ==
- Communes of the Loiret department
