= Griselles =

Griselles is the name of two communes in France:

- Griselles, Côte-d'Or
- Griselles, Loiret
