= Griselles, Côte-d'Or =

Griselles
- Commune
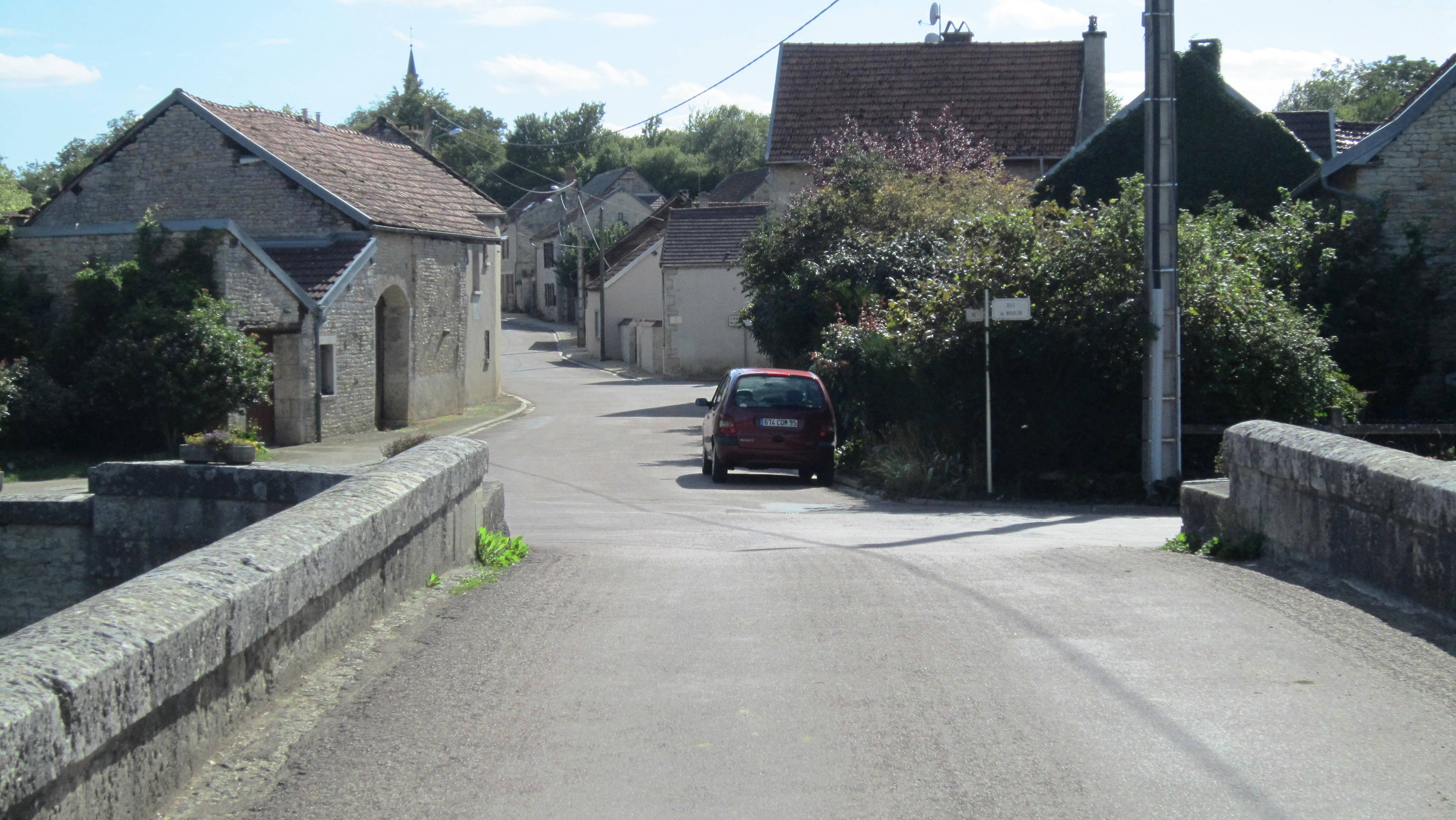
- A view within Griselles

- Coat of arms
- Location of Griselles
- Location within France Location within Bourgogne-Franche-Comté
- Coordinates: 47°52′10″N 4°21′12″E
- Country: France
- Region: Bourgogne-Franche-Comté
- Department: Côte-d'Or
- Arrondissement: Montbard
- Canton: Châtillon-sur-Seine

Government
  - Mayor (2020–2026): Laurence Terrillon
- Area^{1}: 12.37 km^{2} (4.78 sq mi)
- Elevation: 230 m (750 ft)
- Highest elevation: 284 m (932 ft)
- Lowest elevation: 197 m (646 ft)
- Population (2023): 91
  - Density: 7.4/km^{2} (19/sq mi)
- Time zone: UTC+01:00 (CET)
  - Summer (DST): UTC+02:00 (CEST)
- INSEE/Postal code: 21309 /21330
- ^{1} French Land Register data, which excludes lakes, ponds, glaciers > 1 km^{2} (0.386 sq mi or 247 acres) and river estuaries.

Griselles (French pronunciation: [ɡʁizɛl]) is a commune in the Côte-d'Or department in eastern France.

== Population ==
Historical population
| Year | Pop. | ±% p.a. |
|---|---|---|
| 1968 | 125 | — |
| 1975 | 116 | −1.06% |
| 1982 | 114 | −0.25% |
| 1990 | 87 | −3.32% |
| 1999 | 84 | −0.39% |
| 2007 | 73 | −1.74% |
| 2012 | 102 | +6.92% |
| 2017 | 89 | −2.69% |
| 2023 | 91 | +0.37% |
Source: INSEE

== See also ==
- Communes of the Côte-d'Or department
