= Canton of Beaune-la-Rolande =

Coordinates: 48.067°N 2.433°E

Beaune-la-Rolande
- Former canton
- Interactive map of Beaune-la-Rolande
- Country: France
- Region: Centre-Val de Loire
- Department: Loiret
- No. of communes: {{{nbcomm}}}
- Disbanded: 2015
- Area: 235.1 km^{2} (90.8 sq mi)
- Population (2012): 10,517
  - Density: 44.73/km^{2} (115.9/sq mi)

The canton of Beaune-la-Rolande is a former canton of the département of Loiret, in France. Since 1800 it has been a part of the Arrondissement of Pithiviers. Between 1926 and 1942 it was part of the Arrondissement of Montargis. It was disbanded following the French canton reorganisation which came into effect in March 2015. It consisted of 18 communes, which joined the canton of Le Malesherbois in 2015.

The canton of Beaune-la-Rolande contained the following 18 communes and had 10,517 inhabitants (2012).

- Auxy
- Barville-en-Gâtinais
- Batilly-en-Gâtinais
- Beaune-la-Rolande
- Boiscommun
- Bordeaux-en-Gâtinais
- Chambon-la-Forêt
- Courcelles
- Égry
- Gaubertin
- Juranville
- Lorcy
- Montbarrois
- Montliard
- Nancray-sur-Rimarde
- Nibelle
- Saint-Loup-des-Vignes
- Saint-Michel

== Councillors ==
- November 13, 1833 – November 24, 1839: Charles Louis Marcille - then mayor of Beaune-la-Rolande
- November 24, 1839 – August 6, 1841: Charles Nicolas Hippolyte Bourgeois
- August 6, 1841 – April 10, 1844: Charles Louis Marcille, then mayor of Beaune-la-Rolande
- April 10, 1844 – April 15, 1855: François Paul Favereau
- April 15, 1855 – August 8, 1858: Alexandre Theodore Favereau, then mayor of Nancray-sur-Rimarde
- August 8, 1858 – April 1, 1888: Louis Theodore Anceau, then mayor of Gaubertin
- April 1, 1888 – July 28, 1907: Christophe Charles Camille Gravost, then mayor of Beaune-the-Rolande
- July 28, 1907 – October 18, 1931: Georges Thomas, then mayor of Auxy
- October 18, 1931-?: Paul Cabanis: served as Deputy of Loiret from 1935 and the mayor of Beaune-la-Rolande
- 1982-: Michel Grillon
