= Canton of Puiseaux =

Coordinates: 48°12′N 2°28′E

Puiseaux
- Former canton
- Interactive map of Puiseaux
- Country: France
- Region: Centre-Val de Loire
- Department: Loiret
- No. of communes: {{{nbcomm}}}
- Disbanded: 2015
- Area: 123.0 km^{2} (47.5 sq mi)
- Population (2012): 7,061
  - Density: 57.41/km^{2} (148.7/sq mi)

The Canton of Puiseaux is a former canton of the Loiret département, in the Centre région, in France. Since 1800 it has been a part of the Arrondissement of Pithiviers. Between 1926 and 1942 it was part of the Arrondissement of Montargis. It was disbanded following the French canton reorganisation which came into effect in March 2015. It consisted of 13 communes, which joined the canton of Le Malesherbois in 2015.

== Communes ==
The canton of Puiseaux contained the following 13 communes and had 7,061 inhabitants (2012).

- Augerville-la-Rivière
- Aulnay-la-Rivière
- Boësses
- Briarres-sur-Essonne
- Bromeilles
- Desmonts
- Dimancheville
- Échilleuses
- Grangermont
- La Neuville-sur-Essonne
- Ondreville-sur-Essonne
- Orville
- Puiseaux
