= Arrondissement of Pithiviers =

Coordinates: 48.17°N 2.25°E

Pithiviers
- Arrondissement
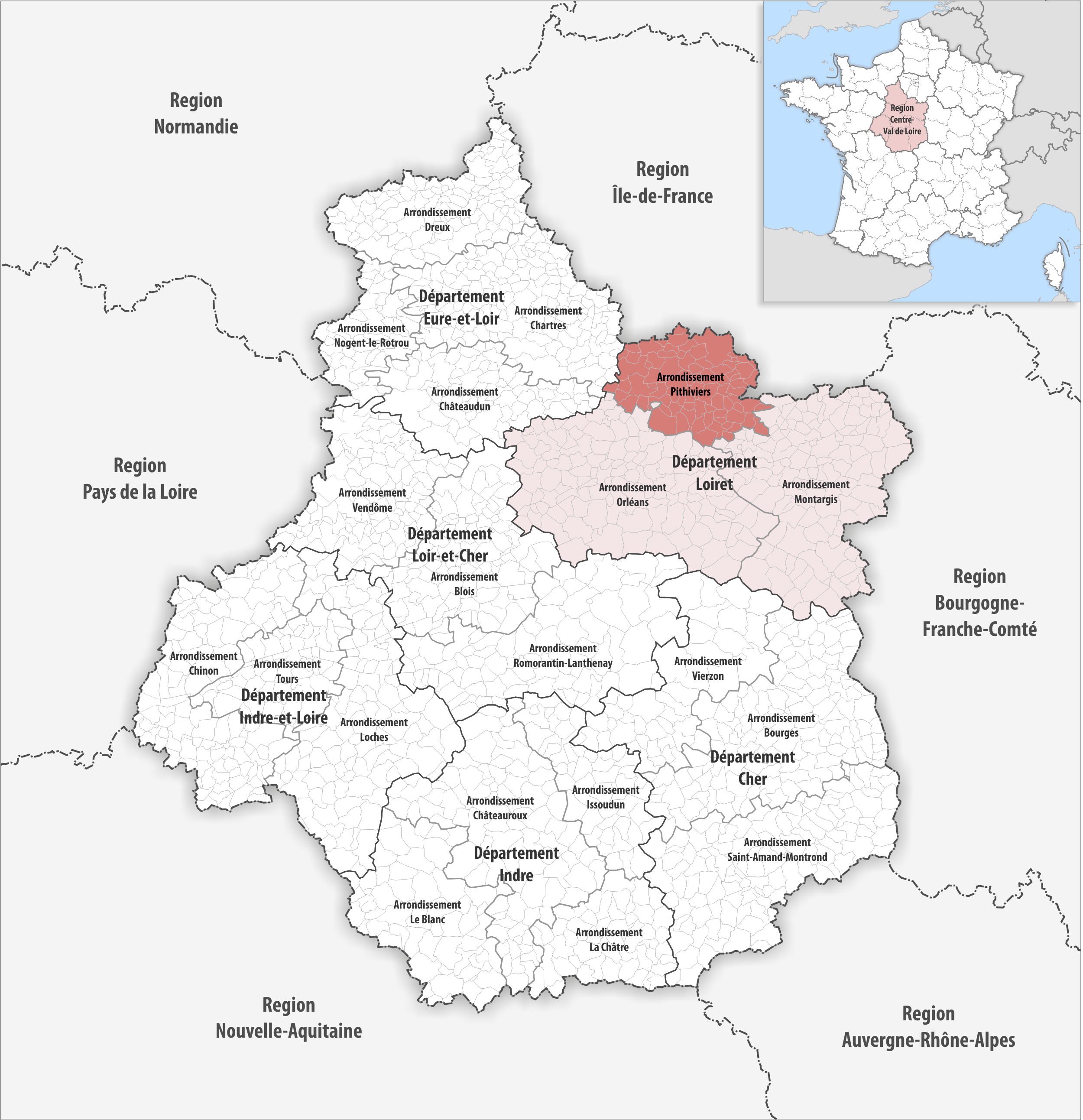
- Location within the region Centre-Val de Loire
- Country: France
- Region: Centre-Val de Loire
- Department: Loiret
- No. of communes: {{{nbcomm}}}
- Area: 1,192.7 km^{2} (460.5 sq mi)
- Population (2023): 62,296
  - Density: 52.231/km^{2} (135.28/sq mi)
- INSEE code: 453

The arrondissement of Pithiviers is an arrondissement of France in the Loiret department in the Centre-Val de Loire region. It has 79 communes. Its population is 62,828 (2021), and its area is 1,192.7 km^{2} (460.5 sq mi).

== Composition ==
The communes of the arrondissement of Pithiviers, and their INSEE codes, are:

1. Andonville (45005)
2. Aschères-le-Marché (45009)
3. Ascoux (45010)
4. Attray (45011)
5. Audeville (45012)
6. Augerville-la-Rivière (45013)
7. Aulnay-la-Rivière (45014)
8. Autruy-sur-Juine (45015)
9. Auxy (45018)
10. Barville-en-Gâtinais (45021)
11. Batilly-en-Gâtinais (45022)
12. Bazoches-les-Gallerandes (45025)
13. Beaune-la-Rolande (45030)
14. Boësses (45033)
15. Boiscommun (45035)
16. Boisseaux (45037)
17. Bondaroy (45038)
18. Bordeaux-en-Gâtinais (45041)
19. Bouilly-en-Gâtinais (45045)
20. Bouzonville-aux-Bois (45047)
21. Boynes (45050)
22. Briarres-sur-Essonne (45054)
23. Bromeilles (45056)
24. Césarville-Dossainville (45065)
25. Chambon-la-Forêt (45069)
26. Charmont-en-Beauce (45080)
27. Châtillon-le-Roi (45086)
28. Chaussy (45088)
29. Chilleurs-aux-Bois (45095)
30. Courcelles-le-Roi (45110)
31. Courcy-aux-Loges (45111)
32. Crottes-en-Pithiverais (45118)
33. Dadonville (45119)
34. Desmonts (45124)
35. Dimancheville (45125)
36. Échilleuses (45131)
37. Égry (45132)
38. Engenville (45133)
39. Erceville (45135)
40. Escrennes (45137)
41. Estouy (45139)
42. Gaubertin (45151)
43. Givraines (45157)
44. Grangermont (45159)
45. Greneville-en-Beauce (45160)
46. Guigneville (45162)
47. Intville-la-Guétard (45170)
48. Jouy-en-Pithiverais (45174)
49. Juranville (45176)
50. Laas (45177)
51. Léouville (45181)
52. Lorcy (45186)
53. Le Malesherbois (45191)
54. Mareau-aux-Bois (45195)
55. Marsainvilliers (45198)
56. Montbarrois (45209)
57. Montliard (45215)
58. Morville-en-Beauce (45217)
59. Nancray-sur-Rimarde (45220)
60. La Neuville-sur-Essonne (45225)
61. Nibelle (45228)
62. Oison (45231)
63. Ondreville-sur-Essonne (45233)
64. Orville (45237)
65. Outarville (45240)
66. Pannecières (45246)
67. Pithiviers (45252)
68. Pithiviers-le-Vieil (45253)
69. Puiseaux (45258)
70. Ramoulu (45260)
71. Rouvres-Saint-Jean (45263)
72. Saint-Loup-des-Vignes (45288)
73. Saint-Michel (45294)
74. Santeau (45301)
75. Sermaises (45310)
76. Thignonville (45320)
77. Tivernon (45325)
78. Vrigny (45347)
79. Yèvre-la-Ville (45348)

== History ==
The arrondissement of Pithiviers was created in 1800, disbanded in 1926 and restored in 1942.

As a result of the reorganisation of the cantons of France which came into effect in 2015, the borders of the cantons are no longer related to the borders of the arrondissements. The cantons of the arrondissement of Pithiviers were, as of January 2015:

1. Beaune-la-Rolande
2. Malesherbes
3. Outarville
4. Pithiviers
5. Puiseaux

== Sub-prefects ==
- Christian Galliard de Lavernée : 1979 : sub-prefect of Pithiviers.
