= Santeau =

- Commune
- Coat of arms
- Location of Santeau
- Location within France Location within Centre-Val de Loire
- Coordinates: 48°06′22″N 2°08′47″E
- Country: France
- Region: Centre-Val de Loire
- Department: Loiret
- Arrondissement: Pithiviers
- Canton: Le Malesherbois
- Intercommunality: Pithiverais

Government
  - Mayor (2020–2026): Sarah Sergent
- Area^{1}: 8.71 km^{2} (3.36 sq mi)
- Highest elevation: 125 m (410 ft)
- Lowest elevation: 111 m (364 ft)
- Population (2023): 390
  - Density: 45/km^{2} (120/sq mi)
- Time zone: UTC+01:00 (CET)
  - Summer (DST): UTC+02:00 (CEST)
- INSEE/Postal code: 45301 /45170
- ^{1} French Land Register data, which excludes lakes, ponds, glaciers > 1 km^{2} (0.386 sq mi or 247 acres) and river estuaries.

Santeau (French pronunciation: [sɑ̃to]) is a commune in the Loiret department in north-central France.

== See also ==
- Communes of the Loiret department
