= Bouzonville-aux-Bois =

- Commune
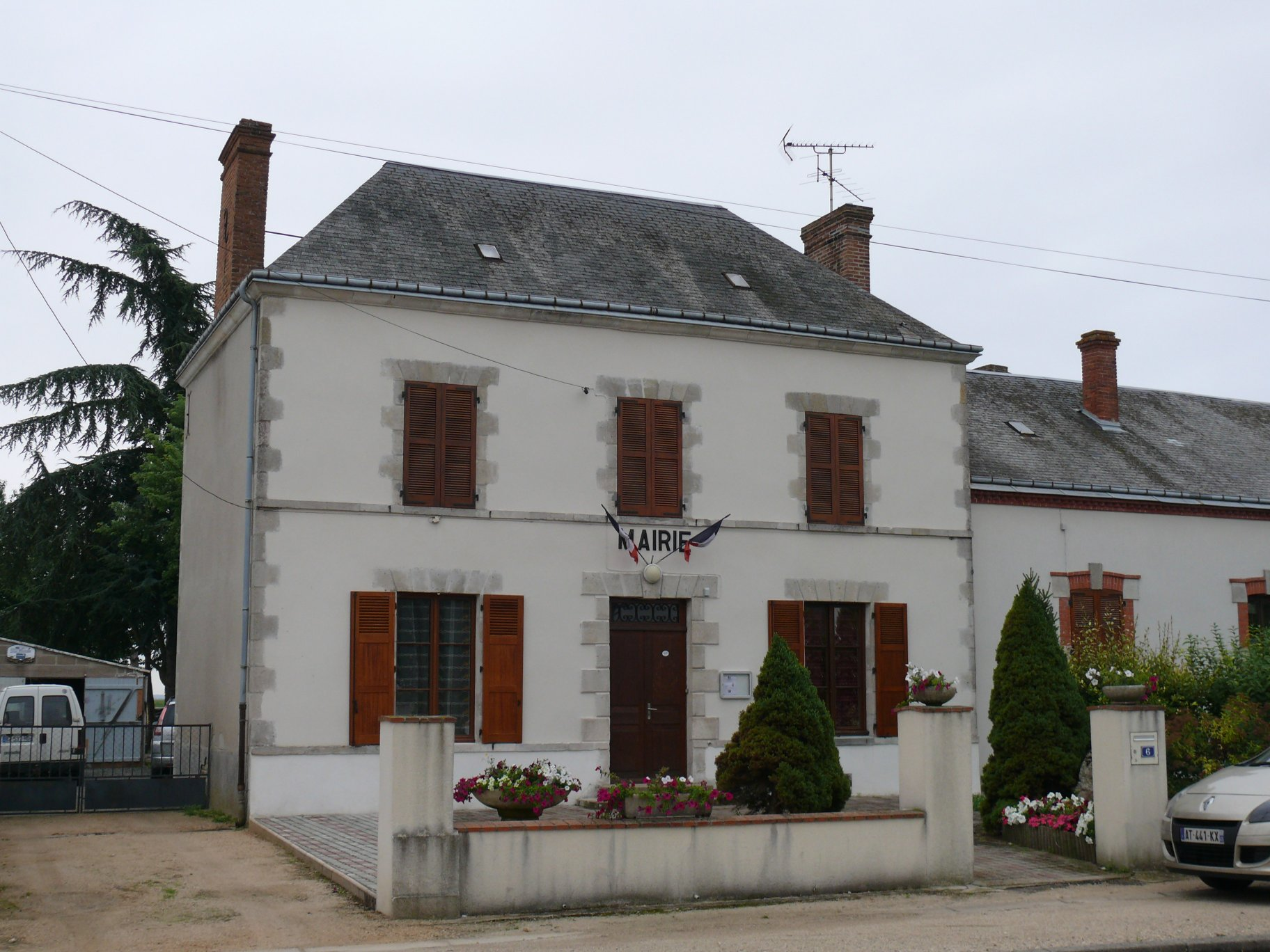
- Town hall
- Location of Bouzonville-aux-Bois
- Location within France Location within Centre-Val de Loire
- Coordinates: 48°06′14″N 2°14′08″E
- Country: France
- Region: Centre-Val de Loire
- Department: Loiret
- Arrondissement: Pithiviers
- Canton: Le Malesherbois

Government
  - Mayor (2020–2026): Francis Peron
- Area^{1}: 7.54 km^{2} (2.91 sq mi)
- Highest elevation: 118 m (387 ft)
- Lowest elevation: 108 m (354 ft)
- Population (2023): 428
  - Density: 56.8/km^{2} (147/sq mi)
- Time zone: UTC+01:00 (CET)
  - Summer (DST): UTC+02:00 (CEST)
- INSEE/Postal code: 45047 /45300
- ^{1} French Land Register data, which excludes lakes, ponds, glaciers > 1 km^{2} (0.386 sq mi or 247 acres) and river estuaries.

Bouzonville-aux-Bois (French pronunciation: [buzɔ̃vil o bwa]) is a commune in the Loiret department in north-central France.

== Population ==
Historical population
| Year | Pop. | ±% p.a. |
|---|---|---|
| 1968 | 215 | — |
| 1975 | 214 | −0.07% |
| 1982 | 273 | +3.54% |
| 1990 | 306 | +1.44% |
| 1999 | 344 | +1.31% |
| 2007 | 410 | +2.22% |
| 2012 | 435 | +1.19% |
| 2017 | 428 | −0.32% |
| 2023 | 428 | +0.00% |
Source: INSEE

== See also ==
- Communes of the Loiret department
