= Estouy =

- Commune
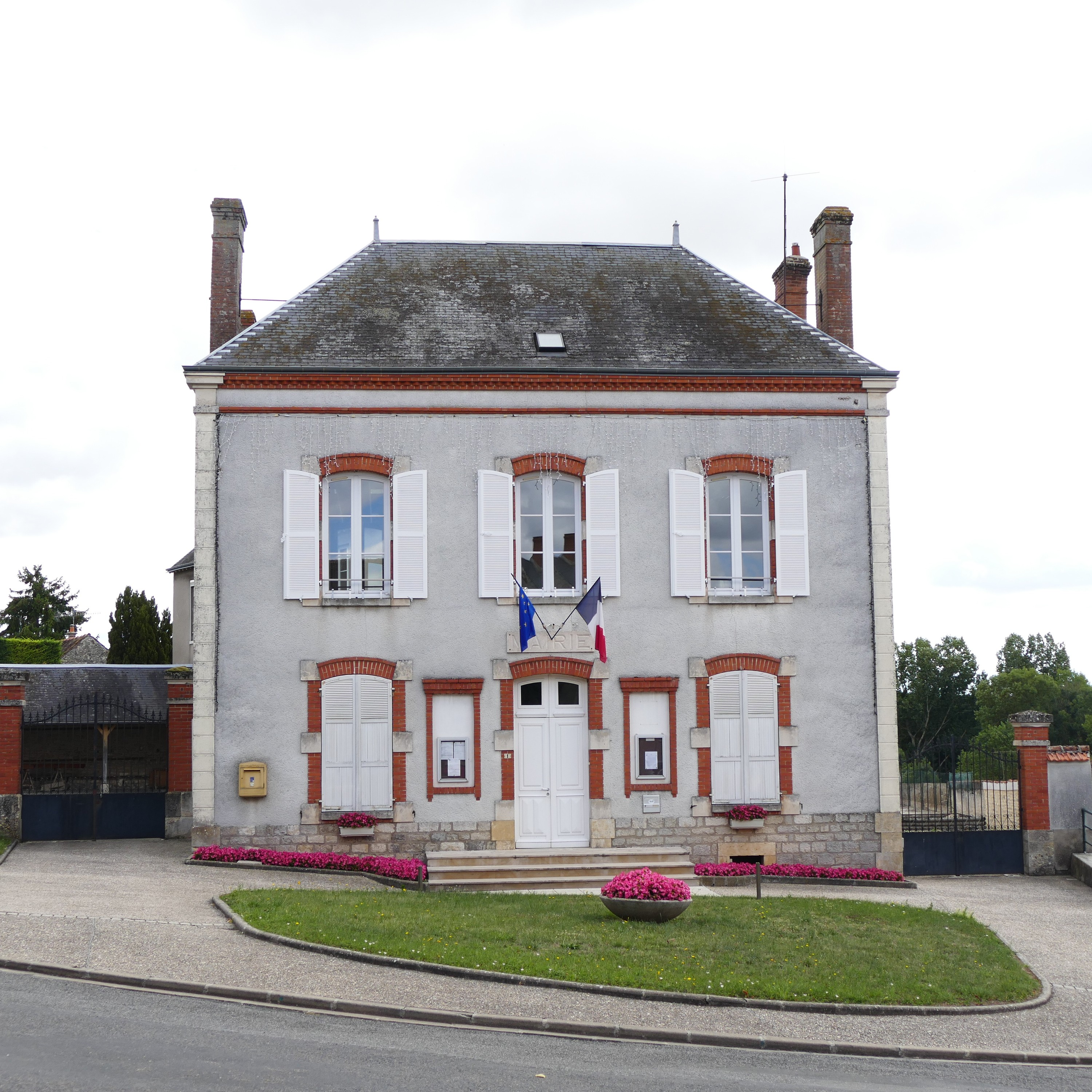
- Town hall
- Location of Estouy
- Location within France Location within Centre-Val de Loire
- Coordinates: 48°11′15″N 2°19′38″E
- Country: France
- Region: Centre-Val de Loire
- Department: Loiret
- Arrondissement: Pithiviers
- Canton: Le Malesherbois
- Intercommunality: Pithiverais

Government
  - Mayor (2020–2026): Anne-Jacques de Bouville
- Area^{1}: 18.07 km^{2} (6.98 sq mi)
- Highest elevation: 131 m (430 ft)
- Lowest elevation: 87 m (285 ft)
- Population (2023): 508
  - Density: 28.1/km^{2} (72.8/sq mi)
- Time zone: UTC+01:00 (CET)
  - Summer (DST): UTC+02:00 (CEST)
- INSEE/Postal code: 45139 /45300
- ^{1} French Land Register data, which excludes lakes, ponds, glaciers > 1 km^{2} (0.386 sq mi or 247 acres) and river estuaries.

Estouy (French pronunciation: [ɛstui]) is a commune in the Loiret department in north-central France.

== See also ==
- Communes of the Loiret department
