= Vrigny, Loiret =

Vrigny
- Commune
- Location of Vrigny
- Location within France Location within Centre-Val de Loire
- Coordinates: 48°04′54″N 2°14′38″E
- Country: France
- Region: Centre-Val de Loire
- Department: Loiret
- Arrondissement: Pithiviers
- Canton: Le Malesherbois
- Intercommunality: Pithiverais

Government
  - Mayor (2020–2026): Christian Blondel
- Area^{1}: 16.14 km^{2} (6.23 sq mi)
- Highest elevation: 168 m (551 ft)
- Lowest elevation: 108 m (354 ft)
- Population (2023): 786
  - Density: 48.7/km^{2} (126/sq mi)
- Time zone: UTC+01:00 (CET)
  - Summer (DST): UTC+02:00 (CEST)
- INSEE/Postal code: 45347 /45300
- ^{1} French Land Register data, which excludes lakes, ponds, glaciers > 1 km^{2} (0.386 sq mi or 247 acres) and river estuaries.

Vrigny (French pronunciation: [vʁiɲi]) is a commune in the Loiret department in north-central France.

== See also ==
- Communes of the Loiret department
