= Courcy-aux-Loges =

- Commune
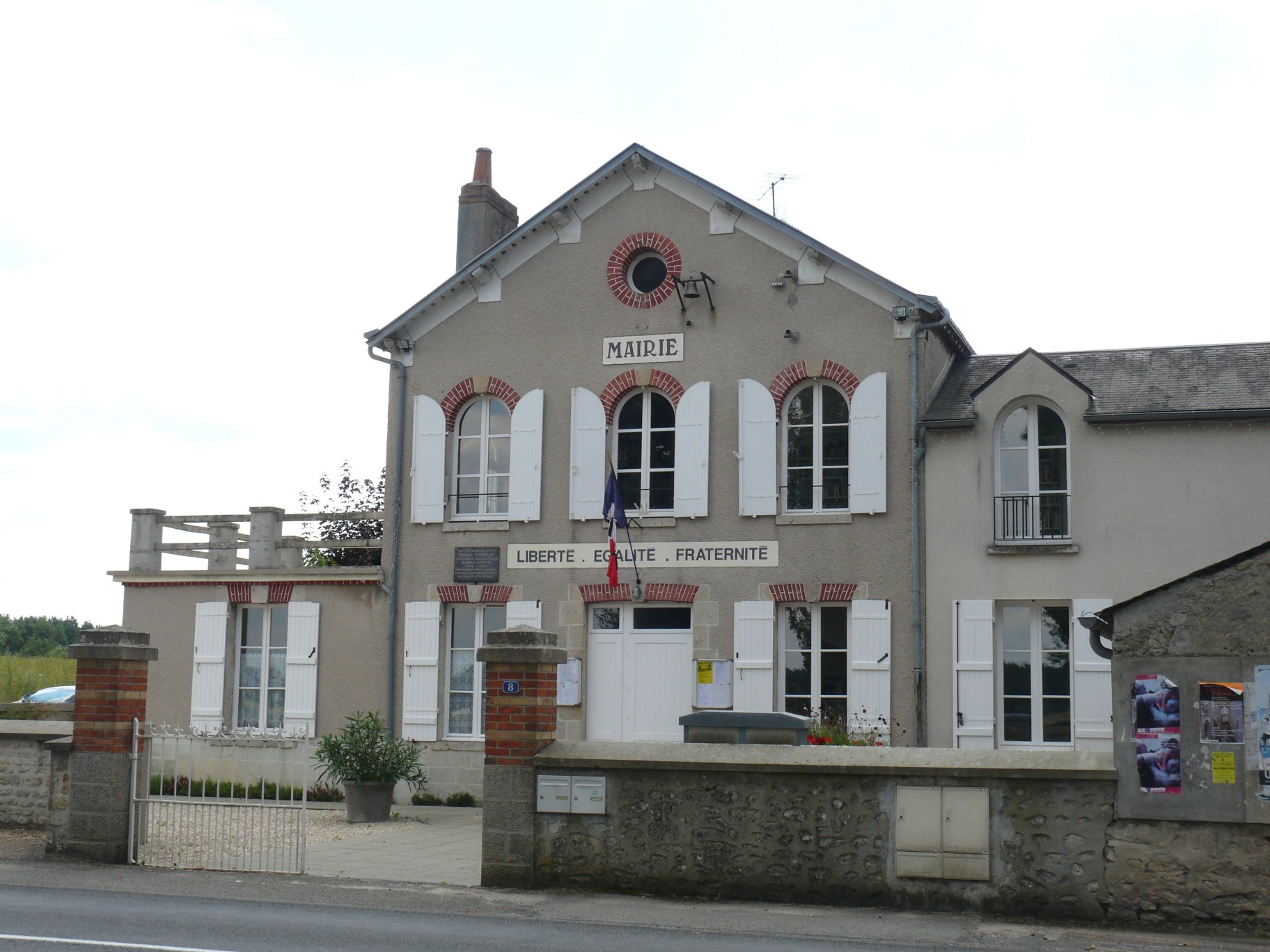
- Courcy-aux-Loges Town Hall

- Coat of arms
- Location of Courcy-aux-Loges
- Location within France Location within Centre-Val de Loire
- Coordinates: 48°03′55″N 2°12′48″E
- Country: France
- Region: Centre-Val de Loire
- Department: Loiret
- Arrondissement: Pithiviers
- Canton: Le Malesherbois
- Intercommunality: Pithiverais

Government
  - Mayor (2020–2026): Sandrine Fils
- Area^{1}: 20.90 km^{2} (8.07 sq mi)
- Highest elevation: 150 m (490 ft)
- Lowest elevation: 114 m (374 ft)
- Population (2023): 454
  - Density: 21.7/km^{2} (56.3/sq mi)
- Demonym: Courcéens
- Time zone: UTC+01:00 (CET)
  - Summer (DST): UTC+02:00 (CEST)
- INSEE/Postal code: 45111 /45300
- ^{1} French Land Register data, which excludes lakes, ponds, glaciers > 1 km^{2} (0.386 sq mi or 247 acres) and river estuaries.

Courcy-aux-Loges (French pronunciation: [kuʁsi o lɔʒ]) is a commune in the Loiret department in north-central France.

== See also ==
- Communes of the Loiret department
