= Givraines =

- Commune
- Coat of arms
- Location of Givraines
- Location within France Location within Centre-Val de Loire
- Coordinates: 48°08′57″N 2°22′08″E
- Country: France
- Region: Centre-Val de Loire
- Department: Loiret
- Arrondissement: Pithiviers
- Canton: Le Malesherbois
- Intercommunality: Pithiverais

Government
  - Mayor (2020–2026): Patrick Guérinet
- Area^{1}: 11.26 km^{2} (4.35 sq mi)
- Highest elevation: 127 m (417 ft)
- Lowest elevation: 95 m (312 ft)
- Population (2023): 423
  - Density: 37.6/km^{2} (97.3/sq mi)
- Demonym: Givrainois
- Time zone: UTC+01:00 (CET)
  - Summer (DST): UTC+02:00 (CEST)
- INSEE/Postal code: 45157 /45300
- ^{1} French Land Register data, which excludes lakes, ponds, glaciers > 1 km^{2} (0.386 sq mi or 247 acres) and river estuaries.

Givraines (French pronunciation: [ʒivʁɛn]) is a commune in the Loiret department in north-central France.

== See also ==
- Communes of the Loiret department
