= Engenville =

- Commune
- Coat of arms
- Location of Engenville
- Location within France Location within Centre-Val de Loire
- Coordinates: 48°14′20″N 2°14′48″E
- Country: France
- Region: Centre-Val de Loire
- Department: Loiret
- Arrondissement: Pithiviers
- Canton: Pithiviers
- Intercommunality: Pithiverais

Government
  - Mayor (2024–2026): Anita Davy
- Area^{1}: 18.10 km^{2} (6.99 sq mi)
- Highest elevation: 136 m (446 ft)
- Lowest elevation: 119 m (390 ft)
- Population (2023): 527
  - Density: 29.1/km^{2} (75.4/sq mi)
- Demonym: Engenvillois
- Time zone: UTC+01:00 (CET)
  - Summer (DST): UTC+02:00 (CEST)
- INSEE/Postal code: 45133 /45300
- Website: www.engenville.com
- ^{1} French Land Register data, which excludes lakes, ponds, glaciers > 1 km^{2} (0.386 sq mi or 247 acres) and river estuaries.

Engenville (French pronunciation: [ɑ̃ʒɑ̃vil]) is a commune in the Loiret department in north-central France.

== See also ==
- Communes of the Loiret department
