= Communes of the Loiret department =

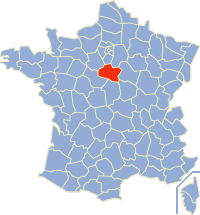

The following is the list of the 325 communes of the Loiret department of France.

The communes cooperate in the following intercommunalities (as of 2025):

- Orléans Métropole
- Communauté d'agglomération Montargoise et Rives du Loing
- Communauté de communes de la Beauce Loirétaine
- Communauté de communes Berry Loire Puisaye
- Communauté de communes Canaux et Forêts en Gâtinais
- Communauté de communes de la Cléry, du Betz et de l'Ouanne (partly)
- Communauté de communes de la Forêt
- Communauté de communes Giennoises
- Communauté de communes des Loges
- Communauté de communes du Pithiverais
- Communauté de communes du Pithiverais-Gâtinais
- Communauté de communes de la Plaine du Nord Loiret
- Communauté de communes des Portes de Sologne
- Communauté de communes des Quatre Vallées
- Communauté de communes des Terres du Val de Loire (partly)
- Communauté de communes du Val de Sully

INSEE	Postal	Commune
45001	45230	Adon
45002	45230	Aillant-sur-Milleron
45004	45200	Amilly
45005	45480	Andonville
45006	45160	Ardon
45008	45410	Artenay
45009	45170	Aschères-le-Marché
45010	45300	Ascoux
45011	45170	Attray
45012	45300	Audeville
45013	45330	Augerville-la-Rivière
45014	45390	Aulnay-la-Rivière
45015	45480	Autruy-sur-Juine
45016	45500	Autry-le-Châtel
45017	45270	Auvilliers-en-Gâtinais
45018	45340	Auxy
45019	45130	Baccon
45020	45130	Le Bardon
45021	45340	Barville-en-Gâtinais
45022	45340	Batilly-en-Gâtinais
45023	45420	Batilly-en-Puisaye
45024	45130	Baule
45025	45480	Bazoches-les-Gallerandes
45026	45210	Bazoches-sur-le-Betz
45027	45270	Beauchamps-sur-Huillard
45028	45190	Beaugency
45029	45630	Beaulieu-sur-Loire
45030	45340	Beaune-la-Rolande
45031	45270	Bellegarde
45032	45210	Le Bignon-Mirabeau
45033	45390	Boësses
45034	45760	Boigny-sur-Bionne
45035	45340	Boiscommun
45036	45290	Boismorand
45037	45480	Boisseaux
45038	45300	Bondaroy
45039	45460	Bonnée
45040	45420	Bonny-sur-Loire
45041	45340	Bordeaux-en-Gâtinais
45042	45460	Les Bordes
45043	45430	Bou
45044	45170	Bougy-lez-Neuville
45045	45300	Bouilly-en-Gâtinais
45046	45140	Boulay-les-Barres
45047	45300	Bouzonville-aux-Bois
45049	45460	Bouzy-la-Forêt
45050	45300	Boynes
45051	45460	Bray-Saint Aignan
45052	45250	Breteau
45053	45250	Briare
45054	45390	Briarres-sur-Essonne
45055	45310	Bricy
45056	45390	Bromeilles
45058	45410	Bucy-le-Roi
45059	45140	Bucy-Saint-Liphard
45060	45230	La Bussière
45061	45120	Cepoy
45062	45520	Cercottes
45063	45620	Cerdon
45064	45360	Cernoy-en-Berry
45065	45300	Césarville-Dossainville
45066	45260	Chailly-en-Gâtinais
45067	45380	Chaingy
45068	45120	Châlette-sur-Loing
45069	45340	Chambon-la-Forêt
45070	45420	Champoulet
45072	45400	Chanteau
45073	45320	Chantecoq
45074	45310	La Chapelle-Onzerain
45075	45380	La Chapelle-Saint-Mesmin
45076	45210	La Chapelle-Saint-Sépulcre
45077	45230	La Chapelle-sur-Aveyron
45078	45270	Chapelon
45079	45230	Le Charme
45080	45480	Charmont-en-Beauce
45081	45130	Charsonville
45082	45110	Châteauneuf-sur-Loire
45083	45220	Château-Renard
45084	45260	Châtenoy
45085	45230	Châtillon-Coligny
45086	45480	Châtillon-le-Roi
45087	45360	Châtillon-sur-Loire
45088	45480	Chaussy
45089	45430	Chécy
45091	45210	Chevannes
45092	45700	Chevillon-sur-Huillard
45093	45520	Chevilly
45094	45210	Chevry-sous-le-Bignon
45095	45170	Chilleurs-aux-Bois
45096	45290	Les Choux
45097	45220	Chuelles
45098	45370	Cléry-Saint-André
45099	45310	Coinces
45100	45800	Combleux
45101	45530	Combreux
45102	45700	Conflans-sur-Loing
45103	45490	Corbeilles
45104	45120	Corquilleroy
45105	45700	Cortrat
45107	45260	Coudroy
45108	45720	Coullons
45109	45130	Coulmiers
45110	45300	Courcelles-le-Roi
45111	45300	Courcy-aux-Loges
45112	45260	La Cour-Marigny
45113	45320	Courtemaux
45114	45490	Courtempierre
45115	45320	Courtenay
45116	45190	Cravant
45118	45170	Crottes-en-Pithiverais
45119	45300	Dadonville
45120	45420	Dammarie-en-Puisaye
45121	45230	Dammarie-sur-Loing
45122	45570	Dampierre-en-Burly
45123	45150	Darvoy
45124	45390	Desmonts
45125	45390	Dimancheville
45126	45450	Donnery
45127	45680	Dordives
45129	45220	Douchy-Montcorbon
45130	45370	Dry
45131	45390	Échilleuses
45132	45340	Égry
45133	45300	Engenville
45134	45130	Épieds-en-Beauce
45135	45480	Erceville
45136	45320	Ervauville
45137	45300	Escrennes
45138	45250	Escrignelles
45139	45300	Estouy
45141	45420	Faverelles
45142	45450	Fay-aux-Loges
45143	45230	Feins-en-Gâtinais
45144	45150	Férolles
45145	45210	Ferrières-en-Gâtinais
45146	45240	La Ferté-Saint-Aubin
45147	45400	Fleury-les-Aubrais
45148	45210	Fontenay-sur-Loing
45149	45320	Foucherolles
45150	45270	Fréville-du-Gâtinais
45151	45340	Gaubertin
45152	45310	Gémigny
45153	45110	Germigny-des-Prés
45154	45520	Gidy
45155	45500	Gien
45156	45120	Girolles
45157	45300	Givraines
45158	45490	Gondreville
45159	45390	Grangermont
45160	45480	Greneville-en-Beauce
45161	45210	Griselles
45162	45300	Guigneville
45164	45600	Guilly
45165	45220	Gy-les-Nonains
45166	45520	Huêtre
45167	45130	Huisseau-sur-Mauves
45168	45450	Ingrannes
45169	45140	Ingré
45170	45300	Intville-la-Guétard
45171	45620	Isdes
45173	45150	Jargeau
45174	45480	Jouy-en-Pithiverais
45175	45370	Jouy-le-Potier
45176	45340	Juranville
45177	45300	Laas

INSEE	Postal	Commune
45178	45270	Ladon
45179	45740	Lailly-en-Val
45180	45290	Langesse
45181	45480	Léouville
45182	45240	Ligny-le-Ribault
45183	45410	Lion-en-Beauce
45184	45600	Lion-en-Sullias
45185	45700	Lombreuil
45186	45490	Lorcy
45187	45260	Lorris
45188	45470	Loury
45189	45210	Louzouer
45191	45330	Le Malesherbois
45193	45240	Marcilly-en-Villette
45194	45430	Mardié
45195	45300	Mareau-aux-Bois
45196	45370	Mareau-aux-Prés
45197	45760	Marigny-les-Usages
45198	45300	Marsainvilliers
45199	45220	Melleroy
45200	45240	Ménestreau-en-Villette
45201	45210	Mérinville
45202	45190	Messas
45203	45130	Meung-sur-Loire
45205	45270	Mézières-en-Gâtinais
45204	45370	Mézières-lez-Cléry
45206	45490	Mignères
45207	45490	Mignerette
45208	45200	Montargis
45209	45340	Montbarrois
45210	45230	Montbouy
45212	45700	Montcresson
45213	45260	Montereau
45214	45170	Montigny
45215	45340	Montliard
45216	45700	Mormant-sur-Vernisson
45217	45300	Morville-en-Beauce
45218	45290	Le Moulinet-sur-Solin
45219	45270	Moulon
45220	45340	Nancray-sur-Rimarde
45222	45210	Nargis
45223	45270	Nesploy
45224	45170	Neuville-aux-Bois
45225	45390	La Neuville-sur-Essonne
45226	45510	Neuvy-en-Sullias
45227	45500	Nevoy
45228	45340	Nibelle
45229	45290	Nogent-sur-Vernisson
45230	45260	Noyers
45231	45170	Oison
45232	45160	Olivet
45233	45390	Ondreville-sur-Essonne
45234	45000	Orléans
45235	45140	Ormes
45237	45390	Orville
45238	45250	Ousson-sur-Loire
45239	45290	Oussoy-en-Gâtinais
45240	45480	Outarville
45241	45150	Ouvrouer-les-Champs
45242	45290	Ouzouer-des-Champs
45243	45270	Ouzouer-sous-Bellegarde
45244	45570	Ouzouer-sur-Loire
45245	45250	Ouzouer-sur-Trézée
45246	45300	Pannecières
45247	45700	Pannes
45248	45310	Patay
45249	45200	Paucourt
45250	45210	Pers-en-Gâtinais
45251	45360	Pierrefitte-ès-Bois
45252	45300	Pithiviers
45253	45300	Pithiviers-le-Vieil
45254	45500	Poilly-lez-Gien
45255	45490	Préfontaines
45256	45260	Presnoy
45257	45290	Pressigny-les-Pins
45258	45390	Puiseaux
45259	45270	Quiers-sur-Bézonde
45260	45300	Ramoulu
45261	45470	Rebréchien
45265	45210	Rozoy-le-Vieil
45262	45310	Rouvray-Sainte-Croix
45263	45300	Rouvres-Saint-Jean
45264	45130	Rozières-en-Beauce
45266	45410	Ruan
45268	45600	Saint-Aignan-le-Jaillard
45269	45130	Saint-Ay
45270	45730	Saint-Benoît-sur-Loire
45271	45500	Saint-Brisson-sur-Loire
45272	45590	Saint-Cyr-en-Val
45273	45550	Saint-Denis-de-l'Hôtel
45274	45560	Saint-Denis-en-Val
45278	45230	Sainte-Geneviève-des-Bois
45275	45220	Saint-Firmin-des-Bois
45276	45360	Saint-Firmin-sur-Loire
45277	45600	Saint-Florent-le-Jeune
45279	45220	Saint-Germain-des-Prés
45280	45500	Saint-Gondon
45281	45320	Saint-Hilaire-les-Andrésis
45282	45160	Saint-Hilaire-Saint-Mesmin
45283	45700	Saint-Hilaire-sur-Puiseaux
45284	45800	Saint-Jean-de-Braye
45285	45140	Saint-Jean-de-la-Ruelle
45286	45650	Saint-Jean-le-Blanc
45288	45340	Saint-Loup-des-Vignes
45289	45170	Saint-Lyé-la-Forêt
45290	45110	Saint-Martin-d'Abbat
45291	45500	Saint-Martin-sur-Ocre
45292	45230	Saint-Maurice-sur-Aveyron
45293	45700	Saint-Maurice-sur-Fessard
45294	45340	Saint-Michel
45296	45310	Saint-Péravy-la-Colombe
45297	45600	Saint-Père-sur-Loire
45298	45750	Saint-Pryvé-Saint-Mesmin
45299	45310	Saint-Sigismond
45300	45640	Sandillon
45301	45170	Santeau
45302	45770	Saran
45303	45490	Sceaux-du-Gâtinais
45305	45530	Seichebrières
45306	45210	La Selle-en-Hermoy
45307	45210	La Selle-sur-le-Bied
45308	45400	Semoy
45309	45240	Sennely
45310	45300	Sermaises
45311	45110	Sigloy
45312	45700	Solterre
45313	45410	Sougy
45314	45450	Sully-la-Chapelle
45315	45600	Sully-sur-Loire
45316	45530	Sury-aux-Bois
45317	45190	Tavers
45320	45300	Thignonville
45321	45260	Thimory
45322	45210	Thorailles
45323	45420	Thou
45324	45510	Tigy
45325	45170	Tivernon
45326	45310	Tournoisis
45327	45470	Traînou
45328	45490	Treilles-en-Gâtinais
45329	45220	Triguères
45330	45410	Trinay
45331	45510	Vannes-sur-Cosson
45332	45290	Varennes-Changy
45333	45760	Vennecy
45334	45260	Vieilles-Maisons-sur-Joudry
45335	45510	Vienne-en-Val
45336	45600	Viglain
45337	45310	Villamblain
45338	45700	Villemandeur
45339	45270	Villemoutiers
45340	45600	Villemurlin
45341	45310	Villeneuve-sur-Conie
45342	45170	Villereau
45343	45700	Villevoques
45344	45190	Villorceau
45345	45700	Vimory
45346	45530	Vitry-aux-Loges
45347	45300	Vrigny
45348	45300	Yèvre-la-Ville
