= Attray =

- Commune
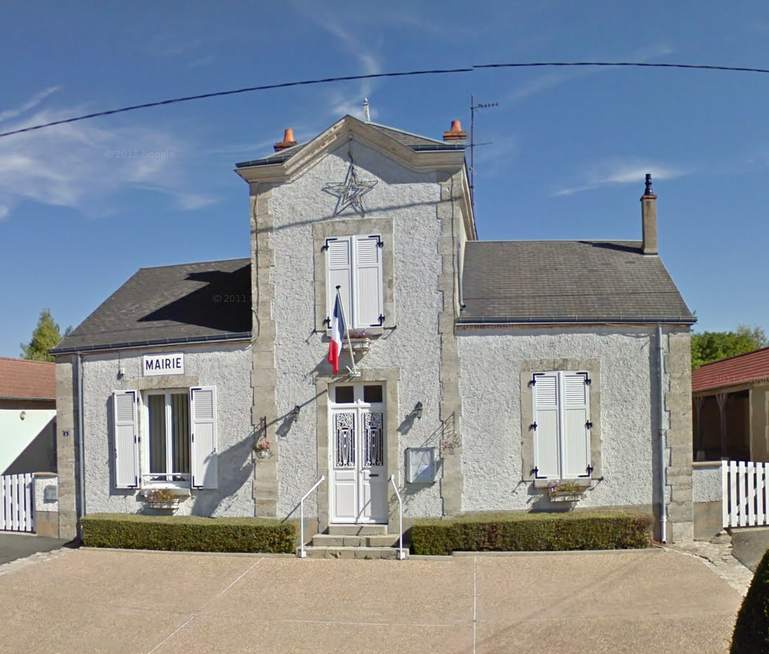
- Attray Town hall

- Coat of arms
- Location of Attray
- Location within France Location within Centre-Val de Loire
- Coordinates: 48°07′23″N 2°06′46″E
- Country: France
- Region: Centre-Val de Loire
- Department: Loiret
- Arrondissement: Pithiviers
- Canton: Pithiviers
- Intercommunality: CC Plaine Nord Loiret

Government
  - Mayor (2020–2026): Dominique Gaucher
- Area^{1}: 16.74 km^{2} (6.46 sq mi)
- Highest elevation: 137 m (449 ft)
- Lowest elevation: 105 m (344 ft)
- Population (2023): 208
  - Density: 12.4/km^{2} (32.2/sq mi)
- Time zone: UTC+01:00 (CET)
  - Summer (DST): UTC+02:00 (CEST)
- INSEE/Postal code: 45011 /45170
- ^{1} French Land Register data, which excludes lakes, ponds, glaciers > 1 km^{2} (0.386 sq mi or 247 acres) and river estuaries.

Attray (French pronunciation: [atʁɛ]) is a commune in the Loiret department in north-central France.

== Population ==
Historical population
Year	Pop.	±% p.a.
1968	217	—
1975	192	−1.73%
1982	206	+1.01%
1990	198	−0.49%
1999	195	−0.17%
2007	209	+0.87%
2012	216	+0.66%
2017	211	−0.47%
2023	208	−0.24%
Source: INSEE

== See also ==
- Communes of the Loiret department
