= Mareau-aux-Bois =

- Commune
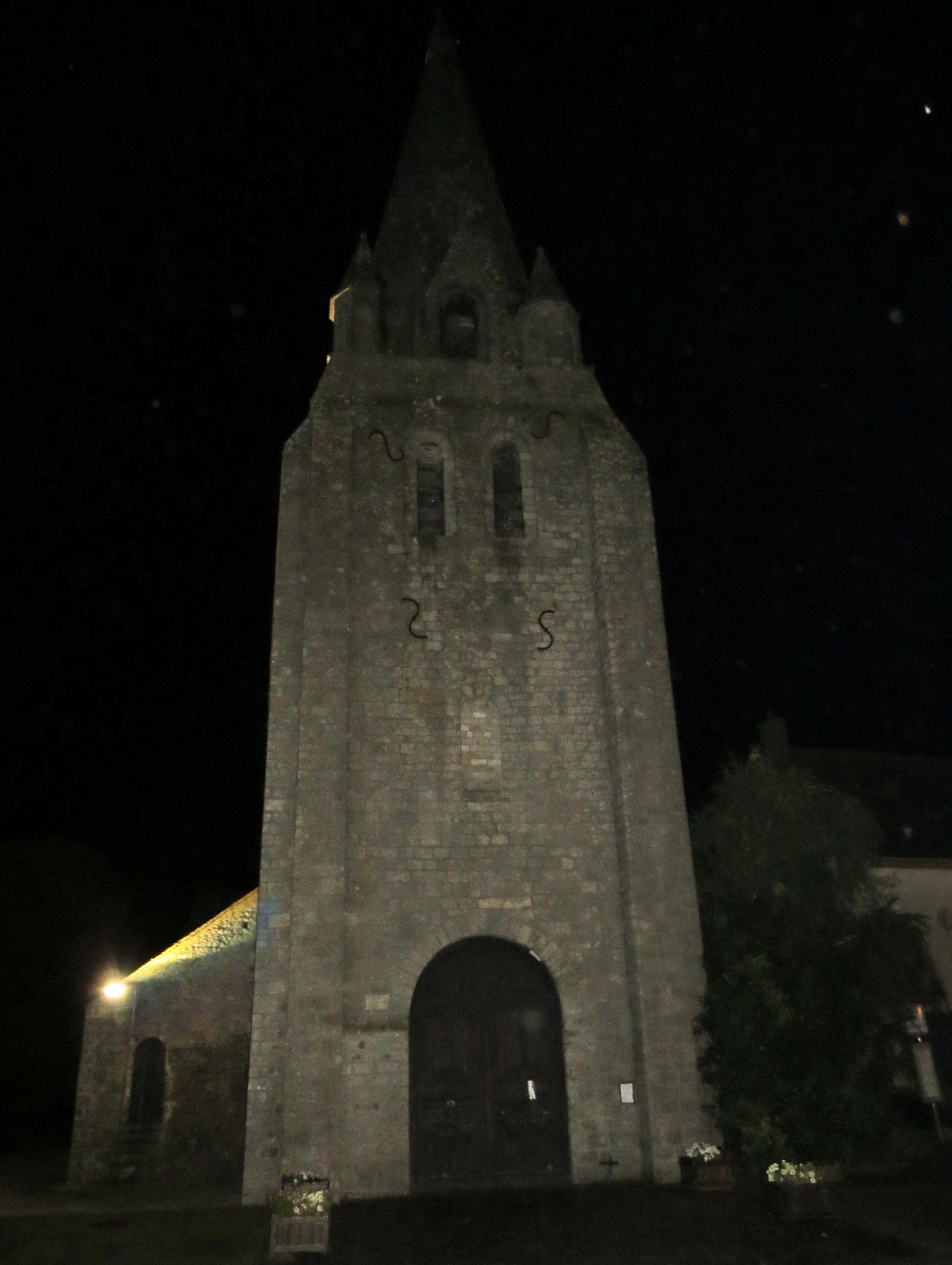
- The church in Mareau-aux-Bois, at night
- Location of Mareau-aux-Bois
- Location within France Location within Centre-Val de Loire
- Coordinates: 48°06′08″N 2°11′24″E
- Country: France
- Region: Centre-Val de Loire
- Department: Loiret
- Arrondissement: Pithiviers
- Canton: Le Malesherbois
- Intercommunality: Pithiverais

Government
  - Mayor (2020–2026): Isabelle Rouvreau
- Area^{1}: 11.61 km^{2} (4.48 sq mi)
- Highest elevation: 122 m (400 ft)
- Lowest elevation: 107 m (351 ft)
- Population (2023): 570
  - Density: 49/km^{2} (130/sq mi)
- Time zone: UTC+01:00 (CET)
  - Summer (DST): UTC+02:00 (CEST)
- INSEE/Postal code: 45195 /45300
- ^{1} French Land Register data, which excludes lakes, ponds, glaciers > 1 km^{2} (0.386 sq mi or 247 acres) and river estuaries.

Mareau-aux-Bois (French pronunciation: [maʁo o bwa]) is a commune in the Loiret department in north-central France.

== See also ==
- Communes of the Loiret department
