= Laas, Loiret =

Laas
- Commune
- Coat of arms
- Location of Laas
- Location within France Location within Centre-Val de Loire
- Coordinates: 48°07′15″N 2°13′05″E
- Country: France
- Region: Centre-Val de Loire
- Department: Loiret
- Arrondissement: Pithiviers
- Canton: Le Malesherbois
- Intercommunality: Pithiverais

Government
  - Mayor (2023–2026): Corinne Coquil
- Area^{1}: 6.60 km^{2} (2.55 sq mi)
- Highest elevation: 119 m (390 ft)
- Lowest elevation: 112 m (367 ft)
- Population (2023): 243
  - Density: 36.8/km^{2} (95.4/sq mi)
- Demonym: Légatiens
- Time zone: UTC+01:00 (CET)
  - Summer (DST): UTC+02:00 (CEST)
- INSEE/Postal code: 45177 /45300
- ^{1} French Land Register data, which excludes lakes, ponds, glaciers > 1 km^{2} (0.386 sq mi or 247 acres) and river estuaries.

Laas is a commune in the Loiret department in north-central France.

== See also ==
- Communes of the Loiret department
