= Léouville =

- Commune
- Location of Léouville
- Location within France Location within Centre-Val de Loire
- Coordinates: 48°13′27″N 2°05′19″E
- Country: France
- Region: Centre-Val de Loire
- Department: Loiret
- Arrondissement: Pithiviers
- Canton: Pithiviers
- Intercommunality: CC Plaine du Nord Loiret

Government
  - Mayor (2020–2026): Christine Petit
- Area^{1}: 4.28 km^{2} (1.65 sq mi)
- Highest elevation: 136 m (446 ft)
- Lowest elevation: 117 m (384 ft)
- Population (2023): 85
  - Density: 20/km^{2} (51/sq mi)
- Time zone: UTC+01:00 (CET)
  - Summer (DST): UTC+02:00 (CEST)
- INSEE/Postal code: 45181 /45480
- ^{1} French Land Register data, which excludes lakes, ponds, glaciers > 1 km^{2} (0.386 sq mi or 247 acres) and river estuaries.

Léouville (French pronunciation: [le.uvil]) is a commune in the Loiret department in north-central France.

== See also ==
- Communes of the Loiret department
