= Thignonville =

- Commune
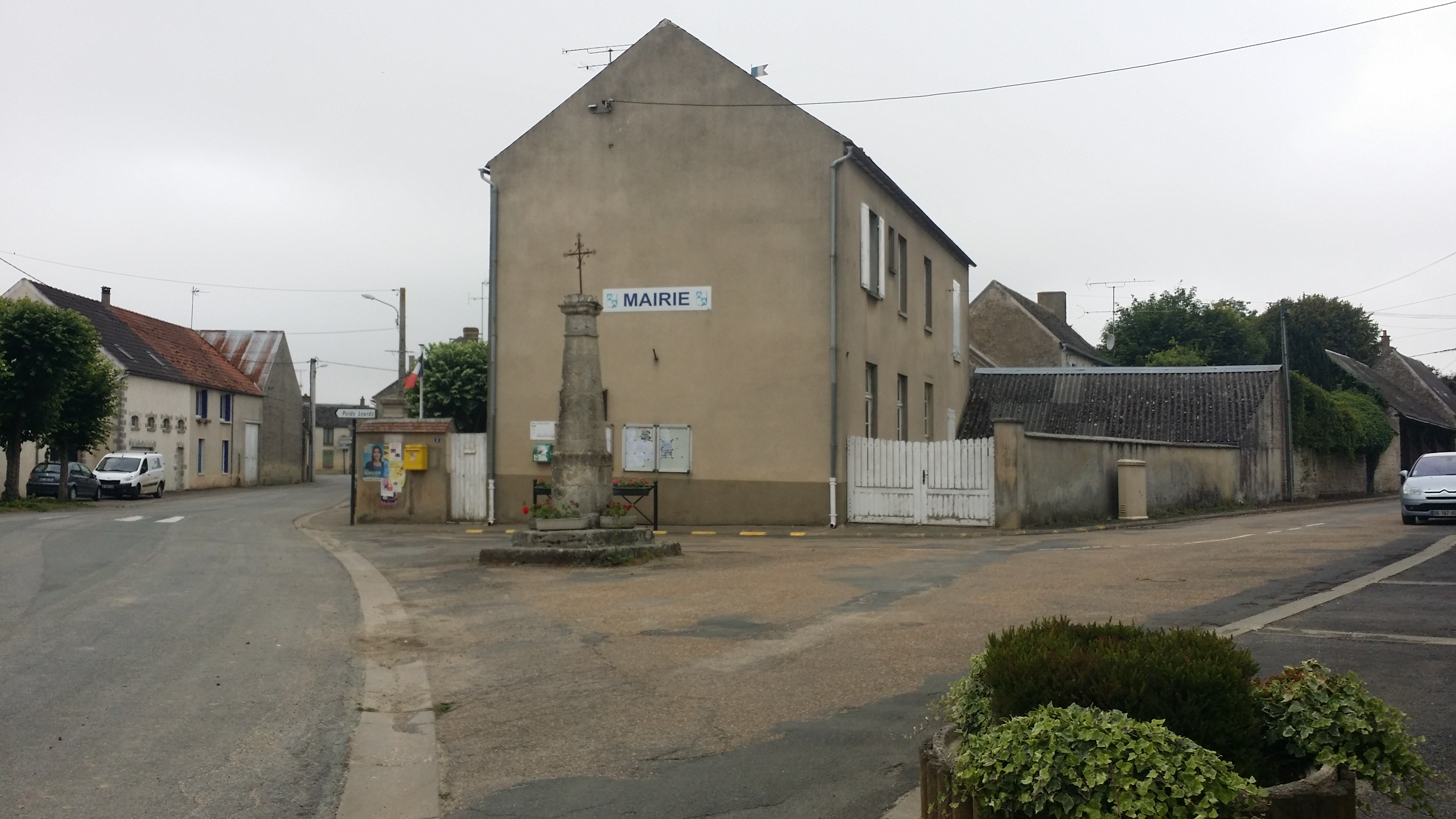
- Thignonville Town Hall

- Coat of arms
- Location of Thignonville
- Location within France Location within Centre-Val de Loire
- Coordinates: 48°16′54″N 2°10′27″E
- Country: France
- Region: Centre-Val de Loire
- Department: Loiret
- Arrondissement: Pithiviers
- Canton: Pithiviers
- Intercommunality: Pithiverais

Government
  - Mayor (2020–2026): José Pierquin
- Area^{1}: 9.16 km^{2} (3.54 sq mi)
- Highest elevation: 132 m (433 ft)
- Lowest elevation: 112 m (367 ft)
- Population (2023): 372
  - Density: 40.6/km^{2} (105/sq mi)
- Time zone: UTC+01:00 (CET)
  - Summer (DST): UTC+02:00 (CEST)
- INSEE/Postal code: 45320 /45300
- ^{1} French Land Register data, which excludes lakes, ponds, glaciers > 1 km^{2} (0.386 sq mi or 247 acres) and river estuaries.

Thignonville (French pronunciation: [tiɲɔ̃vil]) is a commune in the Loiret department in north-central France.

== See also ==
- Communes of the Loiret department
