= Bouilly-en-Gâtinais =

- Commune
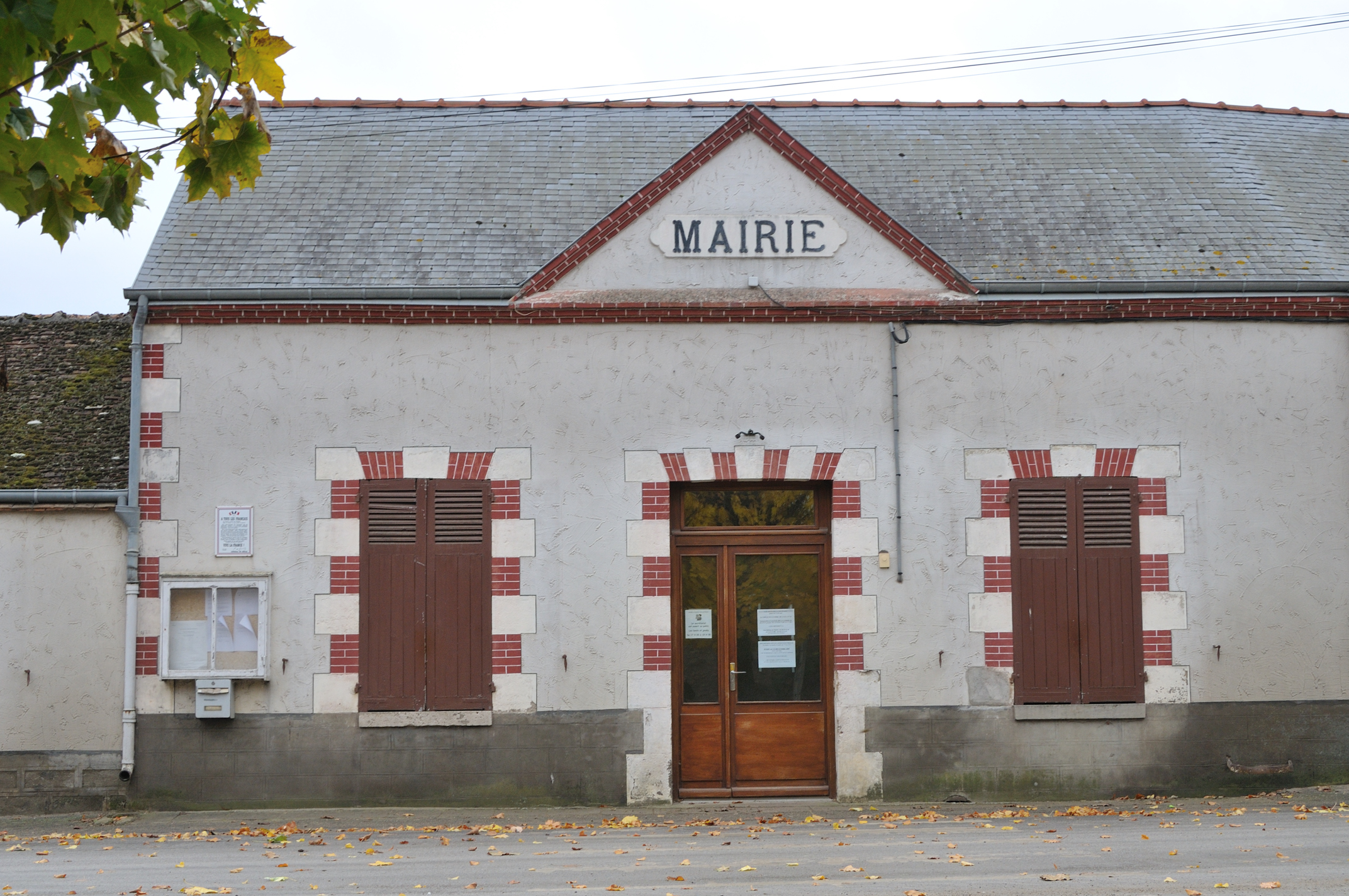
- The town hall in Bouilly-en-Gâtinais

- Coat of arms
- Location of Bouilly-en-Gâtinais
- Location within France Location within Centre-Val de Loire
- Coordinates: 48°05′46″N 2°17′07″E
- Country: France
- Region: Centre-Val de Loire
- Department: Loiret
- Arrondissement: Pithiviers
- Canton: Le Malesherbois
- Intercommunality: Pithiverais

Government
  - Mayor (2020–2026): Philippe Verneau
- Area^{1}: 15.96 km^{2} (6.16 sq mi)
- Highest elevation: 122 m (400 ft)
- Lowest elevation: 98 m (322 ft)
- Population (2023): 304
  - Density: 19.0/km^{2} (49.3/sq mi)
- Time zone: UTC+01:00 (CET)
  - Summer (DST): UTC+02:00 (CEST)
- INSEE/Postal code: 45045 /45300
- ^{1} French Land Register data, which excludes lakes, ponds, glaciers > 1 km^{2} (0.386 sq mi or 247 acres) and river estuaries.

Bouilly-en-Gâtinais (French pronunciation: [buji ɑ̃ ɡatinɛ], literally Bouilly in Gâtinais) is a commune in the Loiret department in north-central France.

== Population ==
Historical population
Year	Pop.	±% p.a.
1968	247	—
1975	261	+0.79%
1982	277	+0.85%
1990	260	−0.79%
1999	302	+1.68%
2007	316	+0.57%
2012	358	+2.53%
2017	319	−2.28%
2023	304	−0.80%
Source: INSEE

== See also ==
- Communes of the Loiret department
