= Ascoux =

- Commune
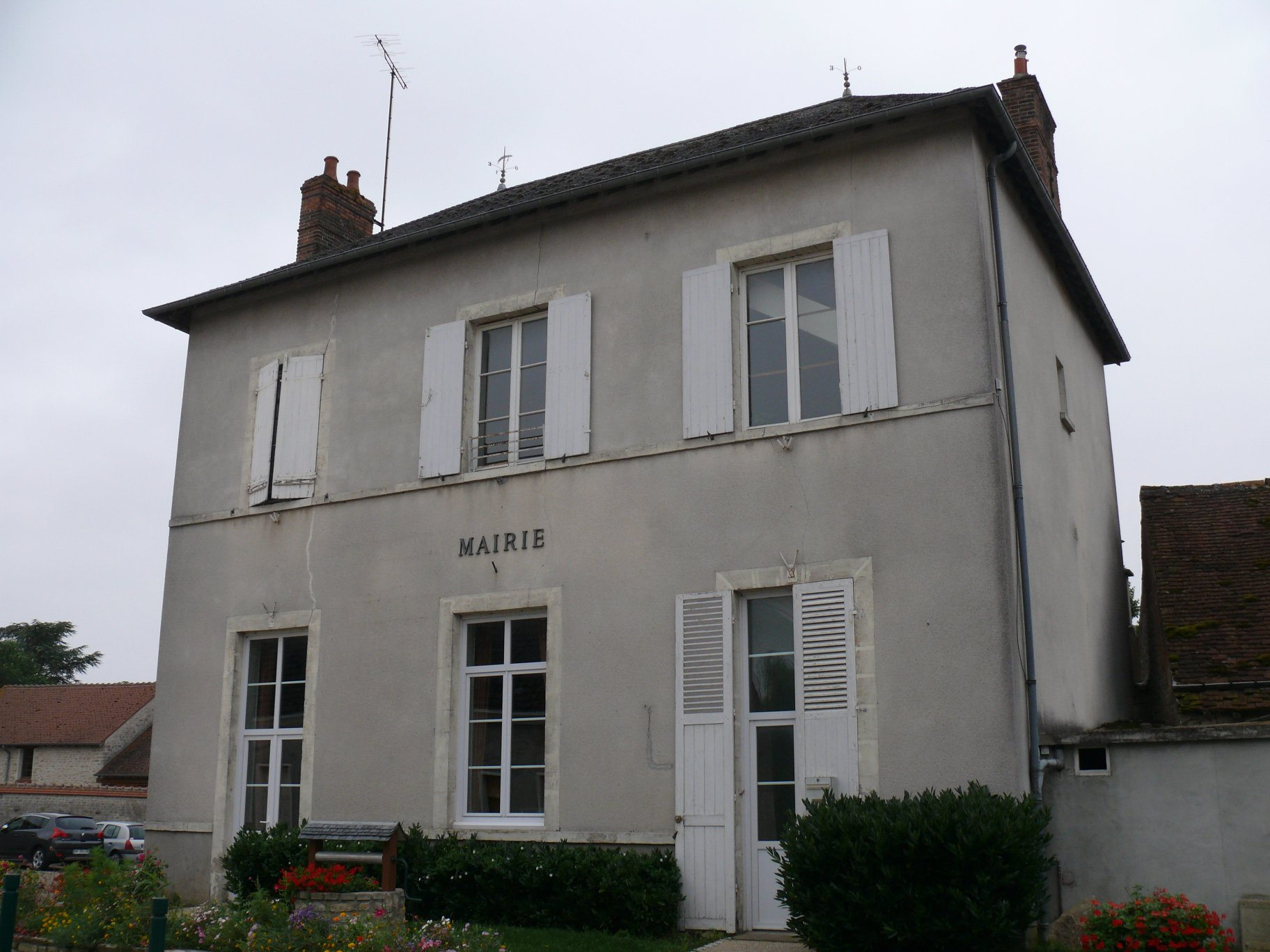
- Ascoux Town hall

- Coat of arms
- Location of Ascoux
- Location within France Location within Centre-Val de Loire
- Coordinates: 48°07′45″N 2°14′55″E
- Country: France
- Region: Centre-Val de Loire
- Department: Loiret
- Arrondissement: Pithiviers
- Canton: Le Malesherbois
- Intercommunality: CC Pithiverais

Government
  - Mayor (2020–2026): Brigitte Barrault
- Area^{1}: 6.75 km^{2} (2.61 sq mi)
- Highest elevation: 121 m (397 ft)
- Lowest elevation: 107 m (351 ft)
- Population (2023): 1,062
  - Density: 157/km^{2} (407/sq mi)
- Time zone: UTC+01:00 (CET)
  - Summer (DST): UTC+02:00 (CEST)
- INSEE/Postal code: 45010 /45300
- ^{1} French Land Register data, which excludes lakes, ponds, glaciers > 1 km^{2} (0.386 sq mi or 247 acres) and river estuaries.

Ascoux (French pronunciation: [asku]) is a commune in the Loiret department in north-central France.

== Population ==
Historical population
| Year | Pop. | ±% p.a. |
|---|---|---|
| 1968 | 469 | — |
| 1975 | 478 | +0.27% |
| 1982 | 548 | +1.97% |
| 1990 | 689 | +2.90% |
| 1999 | 787 | +1.49% |
| 2007 | 838 | +0.79% |
| 2012 | 960 | +2.76% |
| 2017 | 1,164 | +3.93% |
| 2023 | 1,062 | −1.52% |
Source: INSEE

== See also ==
- Communes of the Loiret department
