= Outarville =

- Commune
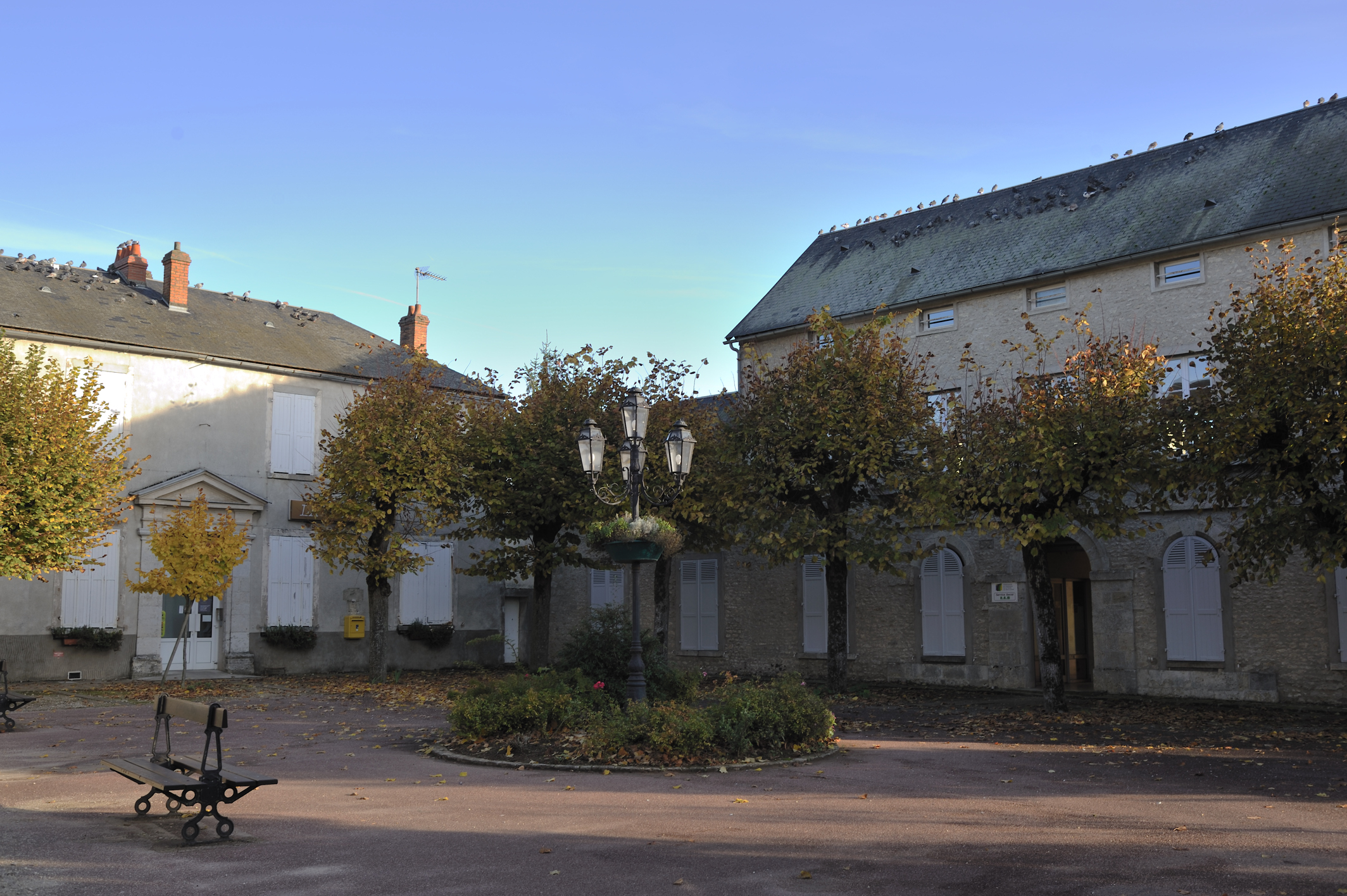
- The old marketplace in Outarville

- Coat of arms
- Location of Outarville
- Location within France Location within Centre-Val de Loire
- Coordinates: 48°12′41″N 2°01′14″E
- Country: France
- Region: Centre-Val de Loire
- Department: Loiret
- Arrondissement: Pithiviers
- Canton: Pithiviers
- Intercommunality: Plaine du Nord Loiret

Government
  - Mayor (2020–2026): Michel Chambrin
- Area^{1}: 46.61 km^{2} (18.00 sq mi)
- Highest elevation: 139 m (456 ft)
- Lowest elevation: 120 m (390 ft)
- Population (2023): 1,343
  - Density: 28.81/km^{2} (74.63/sq mi)
- Demonym: Outarvillois
- Time zone: UTC+01:00 (CET)
  - Summer (DST): UTC+02:00 (CEST)
- INSEE/Postal code: 45240 /45480
- Website: www.mairie-outarville.fr
- ^{1} French Land Register data, which excludes lakes, ponds, glaciers > 1 km^{2} (0.386 sq mi or 247 acres) and river estuaries.

Outarville (French pronunciation: [utaʁvil]) is a commune in the Loiret department in north-central France. In 1973 it absorbed the former communes Allainville-en-Beauce, Faronville, Saint-Péravy-Epreux and Teillay-le-Gaudin.

== See also ==
- Communes of the Loiret department
