= Escrennes =

- Commune
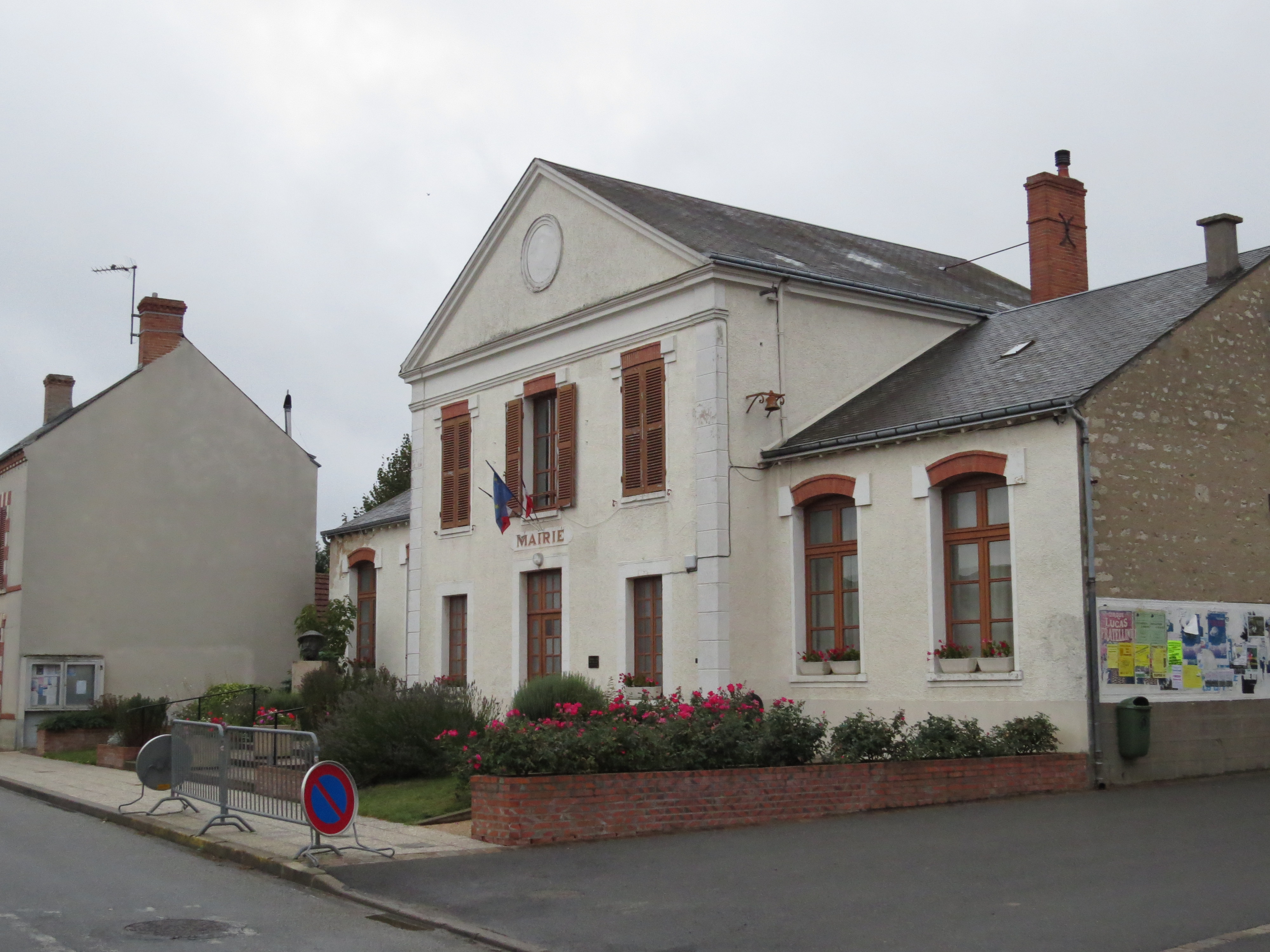
- The town hall in Escrennes

- Coat of arms
- Location of Escrennes
- Location within France Location within Centre-Val de Loire
- Coordinates: 48°08′02″N 2°11′22″E
- Country: France
- Region: Centre-Val de Loire
- Department: Loiret
- Arrondissement: Pithiviers
- Canton: Le Malesherbois
- Intercommunality: Pithiverais

Government
  - Mayor (2020–2026): Denis Lenoble
- Area^{1}: 11.55 km^{2} (4.46 sq mi)
- Highest elevation: 123 m (404 ft)
- Lowest elevation: 102 m (335 ft)
- Population (2023): 697
  - Density: 60.3/km^{2} (156/sq mi)
- Demonym: Escrennois
- Time zone: UTC+01:00 (CET)
  - Summer (DST): UTC+02:00 (CEST)
- INSEE/Postal code: 45137 /45300
- ^{1} French Land Register data, which excludes lakes, ponds, glaciers > 1 km^{2} (0.386 sq mi or 247 acres) and river estuaries.

Escrennes (French pronunciation: [ɛskʁɛn]) is a commune in the Loiret department in north-central France. As of 2018, its population was 744.

== See also ==
- Communes of the Loiret department
