= Oison =

- Commune
- Coat of arms
- Location of Oison
- Location within France Location within Centre-Val de Loire
- Coordinates: 48°08′18″N 1°58′07″E
- Country: France
- Region: Centre-Val de Loire
- Department: Loiret
- Arrondissement: Pithiviers
- Canton: Pithiviers
- Intercommunality: CC Plaine du Nord Loiret

Government
  - Mayor (2023–2026): Sophie Regniez
- Area^{1}: 12.09 km^{2} (4.67 sq mi)
- Highest elevation: 139 m (456 ft)
- Lowest elevation: 122 m (400 ft)
- Population (2023): 120
  - Density: 9.9/km^{2} (26/sq mi)
- Demonym: Oisonnais
- Time zone: UTC+01:00 (CET)
  - Summer (DST): UTC+02:00 (CEST)
- INSEE/Postal code: 45231 /45170
- ^{1} French Land Register data, which excludes lakes, ponds, glaciers > 1 km^{2} (0.386 sq mi or 247 acres) and river estuaries.

Oison (French pronunciation: [wazɔ̃]) is a commune in the Loiret department in north-central France.

== See also ==
- Communes of the Loiret department
