= Ramoulu =

- Commune
- Location of Ramoulu
- Location within France Location within Centre-Val de Loire
- Coordinates: 48°13′34″N 2°17′38″E
- Country: France
- Region: Centre-Val de Loire
- Department: Loiret
- Arrondissement: Pithiviers
- Canton: Le Malesherbois
- Intercommunality: Pithiverais

Government
  - Mayor (2020–2026): Martine Poincloux
- Area^{1}: 11.96 km^{2} (4.62 sq mi)
- Highest elevation: 135 m (443 ft)
- Lowest elevation: 91 m (299 ft)
- Population (2023): 241
  - Density: 20.2/km^{2} (52.2/sq mi)
- Time zone: UTC+01:00 (CET)
  - Summer (DST): UTC+02:00 (CEST)
- INSEE/Postal code: 45260 /45300
- ^{1} French Land Register data, which excludes lakes, ponds, glaciers > 1 km^{2} (0.386 sq mi or 247 acres) and river estuaries.

Ramoulu (French pronunciation: [ʁamuly]) is a commune in the Loiret department in north-central France.

== See also ==
- Communes of the Loiret department
