= Bondaroy =

- Commune
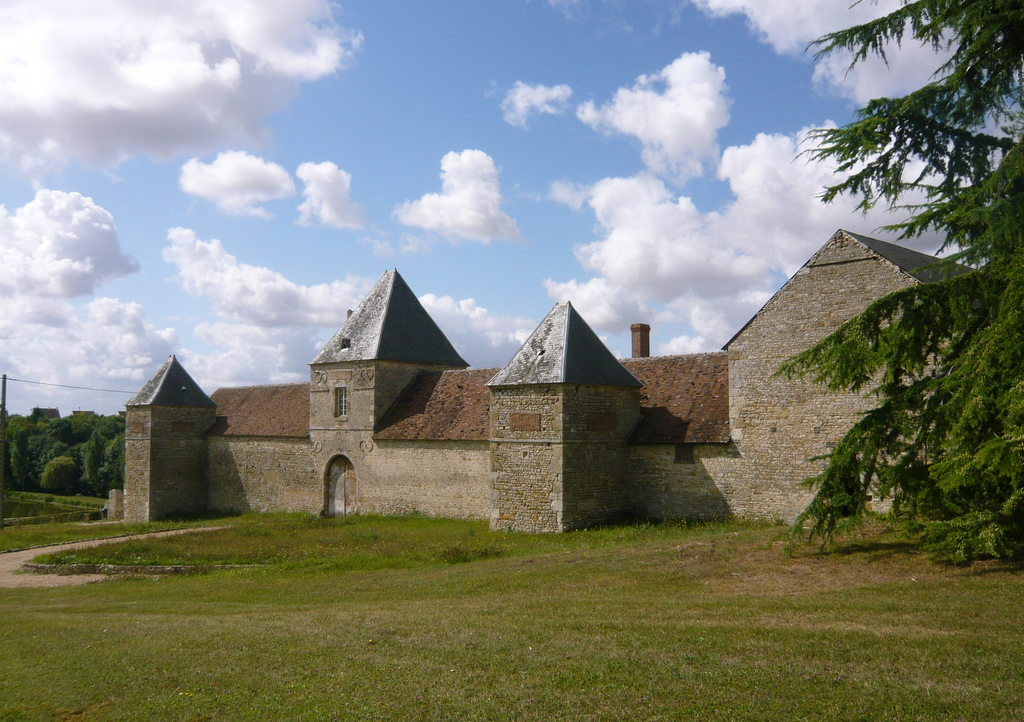
- The manor in Bondaroy
- Location of Bondaroy
- Location within France Location within Centre-Val de Loire
- Coordinates: 48°10′37″N 2°16′37″E
- Country: France
- Region: Centre-Val de Loire
- Department: Loiret
- Arrondissement: Pithiviers
- Canton: Le Malesherbois
- Intercommunality: Pithiverais

Government
  - Mayor (2020–2026): Sylvie Villette
- Area^{1}: 6.94 km^{2} (2.68 sq mi)
- Highest elevation: 129 m (423 ft)
- Lowest elevation: 95 m (312 ft)
- Population (2023): 411
  - Density: 59.2/km^{2} (153/sq mi)
- Time zone: UTC+01:00 (CET)
  - Summer (DST): UTC+02:00 (CEST)
- INSEE/Postal code: 45038 /45300
- ^{1} French Land Register data, which excludes lakes, ponds, glaciers > 1 km^{2} (0.386 sq mi or 247 acres) and river estuaries.

Bondaroy (French pronunciation: [bɔ̃daʁwa]) is a commune in the Loiret department in north-central France.

== Population ==
Historical population
| Year | Pop. | ±% p.a. |
|---|---|---|
| 1968 | 271 | — |
| 1975 | 316 | +2.22% |
| 1982 | 323 | +0.31% |
| 1990 | 347 | +0.90% |
| 1999 | 361 | +0.44% |
| 2007 | 388 | +0.91% |
| 2012 | 401 | +0.66% |
| 2017 | 412 | +0.54% |
| 2023 | 411 | −0.04% |
Source: INSEE

== See also ==
- Communes of the Loiret department
