= Batilly-en-Gâtinais =

- Commune
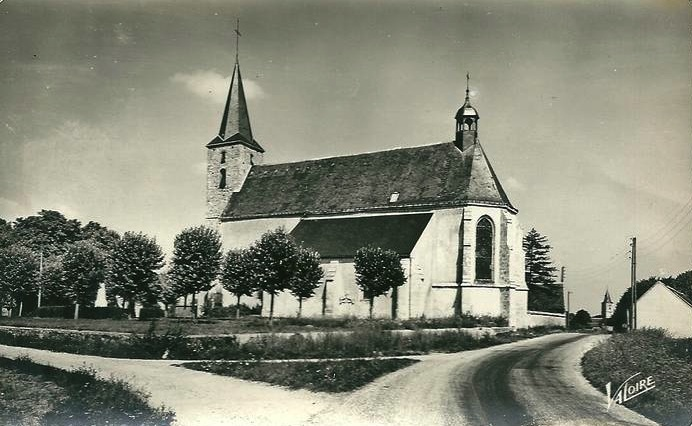
- An old view of the church in Batilly-en-Gâtinais

- Coat of arms
- Location of Batilly-en-Gâtinais
- Location within France Location within Centre-Val de Loire
- Coordinates: 48°04′28″N 2°22′54″E
- Country: France
- Region: Centre-Val de Loire
- Department: Loiret
- Arrondissement: Pithiviers
- Canton: Le Malesherbois

Government
  - Mayor (2020–2026): Claude Girard
- Area^{1}: 10.32 km^{2} (3.98 sq mi)
- Highest elevation: 120 m (390 ft)
- Lowest elevation: 106 m (348 ft)
- Population (2023): 447
  - Density: 43.3/km^{2} (112/sq mi)
- Time zone: UTC+01:00 (CET)
  - Summer (DST): UTC+02:00 (CEST)
- INSEE/Postal code: 45022 /45340
- ^{1} French Land Register data, which excludes lakes, ponds, glaciers > 1 km^{2} (0.386 sq mi or 247 acres) and river estuaries.

Batilly-en-Gâtinais (French pronunciation: [batiji ɑ̃ ɡɑtinɛ]; literally "Batilly in Gâtinais") is a commune in the Loiret department in north-central France.

== Population ==
Historical population
Year	Pop.	±% p.a.
1968	395	—
1975	328	−2.62%
1982	302	−1.17%
1990	309	+0.29%
1999	350	+1.39%
2007	397	+1.59%
2012	411	+0.70%
2017	458	+2.19%
2023	447	−0.40%
Source: INSEE

== See also ==
- Communes of the Loiret department
