= Boiscommun =

- Commune
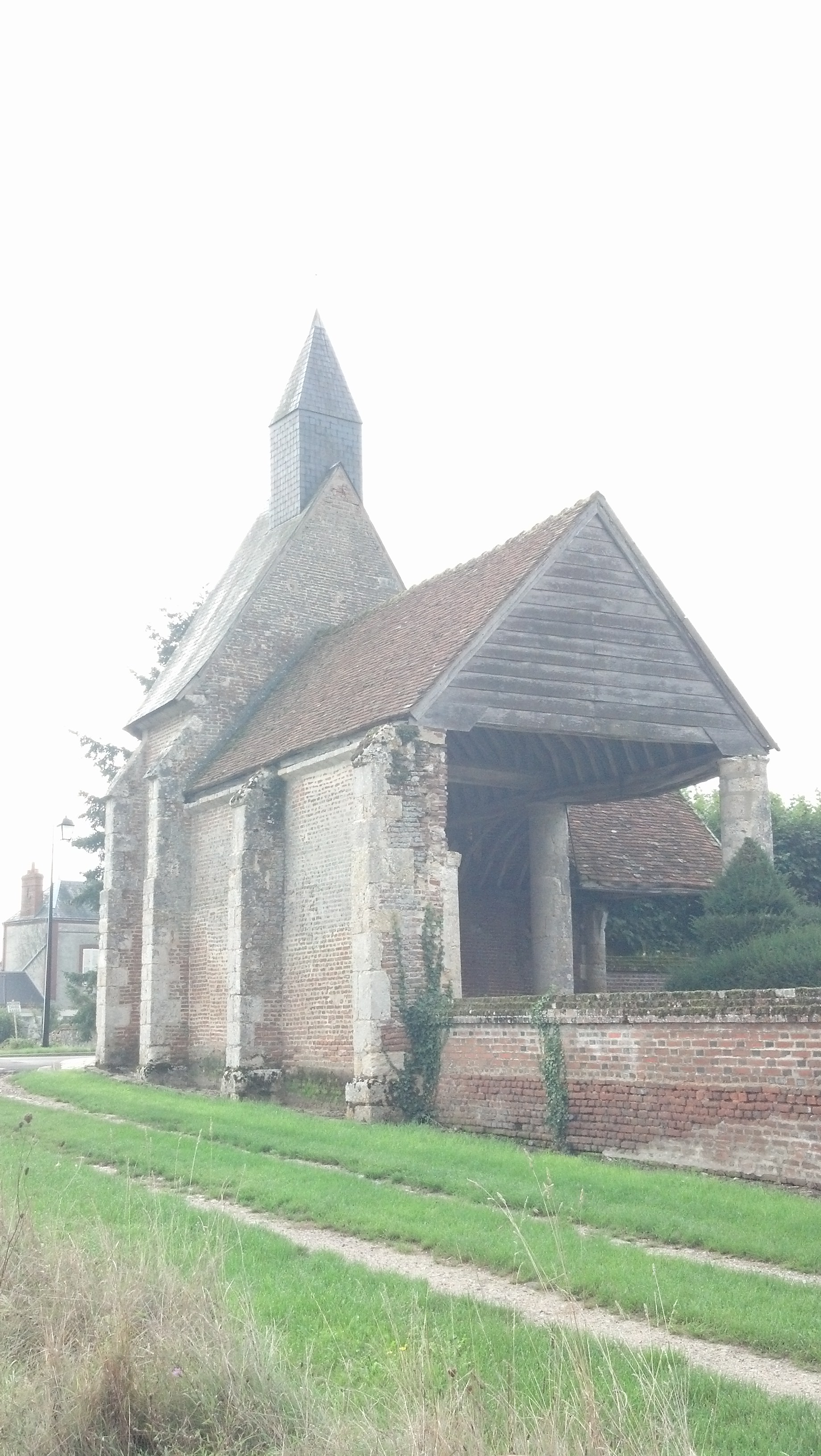
- The chapel in Boiscommun

- Coat of arms
- Location of Boiscommun
- Location within France Location within Centre-Val de Loire
- Coordinates: 48°02′15″N 2°23′02″E
- Country: France
- Region: Centre-Val de Loire
- Department: Loiret
- Arrondissement: Pithiviers
- Canton: Le Malesherbois
- Intercommunality: Pithiverais-Gâtinais

Government
  - Mayor (2020–2026): Jean-Marie Desbois
- Area^{1}: 16.06 km^{2} (6.20 sq mi)
- Highest elevation: 147 m (482 ft)
- Lowest elevation: 108 m (354 ft)
- Population (2023): 1,151
  - Density: 71.67/km^{2} (185.6/sq mi)
- Time zone: UTC+01:00 (CET)
  - Summer (DST): UTC+02:00 (CEST)
- INSEE/Postal code: 45035 /45340
- ^{1} French Land Register data, which excludes lakes, ponds, glaciers > 1 km^{2} (0.386 sq mi or 247 acres) and river estuaries.

Boiscommun (French pronunciation: [bwakɔmɛ̃]) is a commune in the Loiret department in north-central France.

== Population ==
Historical population
Year	Pop.	±% p.a.
1968	873	—
1975	841	−0.53%
1982	807	−0.59%
1990	923	+1.69%
1999	1,045	+1.39%
2007	1,168	+1.40%
2012	1,132	−0.62%
2017	1,140	+0.14%
2023	1,151	+0.16%
Source: INSEE

== See also ==
- Communes of the Loiret department
