= Montbarrois =

- Commune
- Coat of arms
- Location of Montbarrois
- Location within France Location within Centre-Val de Loire
- Coordinates: 48°02′42″N 2°24′07″E
- Country: France
- Region: Centre-Val de Loire
- Department: Loiret
- Arrondissement: Pithiviers
- Canton: Le Malesherbois
- Intercommunality: Pithiverais-Gâtinais

Government
  - Mayor (2020–2026): Odile Couillaut
- Area^{1}: 6.01 km^{2} (2.32 sq mi)
- Population (2023): 294
  - Density: 48.9/km^{2} (127/sq mi)
- Time zone: UTC+01:00 (CET)
  - Summer (DST): UTC+02:00 (CEST)
- INSEE/Postal code: 45209 /45340
- ^{1} French Land Register data, which excludes lakes, ponds, glaciers > 1 km^{2} (0.386 sq mi or 247 acres) and river estuaries.

Montbarrois (French pronunciation: [mɔ̃baʁwa]) is a commune in the Loiret department in north-central France.

== See also ==
- Communes of the Loiret department
