= Desmonts =

- Commune
- Coat of arms
- Location of Desmonts
- Location within France Location within Centre-Val de Loire
- Coordinates: 48°13′34″N 2°29′53″E
- Country: France
- Region: Centre-Val de Loire
- Department: Loiret
- Arrondissement: Pithiviers
- Canton: Le Malesherbois
- Intercommunality: Pithiverais-Gâtinais

Government
  - Mayor (2020–2026): Gérard Brichard
- Area^{1}: 4.76 km^{2} (1.84 sq mi)
- Highest elevation: 141 m (463 ft)
- Lowest elevation: 102 m (335 ft)
- Population (2023): 169
  - Density: 35.5/km^{2} (92.0/sq mi)
- Time zone: UTC+01:00 (CET)
  - Summer (DST): UTC+02:00 (CEST)
- INSEE/Postal code: 45124 /45390
- ^{1} French Land Register data, which excludes lakes, ponds, glaciers > 1 km^{2} (0.386 sq mi or 247 acres) and river estuaries.

Desmonts is a commune in the Loiret department in north-central France.

== See also ==
- Communes of the Loiret department
