= Barville-en-Gâtinais =

- Commune
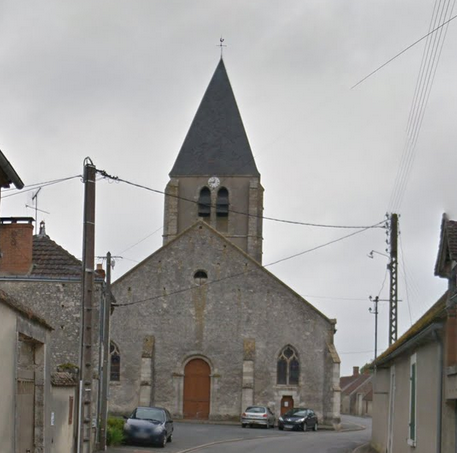
- Location of Barville-en-Gâtinais
- Location within France Location within Centre-Val de Loire
- Coordinates: 48°06′46″N 2°24′12″E
- Country: France
- Region: Centre-Val de Loire
- Department: Loiret
- Arrondissement: Pithiviers
- Canton: Le Malesherbois

Government
  - Mayor (2020–2026): Daniel Haby
- Area^{1}: 10.29 km^{2} (3.97 sq mi)
- Highest elevation: 118 m (387 ft)
- Lowest elevation: 99 m (325 ft)
- Population (2023): 304
  - Density: 29.5/km^{2} (76.5/sq mi)
- Time zone: UTC+01:00 (CET)
  - Summer (DST): UTC+02:00 (CEST)
- INSEE/Postal code: 45021 /45340
- ^{1} French Land Register data, which excludes lakes, ponds, glaciers > 1 km^{2} (0.386 sq mi or 247 acres) and river estuaries.

Barville-en-Gâtinais (French pronunciation: [baʁvil ɑ̃ ɡatinɛ], literally Barville in Gâtinais) is a commune in the Loiret department in north-central France.

== History ==
The commune was known as Barville until 1919, when its name was changed to the current Barville-en-Gâtinais.

== Population ==
Historical population
| Year | Pop. | ±% p.a. |
|---|---|---|
| 1968 | 217 | — |
| 1975 | 188 | −2.03% |
| 1982 | 175 | −1.02% |
| 1990 | 199 | +1.62% |
| 1999 | 198 | −0.06% |
| 2007 | 268 | +3.86% |
| 2012 | 323 | +3.80% |
| 2017 | 324 | +0.06% |
| 2023 | 304 | −1.06% |
Source: INSEE

== See also ==
- Communes of the Loiret department
