= Bromeilles =

- Commune
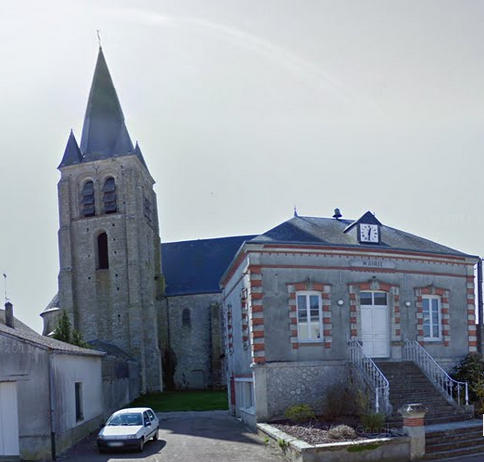
- Town hall

- Coat of arms
- Location of Bromeilles
- Location within France Location within Centre-Val de Loire
- Coordinates: 48°11′09″N 2°29′49″E
- Country: France
- Region: Centre-Val de Loire
- Department: Loiret
- Arrondissement: Pithiviers
- Canton: Le Malesherbois
- Intercommunality: Pithiverais-Gâtinais

Government
  - Mayor (2020–2026): Jean-Luc Thomas
- Area^{1}: 14.75 km^{2} (5.70 sq mi)
- Highest elevation: 131 m (430 ft)
- Lowest elevation: 89 m (292 ft)
- Population (2023): 319
  - Density: 21.6/km^{2} (56.0/sq mi)
- Time zone: UTC+01:00 (CET)
  - Summer (DST): UTC+02:00 (CEST)
- INSEE/Postal code: 45056 /45390
- ^{1} French Land Register data, which excludes lakes, ponds, glaciers > 1 km^{2} (0.386 sq mi or 247 acres) and river estuaries.

Bromeilles (French pronunciation: [bʁɔmɛj]) is a commune in the Loiret department in north-central France.

== Population ==
Historical population
Year	Pop.	±% p.a.
1968	303	—
1975	262	−2.06%
1982	264	+0.11%
1990	260	−0.19%
1999	292	+1.30%
2007	337	+1.81%
2012	313	−1.47%
2017	329	+1.00%
2023	319	−0.51%
Source: INSEE

== See also ==
- Communes of the Loiret department
