= Dimancheville =

- Commune
- Coat of arms
- Location of Dimancheville
- Location within France Location within Centre-Val de Loire
- Coordinates: 48°14′05″N 2°25′48″E
- Country: France
- Region: Centre-Val de Loire
- Department: Loiret
- Arrondissement: Pithiviers
- Canton: Le Malesherbois
- Intercommunality: Pithiverais-Gâtinais

Government
  - Mayor (2020–2026): Gérard Gainville
- Area^{1}: 2.35 km^{2} (0.91 sq mi)
- Highest elevation: 133 m (436 ft)
- Lowest elevation: 77 m (253 ft)
- Population (2023): 105
  - Density: 44.7/km^{2} (116/sq mi)
- Demonym: Dimanchevillois
- Time zone: UTC+01:00 (CET)
  - Summer (DST): UTC+02:00 (CEST)
- INSEE/Postal code: 45125 /45390
- ^{1} French Land Register data, which excludes lakes, ponds, glaciers > 1 km^{2} (0.386 sq mi or 247 acres) and river estuaries.

Dimancheville (French pronunciation: [dimɑ̃ʃvil]) is a commune in the Loiret department in north-central France.

== See also ==
- Communes of the Loiret department
