= Puiseaux =

- Commune
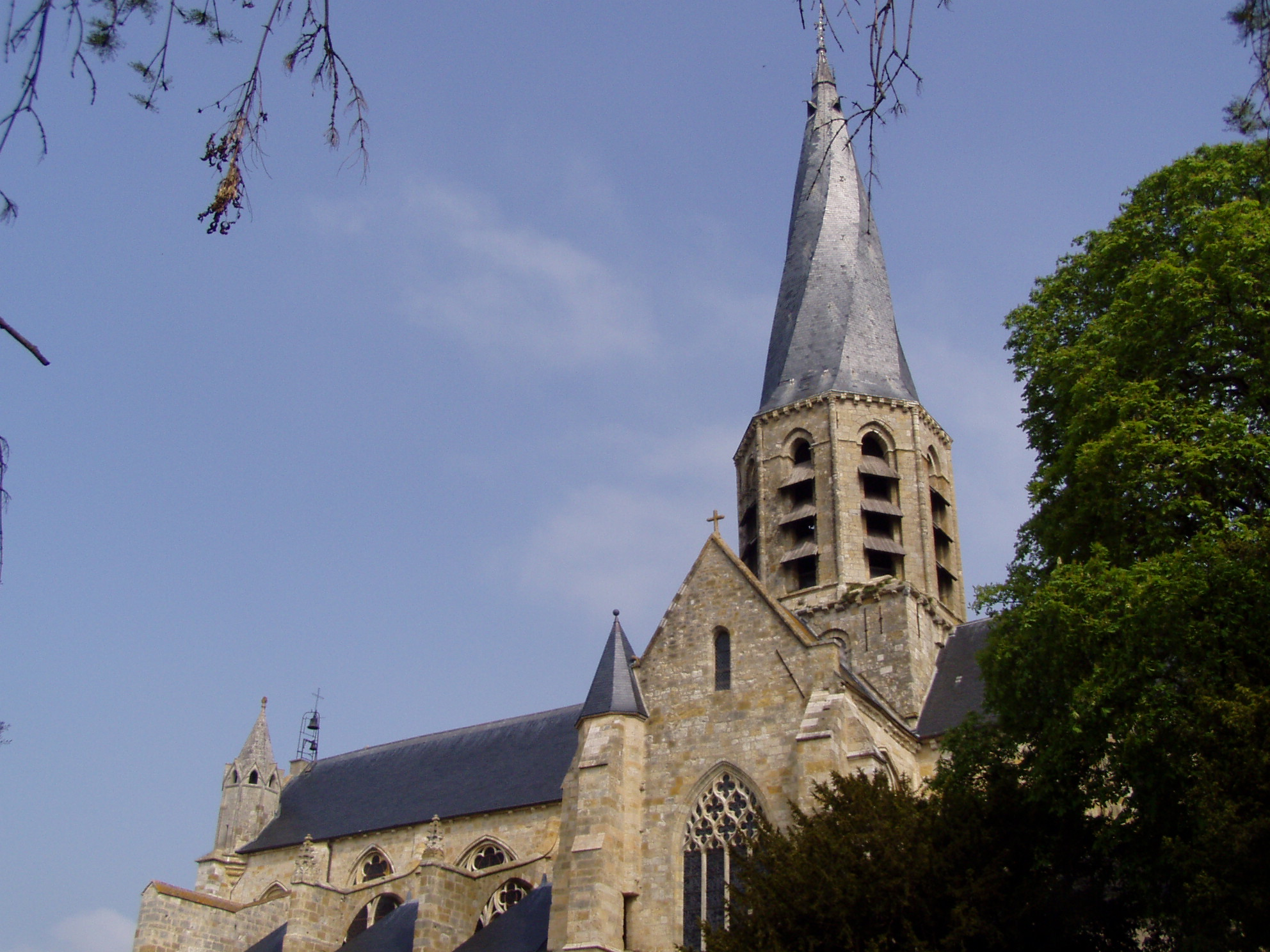
- The church in Puiseaux

- Coat of arms
- Location of Puiseaux
- Location within France Location within Centre-Val de Loire
- Coordinates: 48°12′22″N 2°28′18″E
- Country: France
- Region: Centre-Val de Loire
- Department: Loiret
- Arrondissement: Pithiviers
- Canton: Le Malesherbois

Government
  - Mayor (2020–2026): Marie-Claude Herblot
- Area^{1}: 20.32 km^{2} (7.85 sq mi)
- Elevation: 94 m (308 ft)
- Highest elevation: 141 m (463 ft)
- Lowest elevation: 82 m (269 ft)
- Population (2023): 3,299
  - Density: 162.4/km^{2} (420.5/sq mi)
- Time zone: UTC+01:00 (CET)
  - Summer (DST): UTC+02:00 (CEST)
- INSEE/Postal code: 45258 /45390
- ^{1} French Land Register data, which excludes lakes, ponds, glaciers > 1 km^{2} (0.386 sq mi or 247 acres) and river estuaries.

Puiseaux (French pronunciation: [pɥizo]) is a commune in the Loiret department in north-central France.

== Population ==
Historical population
Year	Pop.	±% p.a.
1968	2,097	—
1975	2,357	+1.68%
1982	2,607	+1.45%
1990	2,915	+1.41%
1999	3,045	+0.49%
2007	3,272	+0.90%
2012	3,334	+0.38%
2017	3,416	+0.49%
2023	3,299	−0.58%
Source: INSEE

== Mayors ==
List of successive mayors
Term	Name
1973–1995	Pierre Frérot
1995–2008	Christian Blumenfeld
2008–2014	Claude Houzé
2014–2020	Michel Touraine
2020–incumbent	Marie-Claude Herblot

== See also ==
- Communes of the Loiret department
