= Aulnay-la-Rivière =

- Commune
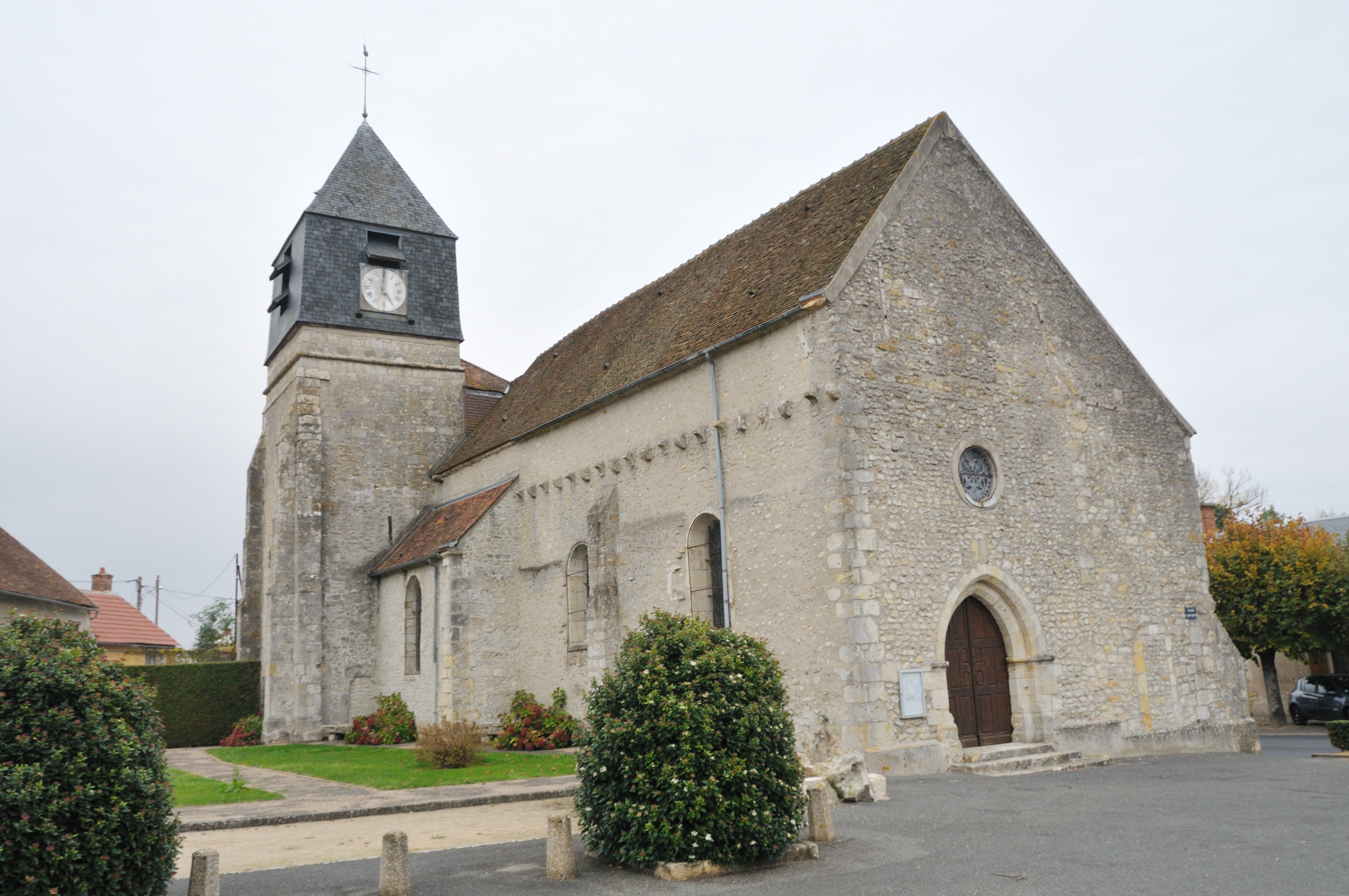
- The church in Aulnay-la-Rivière

- Coat of arms
- Location of Aulnay-la-Rivière
- Location within France Location within Centre-Val de Loire
- Coordinates: 48°11′47″N 2°22′47″E
- Country: France
- Region: Centre-Val de Loire
- Department: Loiret
- Arrondissement: Pithiviers
- Canton: Le Malesherbois
- Intercommunality: CC Pithiverais-Gâtinais

Government
  - Mayor (2020–2026): Véronique Lévy
- Area^{1}: 16.14 km^{2} (6.23 sq mi)
- Highest elevation: 137 m (449 ft)
- Lowest elevation: 82 m (269 ft)
- Population (2023): 511
  - Density: 31.7/km^{2} (82.0/sq mi)
- Time zone: UTC+01:00 (CET)
  - Summer (DST): UTC+02:00 (CEST)
- INSEE/Postal code: 45014 /45390
- ^{1} French Land Register data, which excludes lakes, ponds, glaciers > 1 km^{2} (0.386 sq mi or 247 acres) and river estuaries.

Aulnay-la-Rivière (French pronunciation: [o(l)nɛ la ʁivjɛʁ]) is a commune in the Loiret department in north-central France.

== Population ==
Historical population
| Year | Pop. | ±% p.a. |
|---|---|---|
| 1968 | 340 | — |
| 1975 | 362 | +0.90% |
| 1982 | 388 | +1.00% |
| 1990 | 464 | +2.26% |
| 1999 | 492 | +0.65% |
| 2007 | 515 | +0.57% |
| 2012 | 510 | −0.19% |
| 2017 | 506 | −0.16% |
| 2023 | 511 | +0.16% |
Source: INSEE

== See also ==
- Communes of the Loiret department
