= Chambon-la-Forêt =

- Commune
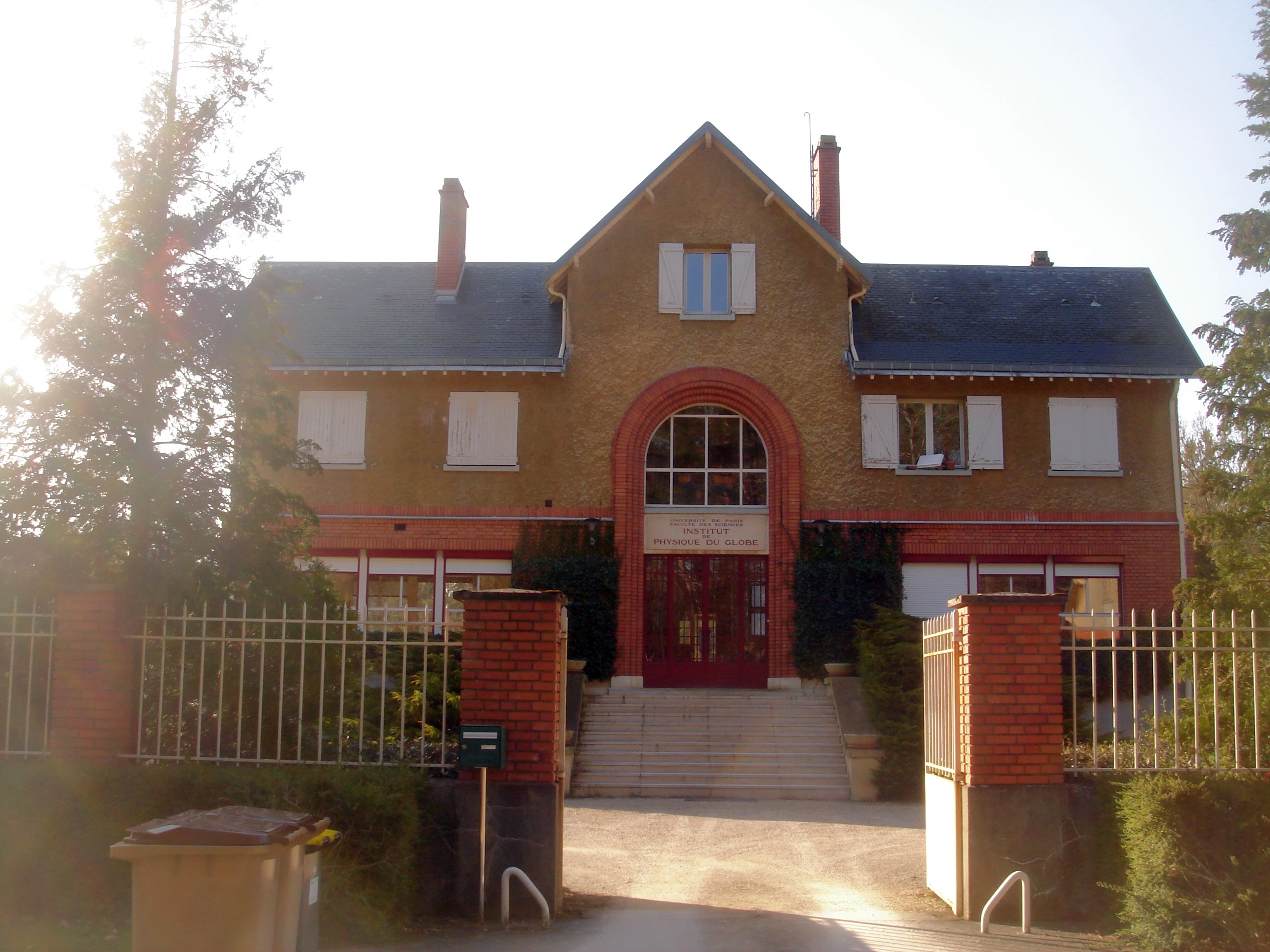
- The National Magnetic Observatory at Chambon-la-Forêt
- Location of Chambon-la-Forêt
- Location within France Location within Centre-Val de Loire
- Coordinates: 48°04′09″N 2°17′56″E
- Country: France
- Region: Centre-Val de Loire
- Department: Loiret
- Arrondissement: Pithiviers
- Canton: Le Malesherbois
- Intercommunality: Pithiverais-Gâtinais

Government
  - Mayor (2020–2026): Michel Berthelot
- Area^{1}: 17 km^{2} (6.6 sq mi)
- Elevation: 122 m (400 ft)
- Population (2023): 965
  - Density: 57/km^{2} (150/sq mi)
- Demonym: Chambonnais or Chambonniots
- Time zone: UTC+01:00 (CET)
  - Summer (DST): UTC+02:00 (CEST)
- INSEE/Postal code: 45069 /45340
- ^{1} French Land Register data, which excludes lakes, ponds, glaciers > 1 km^{2} (0.386 sq mi or 247 acres) and river estuaries.

Chambon-la-Forêt (French pronunciation: [ʃɑ̃bɔ̃ la fɔʁɛ]; lit. 'Chambon-the-Forest') is a rural commune in the Loiret department in north-central France.

== See also ==
- Communes of the Loiret department
