= Égry =

- Commune
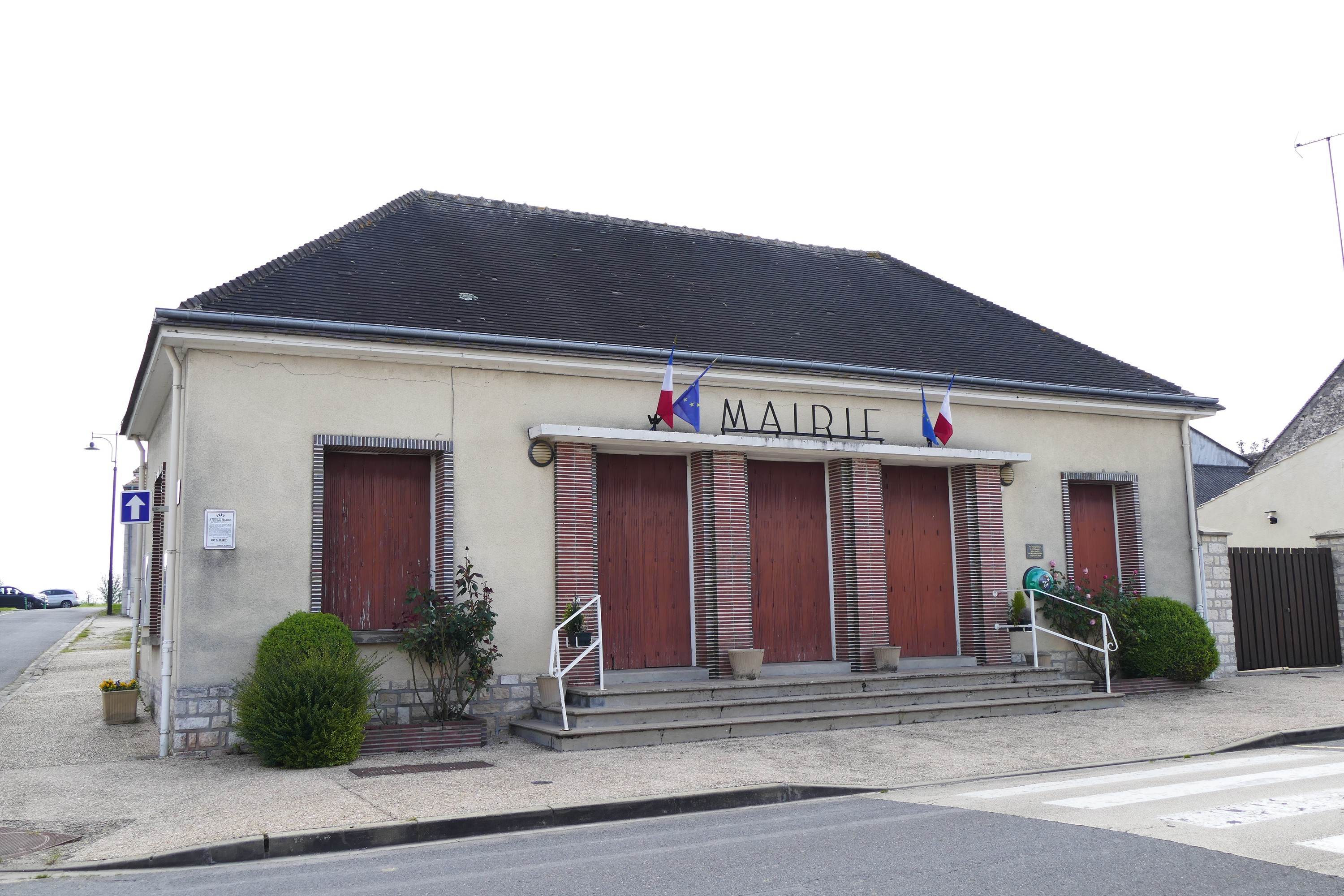
- Égry Town hall
- Location of Égry
- Location within France Location within Centre-Val de Loire
- Coordinates: 48°06′11″N 2°28′13″E
- Country: France
- Region: Centre-Val de Loire
- Department: Loiret
- Arrondissement: Pithiviers
- Canton: Le Malesherbois
- Intercommunality: Pithiverais-Gâtinais

Government
  - Mayor (2020–2026): Jean-Louis Dujardin
- Area^{1}: 7.39 km^{2} (2.85 sq mi)
- Highest elevation: 115 m (377 ft)
- Lowest elevation: 95 m (312 ft)
- Population (2023): 357
  - Density: 48.3/km^{2} (125/sq mi)
- Demonym: les Egryons
- Time zone: UTC+01:00 (CET)
  - Summer (DST): UTC+02:00 (CEST)
- INSEE/Postal code: 45132 /45340
- ^{1} French Land Register data, which excludes lakes, ponds, glaciers > 1 km^{2} (0.386 sq mi or 247 acres) and river estuaries.

Égry (French pronunciation: [eɡʁi]) is a commune in the Loiret department in north-central France.

== History ==
The Château de La Mothe d'Égry was mentioned in 1360. Only some sections of wall and a stone bridge crossing its moat remain of the castle. Égry was a fief of the royal Duchy of Nemours.

== See also ==
- Communes of the Loiret department
