= Saint-Michel, Loiret =

Saint-Michel
- Commune
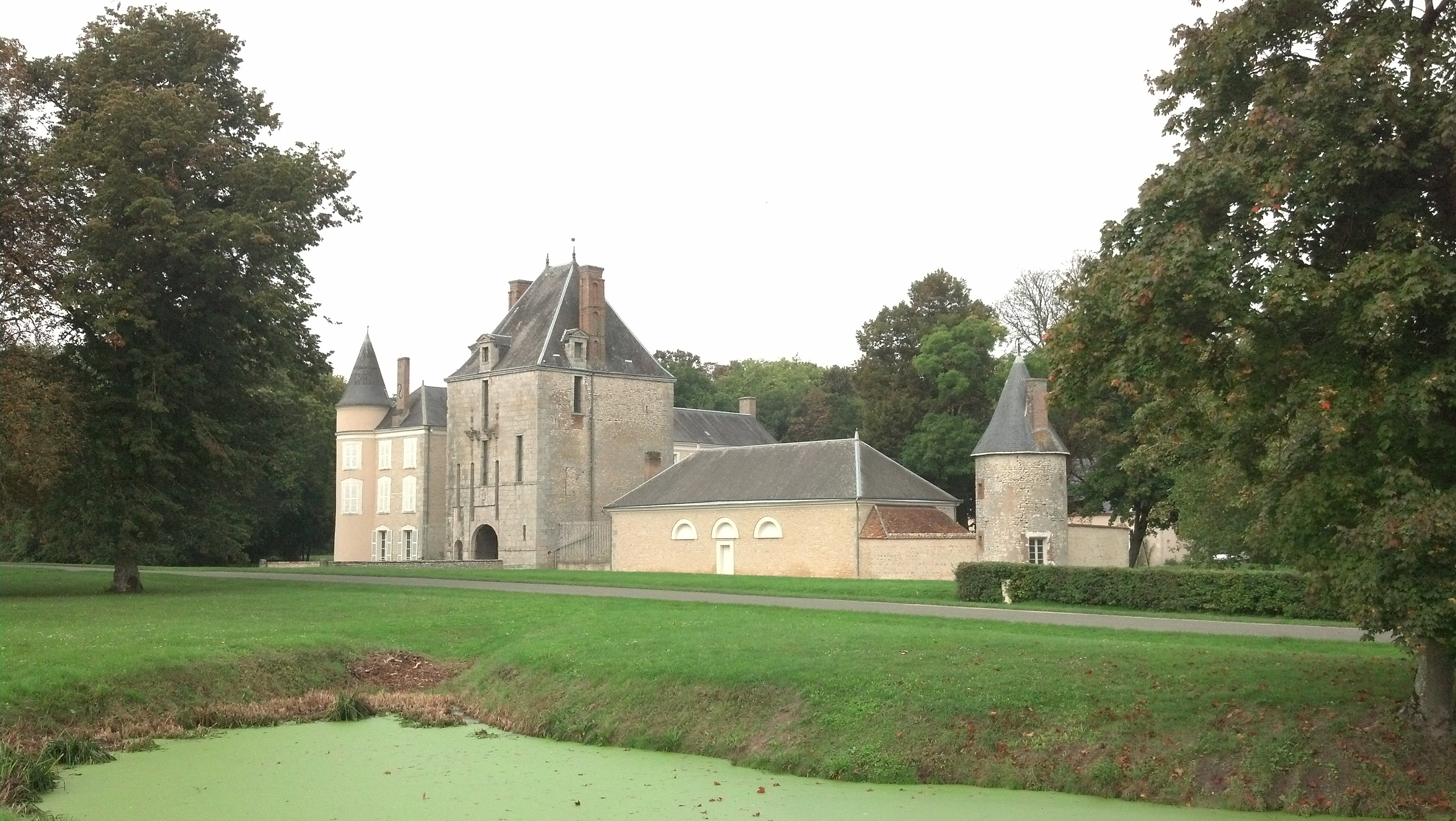
- The château in Saint-Michel

- Coat of arms
- Location of Saint-Michel
- Location within France Location within Centre-Val de Loire
- Coordinates: 48°03′50″N 2°22′12″E
- Country: France
- Region: Centre-Val de Loire
- Department: Loiret
- Arrondissement: Pithiviers
- Canton: Le Malesherbois
- Intercommunality: Pithiverais-Gâtinais

Government
  - Mayor (2023–2026): Benjamin Quelin
- Area^{1}: 5.14 km^{2} (1.98 sq mi)
- Population (2023): 151
  - Density: 29.4/km^{2} (76.1/sq mi)
- Time zone: UTC+01:00 (CET)
  - Summer (DST): UTC+02:00 (CEST)
- INSEE/Postal code: 45294 /45340
- ^{1} French Land Register data, which excludes lakes, ponds, glaciers > 1 km^{2} (0.386 sq mi or 247 acres) and river estuaries.

Saint-Michel (French pronunciation: [sɛ̃ miʃɛl]) is a commune in the Loiret department in north-central France.

== See also ==
- Communes of the Loiret department
