= Juranville =

- Commune
- Coat of arms
- Location of Juranville
- Location within France Location within Centre-Val de Loire
- Coordinates: 48°03′14″N 2°29′47″E
- Country: France
- Region: Centre-Val de Loire
- Department: Loiret
- Arrondissement: Pithiviers
- Canton: Le Malesherbois
- Intercommunality: Pithiverais-Gâtinais

Government
  - Mayor (2020–2026): Michel Sureau
- Area^{1}: 15.23 km^{2} (5.88 sq mi)
- Highest elevation: 110 m (360 ft)
- Lowest elevation: 85 m (279 ft)
- Population (2023): 450
  - Density: 30/km^{2} (77/sq mi)
- Demonym: Juranvillois
- Time zone: UTC+01:00 (CET)
  - Summer (DST): UTC+02:00 (CEST)
- INSEE/Postal code: 45176 /45340
- ^{1} French Land Register data, which excludes lakes, ponds, glaciers > 1 km^{2} (0.386 sq mi or 247 acres) and river estuaries.

Juranville (French pronunciation: [ʒyʁɑ̃vil]) is a commune in the Loiret department in north-central France.

== See also ==
- Communes of the Loiret department
