= Grangermont =

- Commune
- Coat of arms
- Location of Grangermont
- Location within France Location within Centre-Val de Loire
- Coordinates: 48°11′25″N 2°25′38″E
- Country: France
- Region: Centre-Val de Loire
- Department: Loiret
- Arrondissement: Pithiviers
- Canton: Le Malesherbois
- Intercommunality: Pithiverais-Gâtinais

Government
  - Mayor (2020–2026): Stéphanie Goffinet
- Area^{1}: 3.93 km^{2} (1.52 sq mi)
- Highest elevation: 128 m (420 ft)
- Lowest elevation: 91 m (299 ft)
- Population (2023): 175
  - Density: 44.5/km^{2} (115/sq mi)
- Demonym: Grangermontois
- Time zone: UTC+01:00 (CET)
  - Summer (DST): UTC+02:00 (CEST)
- INSEE/Postal code: 45159 /45390
- ^{1} French Land Register data, which excludes lakes, ponds, glaciers > 1 km^{2} (0.386 sq mi or 247 acres) and river estuaries.

Grangermont (French pronunciation: [ɡʁɑ̃ʒɛʁmɔ̃]) is a commune in the Loiret department in north-central France.

== See also ==
- Communes of the Loiret department
