= Nibelle =

- Commune
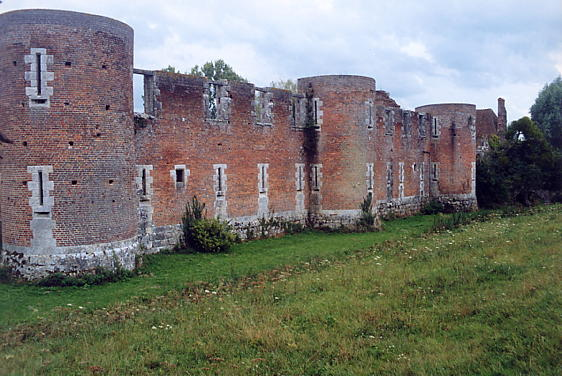
- The chateau in Nibelle

- Coat of arms
- Location of Nibelle
- Location within France Location within Centre-Val de Loire
- Coordinates: 48°01′19″N 2°19′39″E
- Country: France
- Region: Centre-Val de Loire
- Department: Loiret
- Arrondissement: Pithiviers
- Canton: Le Malesherbois
- Intercommunality: Pithiverais-Gâtinais

Government
  - Mayor (2020–2026): Catherine Ragobert
- Area^{1}: 27.18 km^{2} (10.49 sq mi)
- Highest elevation: 170 m (560 ft)
- Lowest elevation: 117 m (384 ft)
- Population (2023): 1,171
  - Density: 43.08/km^{2} (111.6/sq mi)
- Demonym: Nibellois
- Time zone: UTC+01:00 (CET)
  - Summer (DST): UTC+02:00 (CEST)
- INSEE/Postal code: 45228 /45340
- ^{1} French Land Register data, which excludes lakes, ponds, glaciers > 1 km^{2} (0.386 sq mi or 247 acres) and river estuaries.

Nibelle (French pronunciation: [nibɛl]) is a commune in the Loiret department in north-central France.

== Location ==
Map of the commune of Nibelle and its neighboring communes. The commune of Nibelle is located in the northeast quadrant of the Loiret department, in the agricultural region of Orléanais. As the crow flies, it is 33.9 km from Orléans], the department's prefecture, 17.7 km from Pithiviers, the sub-prefecture, and 9.3 km from Beaune-la-Rolande, the former chief town of the canton to which the commune belonged before March 2015. The commune is part of the Beaune-la-Rolande catchment area.

The nearest municipalities are: Nesploy (3.8 km), Boiscommun (4.4 km), Chambon-la-Forêt (4.4 km), Nancray-sur-Rimarde (5.1 km), Montliard (5.2 km), Montbarrois (6 km), Sury-aux-Bois (6.3 km), Saint-Michel (6.4 km). Batilly-en-Gâtinais (6.9 km) and Seichebrières (7.2 km).

== See also ==
- Communes of the Loiret department
