= Orville, Loiret =

Orville
- Commune
- Coat of arms
- Location of Orville
- Location within France Location within Centre-Val de Loire
- Coordinates: 48°14′34″N 2°26′18″E
- Country: France
- Region: Centre-Val de Loire
- Department: Loiret
- Arrondissement: Pithiviers
- Canton: Le Malesherbois
- Intercommunality: Pithiverais-Gâtinais

Government
  - Mayor (2020–2026): Olivier Crissa
- Area^{1}: 7.19 km^{2} (2.78 sq mi)
- Highest elevation: 115 m (377 ft)
- Lowest elevation: 72 m (236 ft)
- Population (2023): 128
  - Density: 17.8/km^{2} (46.1/sq mi)
- Demonym: Orvillois
- Time zone: UTC+01:00 (CET)
  - Summer (DST): UTC+02:00 (CEST)
- INSEE/Postal code: 45237 /45390
- ^{1} French Land Register data, which excludes lakes, ponds, glaciers > 1 km^{2} (0.386 sq mi or 247 acres) and river estuaries.

Orville (French pronunciation: [ɔʁvil]) is a commune in the Loiret department in north-central France.

== See also ==
- Communes of the Loiret department
