= Courcelles-le-Roi =

- Commune
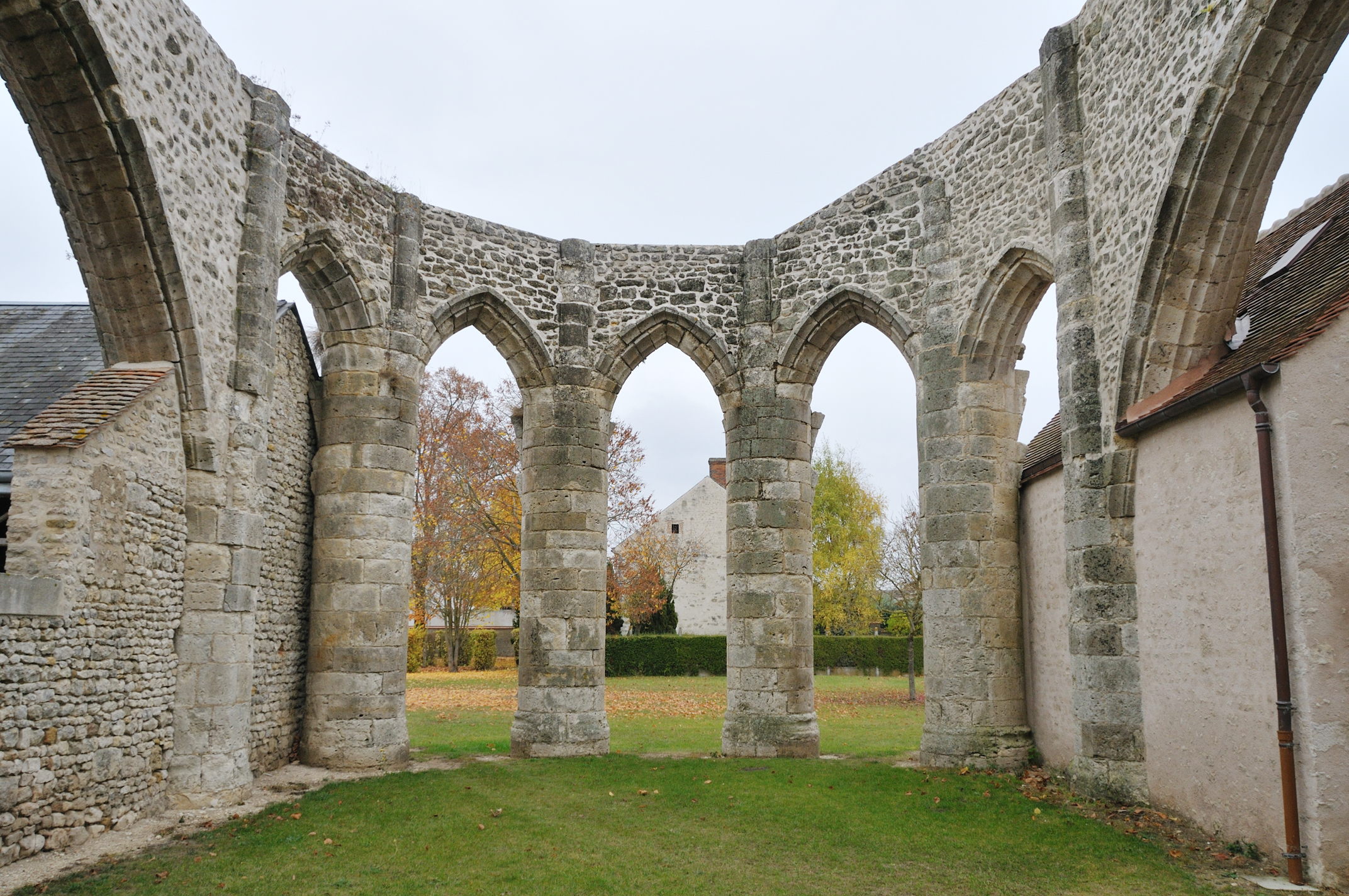
- The unfinished choir of the church in Courcelles

- Coat of arms
- Location of Courcelles-le-Roi
- Location within France Location within Centre-Val de Loire
- Coordinates: 48°05′46″N 2°19′08″E
- Country: France
- Region: Centre-Val de Loire
- Department: Loiret
- Arrondissement: Pithiviers
- Canton: Le Malesherbois
- Intercommunality: Pithiverais-Gâtinais

Government
  - Mayor (2020–2026): Jonathan Wera
- Area^{1}: 6.3 km^{2} (2.4 sq mi)
- Highest elevation: 118 m (387 ft)
- Lowest elevation: 97 m (318 ft)
- Population (2023): 316
  - Density: 50/km^{2} (130/sq mi)
- Demonym: Courcellois
- Time zone: UTC+01:00 (CET)
  - Summer (DST): UTC+02:00 (CEST)
- INSEE/Postal code: 45110 /
- ^{1} French Land Register data, which excludes lakes, ponds, glaciers > 1 km^{2} (0.386 sq mi or 247 acres) and river estuaries.

Courcelles-le-Roi (French pronunciation: [kuʁsɛl lə ʁwa]; lit. 'Courcelles-the-King'; before 2018: Courcelles) is a rural commune in the Loiret department in north-central France.

== See also ==
- Communes of the Loiret department
