= Boësses =

- Commune
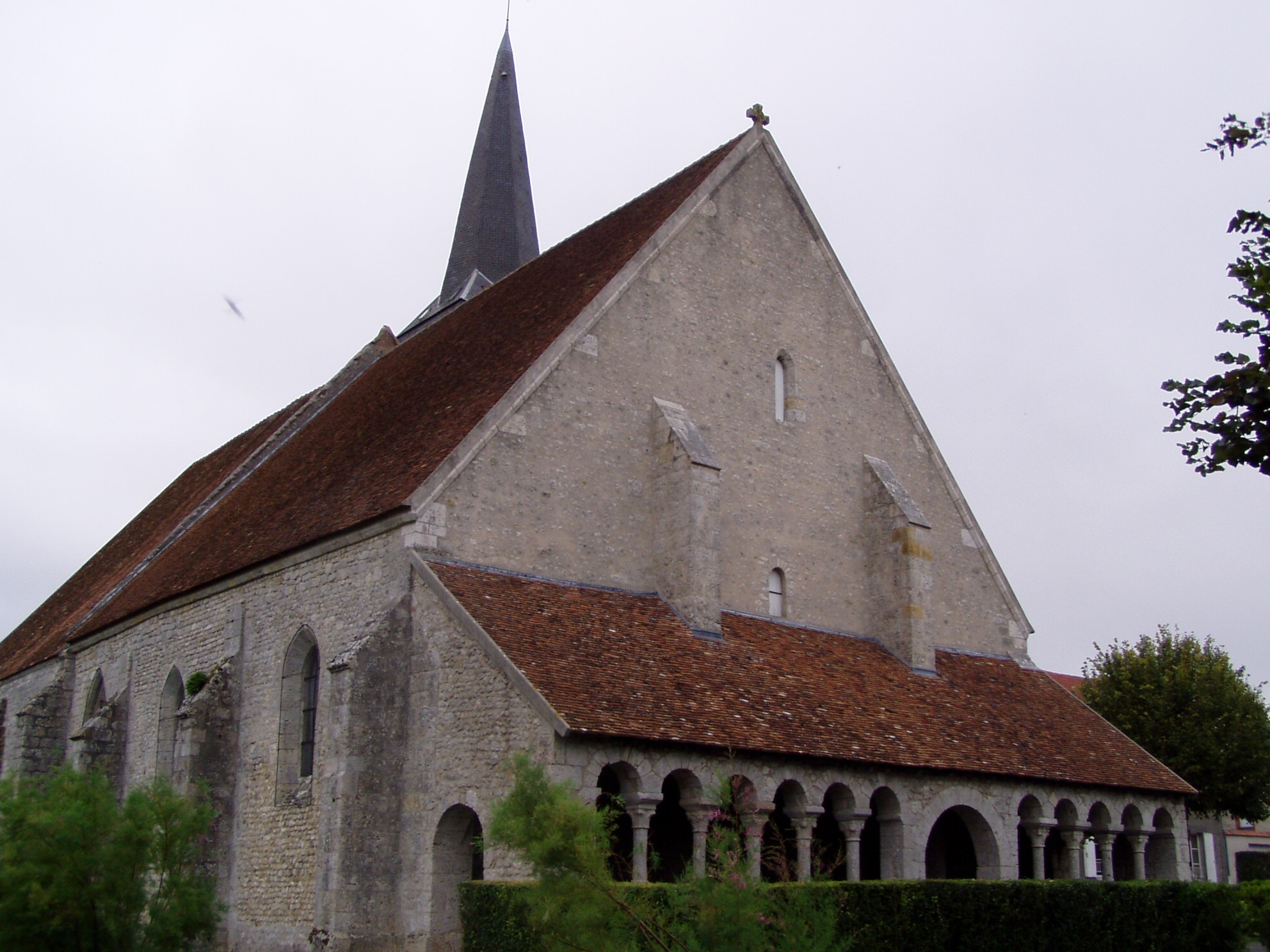
- The church in Boësses

- Coat of arms
- Location of Boësses
- Location within France Location within Centre-Val de Loire
- Coordinates: 48°09′06″N 2°26′54″E
- Country: France
- Region: Centre-Val de Loire
- Department: Loiret
- Arrondissement: Pithiviers
- Canton: Le Malesherbois
- Intercommunality: Pithiverais-Gâtinais

Government
  - Mayor (2020–2026): Pierre Petiot
- Area^{1}: 13.13 km^{2} (5.07 sq mi)
- Highest elevation: 128 m (420 ft)
- Lowest elevation: 91 m (299 ft)
- Population (2023): 384
  - Density: 29.2/km^{2} (75.7/sq mi)
- Time zone: UTC+01:00 (CET)
  - Summer (DST): UTC+02:00 (CEST)
- INSEE/Postal code: 45033 /45390
- ^{1} French Land Register data, which excludes lakes, ponds, glaciers > 1 km^{2} (0.386 sq mi or 247 acres) and river estuaries.

Boësses (French pronunciation: [bɔɛs], before 2001: Boësse) is a commune in the Loiret department in north-central France.

== Population ==
Historical population
Year	Pop.	±% p.a.
1968	330	—
1975	321	−0.39%
1982	287	−1.59%
1990	308	+0.89%
1999	351	+1.46%
2007	368	+0.59%
2012	410	+2.19%
2017	380	−1.51%
2023	384	+0.17%
Source: INSEE

== See also ==
- Communes of the Loiret department
