= Échilleuses =

- Commune
- Coat of arms
- Location of Échilleuses
- Location within France Location within Centre-Val de Loire
- Coordinates: 48°09′53″N 2°26′38″E
- Country: France
- Region: Centre-Val de Loire
- Department: Loiret
- Arrondissement: Pithiviers
- Canton: Le Malesherbois
- Intercommunality: Pithiverais-Gâtinais

Government
  - Mayor (2020–2026): Alexandre Leotard
- Area^{1}: 12.43 km^{2} (4.80 sq mi)
- Highest elevation: 129 m (423 ft)
- Lowest elevation: 91 m (299 ft)
- Population (2023): 390
  - Density: 31/km^{2} (81/sq mi)
- Time zone: UTC+01:00 (CET)
  - Summer (DST): UTC+02:00 (CEST)
- INSEE/Postal code: 45131 /45390
- ^{1} French Land Register data, which excludes lakes, ponds, glaciers > 1 km^{2} (0.386 sq mi or 247 acres) and river estuaries.

Échilleuses is a commune in the Loiret department in north-central France.

== See also ==
- Communes of the Loiret department
