= Auxy, Loiret =

Auxy
- Commune
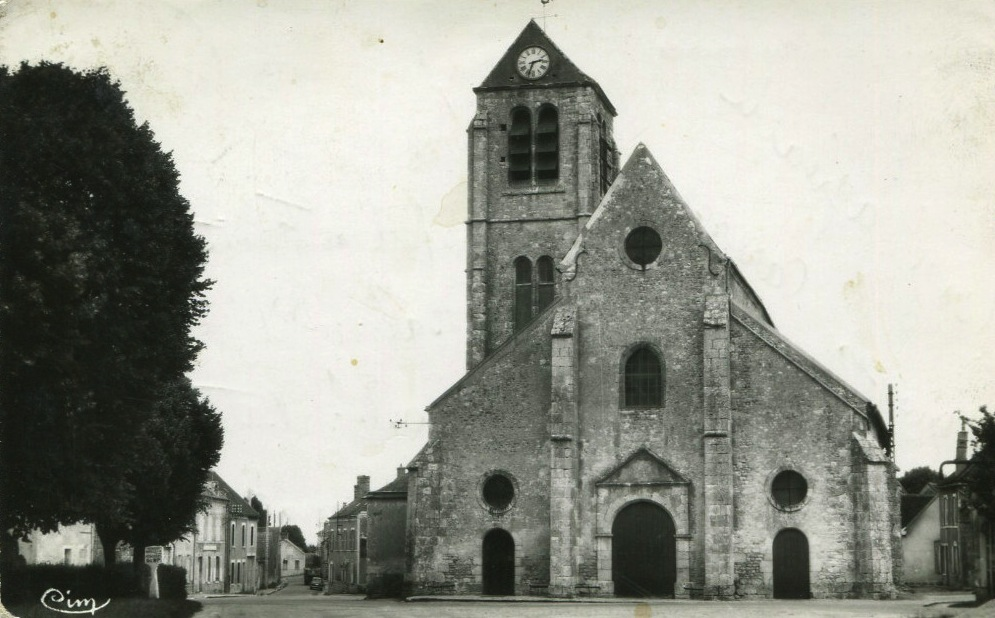
- The church in Auxy

- Coat of arms
- Location of Auxy
- Location within France Location within Centre-Val de Loire
- Coordinates: 48°07′10″N 2°28′31″E
- Country: France
- Region: Centre-Val de Loire
- Department: Loiret
- Arrondissement: Pithiviers
- Canton: Le Malesherbois
- Intercommunality: CC Pithiverais-Gâtinais

Government
  - Mayor (2020–2026): Sophie Pelhate
- Area^{1}: 20.28 km^{2} (7.83 sq mi)
- Highest elevation: 117 m (384 ft)
- Lowest elevation: 81 m (266 ft)
- Population (2023): 948
  - Density: 46.7/km^{2} (121/sq mi)
- Time zone: UTC+01:00 (CET)
  - Summer (DST): UTC+02:00 (CEST)
- INSEE/Postal code: 45018 /45340
- ^{1} French Land Register data, which excludes lakes, ponds, glaciers > 1 km^{2} (0.386 sq mi or 247 acres) and river estuaries.

Auxy (French pronunciation: [oksi]) is a commune in the Loiret department in north-central France.

== Population ==
Historical population
Year	Pop.	±% p.a.
1968	748	—
1975	684	−1.27%
1982	656	−0.60%
1990	682	+0.49%
1999	854	+2.53%
2007	988	+1.84%
2012	965	−0.47%
2017	987	+0.45%
2023	948	−0.67%
Source: INSEE

== See also ==
- Communes of the Loiret department
