= Lorcy =

- Commune
- Location of Lorcy
- Location within France Location within Centre-Val de Loire
- Coordinates: 48°03′10″N 2°32′04″E
- Country: France
- Region: Centre-Val de Loire
- Department: Loiret
- Arrondissement: Pithiviers
- Canton: Le Malesherbois
- Intercommunality: Pithiverais-Gâtinais

Government
  - Mayor (2020–2026): Christophe Bauer
- Area^{1}: 16.75 km^{2} (6.47 sq mi)
- Highest elevation: 99 m (325 ft)
- Lowest elevation: 85 m (279 ft)
- Population (2023): 591
  - Density: 35.3/km^{2} (91.4/sq mi)
- Time zone: UTC+01:00 (CET)
  - Summer (DST): UTC+02:00 (CEST)
- INSEE/Postal code: 45186 /45490
- ^{1} French Land Register data, which excludes lakes, ponds, glaciers > 1 km^{2} (0.386 sq mi or 247 acres) and river estuaries.

Lorcy (French pronunciation: [lɔʁsi]) is a commune in the Loiret department in north-central France.

== See also ==
- Communes of the Loiret department
