= Canton of Le Malesherbois =

Coordinates: 48.30°N 2.41°E

The canton of Le Malesherbois (before 2021: Malesherbes) is an administrative division of the Loiret department, central France. Its borders were modified at the French canton reorganisation which came into effect in March 2015. Its seat is in Le Malesherbois.

It consists of the following communes:

1. Ascoux
2. Augerville-la-Rivière
3. Aulnay-la-Rivière
4. Auxy
5. Barville-en-Gâtinais
6. Batilly-en-Gâtinais
7. Beaune-la-Rolande
8. Boësses
9. Boiscommun
10. Bondaroy
11. Bordeaux-en-Gâtinais
12. Bouilly-en-Gâtinais
13. Bouzonville-aux-Bois
14. Boynes
15. Briarres-sur-Essonne
16. Bromeilles
17. Chambon-la-Forêt
18. Chilleurs-aux-Bois
19. Courcelles-le-Roi
20. Courcy-aux-Loges
21. Desmonts
22. Dimancheville
23. Échilleuses
24. Égry
25. Escrennes
26. Estouy
27. Gaubertin
28. Givraines
29. Grangermont
30. Juranville
31. Laas
32. Lorcy
33. Le Malesherbois
34. Mareau-aux-Bois
35. Marsainvilliers
36. Montbarrois
37. Montliard
38. Nancray-sur-Rimarde
39. La Neuville-sur-Essonne
40. Nibelle
41. Ondreville-sur-Essonne
42. Orville
43. Puiseaux
44. Ramoulu
45. Saint-Loup-des-Vignes
46. Saint-Michel
47. Santeau
48. Vrigny
49. Yèvre-la-Ville
