= Bucy =

Bucy may refer to:

== People ==
- John Bucy III, American businessman and politician.
- Michel Bucy (1484–1511), archbishop of Bourges and illegitimate son of Louis XII.
- Paul Bucy (1904–1992), American neurosurgeon.
- Richard S. Bucy (1935–2019), American mathematician and engineer known for the Kalman filter.

== Places ==
- Bucy-le-Long, France
- Bucy-le-Roi, France
- Bucy-lès-Cerny, France
- Bucy-lès-Pierrepont, France
- Bucy-Saint-Liphard, France
