= Arrondissement of Orléans =

Coordinates: 47°55′N 1°54′E

Orléans
- Arrondissement
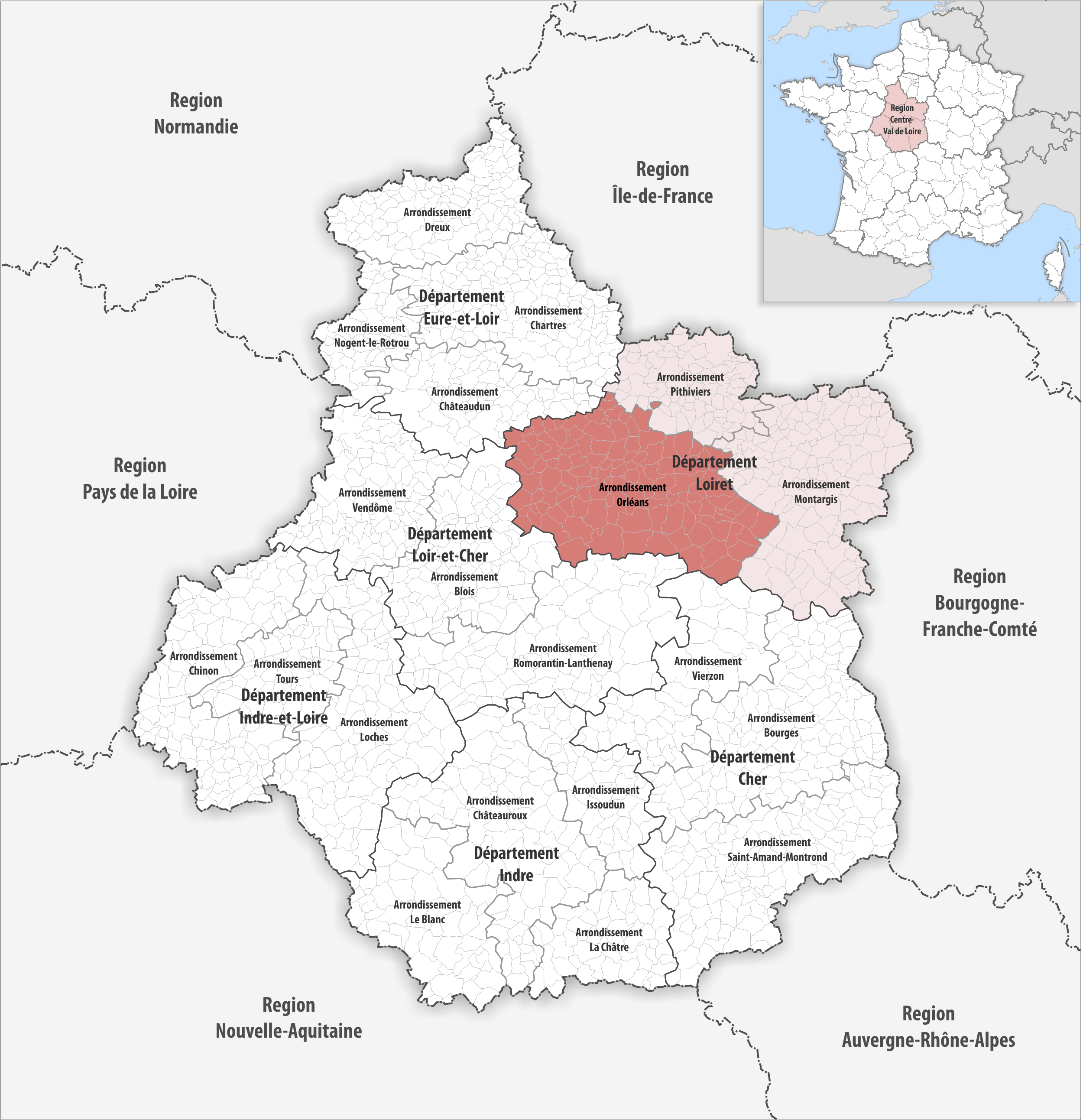
- Location within the region Centre-Val de Loire
- Country: France
- Region: Centre-Val de Loire
- Department: Loiret
- No. of communes: {{{nbcomm}}}
- Area: 2,925.4 km^{2} (1,129.5 sq mi)
- Population (2023): 460,044
  - Density: 157.26/km^{2} (407.30/sq mi)
- INSEE code: 452

The arrondissement of Orléans is an arrondissement of France in the Loiret department in the Centre-Val de Loire region. It has 121 communes. Its population is 453,067 (2021), and its area is 2,925.4 km^{2} (1,129.5 sq mi).

== Composition ==
The communes of the arrondissement of Orléans, and their INSEE codes, are:

1. Ardon (45006)
2. Artenay (45008)
3. Baccon (45019)
4. Le Bardon (45020)
5. Baule (45024)
6. Beaugency (45028)
7. Boigny-sur-Bionne (45034)
8. Bonnée (45039)
9. Les Bordes (45042)
10. Bou (45043)
11. Bougy-lez-Neuville (45044)
12. Boulay-les-Barres (45046)
13. Bouzy-la-Forêt (45049)
14. Bray-Saint Aignan (45051)
15. Bricy (45055)
16. Bucy-le-Roi (45058)
17. Bucy-Saint-Liphard (45059)
18. Cercottes (45062)
19. Cerdon (45063)
20. Chaingy (45067)
21. Chanteau (45072)
22. La Chapelle-Onzerain (45074)
23. La Chapelle-Saint-Mesmin (45075)
24. Charsonville (45081)
25. Châteauneuf-sur-Loire (45082)
26. Chécy (45089)
27. Chevilly (45093)
28. Cléry-Saint-André (45098)
29. Coinces (45099)
30. Combleux (45100)
31. Combreux (45101)
32. Coulmiers (45109)
33. Cravant (45116)
34. Dampierre-en-Burly (45122)
35. Darvoy (45123)
36. Donnery (45126)
37. Dry (45130)
38. Épieds-en-Beauce (45134)
39. Fay-aux-Loges (45142)
40. Férolles (45144)
41. La Ferté-Saint-Aubin (45146)
42. Fleury-les-Aubrais (45147)
43. Gémigny (45152)
44. Germigny-des-Prés (45153)
45. Gidy (45154)
46. Guilly (45164)
47. Huêtre (45166)
48. Huisseau-sur-Mauves (45167)
49. Ingrannes (45168)
50. Ingré (45169)
51. Isdes (45171)
52. Jargeau (45173)
53. Jouy-le-Potier (45175)
54. Lailly-en-Val (45179)
55. Ligny-le-Ribault (45182)
56. Lion-en-Beauce (45183)
57. Lion-en-Sullias (45184)
58. Loury (45188)
59. Marcilly-en-Villette (45193)
60. Mardié (45194)
61. Mareau-aux-Prés (45196)
62. Marigny-les-Usages (45197)
63. Ménestreau-en-Villette (45200)
64. Messas (45202)
65. Meung-sur-Loire (45203)
66. Mézières-lez-Cléry (45204)
67. Montigny (45214)
68. Neuville-aux-Bois (45224)
69. Neuvy-en-Sullias (45226)
70. Olivet (45232)
71. Orléans (45234)
72. Ormes (45235)
73. Ouvrouer-les-Champs (45241)
74. Ouzouer-sur-Loire (45244)
75. Patay (45248)
76. Rebréchien (45261)
77. Rouvray-Sainte-Croix (45262)
78. Rozières-en-Beauce (45264)
79. Ruan (45266)
80. Saint-Aignan-le-Jaillard (45268)
81. Saint-Ay (45269)
82. Saint-Benoît-sur-Loire (45270)
83. Saint-Cyr-en-Val (45272)
84. Saint-Denis-de-l'Hôtel (45273)
85. Saint-Denis-en-Val (45274)
86. Saint-Florent-le-Jeune (45277)
87. Saint-Hilaire-Saint-Mesmin (45282)
88. Saint-Jean-de-Braye (45284)
89. Saint-Jean-de-la-Ruelle (45285)
90. Saint-Jean-le-Blanc (45286)
91. Saint-Lyé-la-Forêt (45289)
92. Saint-Martin-d'Abbat (45290)
93. Saint-Péravy-la-Colombe (45296)
94. Saint-Père-sur-Loire (45297)
95. Saint-Pryvé-Saint-Mesmin (45298)
96. Saint-Sigismond (45299)
97. Sandillon (45300)
98. Saran (45302)
99. Seichebrières (45305)
100. Semoy (45308)
101. Sennely (45309)
102. Sigloy (45311)
103. Sougy (45313)
104. Sully-la-Chapelle (45314)
105. Sully-sur-Loire (45315)
106. Sury-aux-Bois (45316)
107. Tavers (45317)
108. Tigy (45324)
109. Tournoisis (45326)
110. Traînou (45327)
111. Trinay (45330)
112. Vannes-sur-Cosson (45331)
113. Vennecy (45333)
114. Vienne-en-Val (45335)
115. Viglain (45336)
116. Villamblain (45337)
117. Villemurlin (45340)
118. Villeneuve-sur-Conie (45341)
119. Villereau (45342)
120. Villorceau (45344)
121. Vitry-aux-Loges (45346)

== History ==
The arrondissement of Orléans was created in 1800.

As a result of the reorganisation of the cantons of France which came into effect in 2015, the borders of the cantons are no longer related to the borders of the arrondissements. The cantons of the arrondissement of Orléans were, as of January 2015:

1. Artenay
2. Beaugency
3. Châteauneuf-sur-Loire
4. Chécy
5. Cléry-Saint-André
6. La Ferté-Saint-Aubin
7. Fleury-les-Aubrais
8. Ingré
9. Jargeau
10. Meung-sur-Loire
11. Neuville-aux-Bois
12. Olivet
13. Orléans-Bannier
14. Orléans-Bourgogne
15. Orléans-Carmes
16. Orléans-La Source
17. Orléans-Saint-Marc-Argonne
18. Orléans-Saint-Marceau
19. Ouzouer-sur-Loire
20. Patay
21. Saint-Jean-de-Braye
22. Saint-Jean-de-la-Ruelle
23. Saint-Jean-le-Blanc
24. Sully-sur-Loire
