= Épieds =

Épieds may refer to the following communes in France:

- Épieds, Aisne, in the Aisne département
- Épieds, Eure, in the Eure département
- Épieds, Maine-et-Loire, in the Maine-et-Loire département
- Épieds-en-Beauce, in the Loiret département
