= Boulay-les-Barres =

- Commune
- Coat of arms
- Location of Boulay-les-Barres
- Location within France Location within Centre-Val de Loire
- Coordinates: 47°58′52″N 1°47′04″E
- Country: France
- Region: Centre-Val de Loire
- Department: Loiret
- Arrondissement: Orléans
- Canton: Meung-sur-Loire

Government
  - Mayor (2020–2026): Bertrand Guillon
- Area^{1}: 12.45 km^{2} (4.81 sq mi)
- Highest elevation: 131 m (430 ft)
- Lowest elevation: 118 m (387 ft)
- Population (2023): 1,147
  - Density: 92.13/km^{2} (238.6/sq mi)
- Time zone: UTC+01:00 (CET)
  - Summer (DST): UTC+02:00 (CEST)
- INSEE/Postal code: 45046 /45140
- ^{1} French Land Register data, which excludes lakes, ponds, glaciers > 1 km^{2} (0.386 sq mi or 247 acres) and river estuaries.

Boulay-les-Barres (French pronunciation: [bulɛ le baʁ]) is a commune in the Loiret department in north-central France.

== Population ==
Historical population
Year	Pop.	±% p.a.
1968	483	—
1975	441	−1.29%
1982	444	+0.10%
1990	466	+0.61%
1999	551	+1.88%
2007	1,123	+9.31%
2012	1,079	−0.80%
2017	982	−1.87%
2023	1,147	+2.62%
Source: INSEE

== See also ==
- Communes of the Loiret department
