= Saint-Sigismond, Loiret =

Saint-Sigismond
- Commune
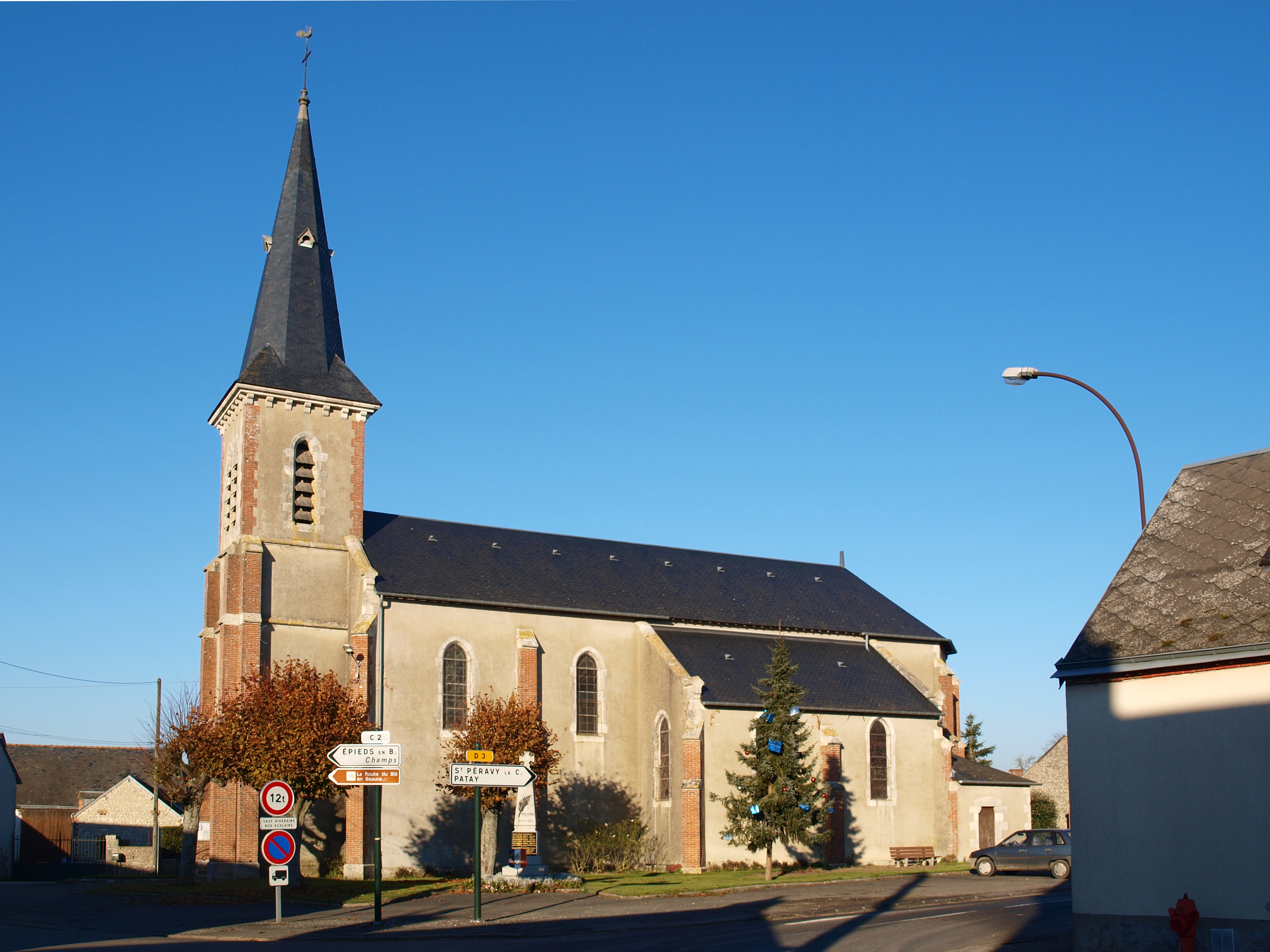
- The church in Saint-Sigismond

- Coat of arms
- Location of Saint-Sigismond
- Location within France Location within Centre-Val de Loire
- Coordinates: 47°58′55″N 1°40′52″E
- Country: France
- Region: Centre-Val de Loire
- Department: Loiret
- Arrondissement: Orléans
- Canton: Meung-sur-Loire

Government
  - Mayor (2020–2026): Isabelle Boissière
- Area^{1}: 14.93 km^{2} (5.76 sq mi)
- Elevation: 123 m (404 ft)
- Highest elevation: 125 m (410 ft)
- Lowest elevation: 117 m (384 ft)
- Population (2023): 269
  - Density: 18.0/km^{2} (46.7/sq mi)
- Time zone: UTC+01:00 (CET)
  - Summer (DST): UTC+02:00 (CEST)
- INSEE/Postal code: 45299 /45310
- ^{1} French Land Register data, which excludes lakes, ponds, glaciers > 1 km^{2} (0.386 sq mi or 247 acres) and river estuaries.

Saint-Sigismond (French pronunciation: [sɛ̃ siʒismɔ̃]) is a commune in the Loiret department in north-central France.

== See also ==
- Communes of the Loiret department
