= Coinces =

- Commune
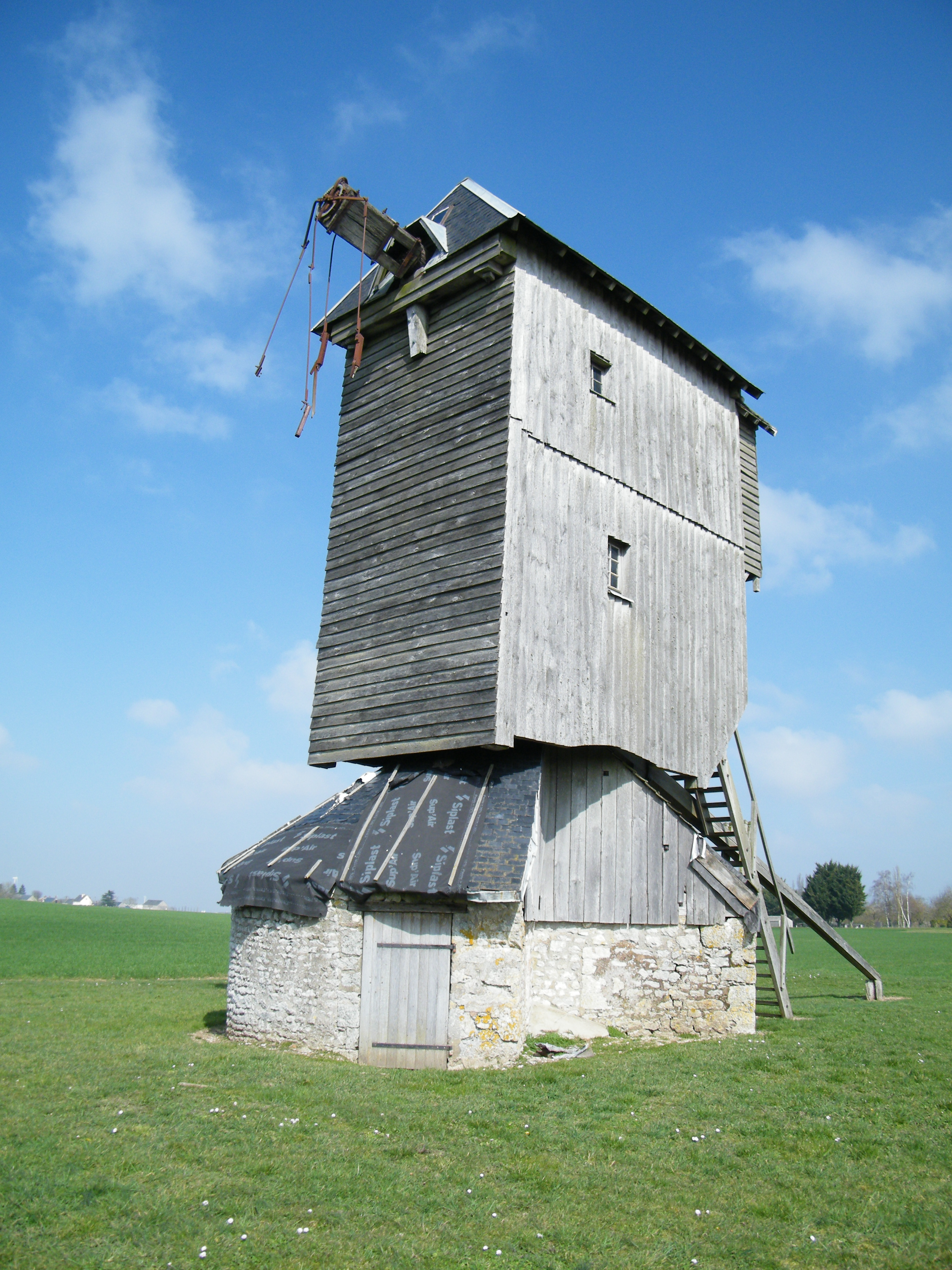
- The windmill in Coinces

- Coat of arms
- Location of Coinces
- Location within France Location within Centre-Val de Loire
- Coordinates: 48°00′39″N 1°44′28″E
- Country: France
- Region: Centre-Val de Loire
- Department: Loiret
- Arrondissement: Orléans
- Canton: Meung-sur-Loire

Government
  - Mayor (2020–2026): Alban Paillet
- Area^{1}: 21.63 km^{2} (8.35 sq mi)
- Highest elevation: 133 m (436 ft)
- Lowest elevation: 114 m (374 ft)
- Population (2023): 501
  - Density: 23.2/km^{2} (60.0/sq mi)
- Demonym: Coinçois
- Time zone: UTC+01:00 (CET)
  - Summer (DST): UTC+02:00 (CEST)
- INSEE/Postal code: 45099 /45310
- ^{1} French Land Register data, which excludes lakes, ponds, glaciers > 1 km^{2} (0.386 sq mi or 247 acres) and river estuaries.

Coinces (French pronunciation: [kwɛ̃s]) is a commune in the Loiret department in north-central France.

== See also ==
- Communes of the Loiret department
