= Le Bardon =

- Commune
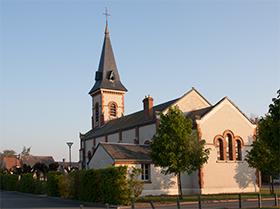
- The church in Le Bardon
- Location of Le Bardon
- Location within France Location within Centre-Val de Loire
- Coordinates: 47°50′42″N 1°39′08″E
- Country: France
- Region: Centre-Val de Loire
- Department: Loiret
- Arrondissement: Orléans
- Canton: Meung-sur-Loire

Government
  - Mayor (2020–2026): Michèle Mazy-Vilain
- Area^{1}: 12.23 km^{2} (4.72 sq mi)
- Highest elevation: 120 m (390 ft)
- Lowest elevation: 99 m (325 ft)
- Population (2023): 984
  - Density: 80.5/km^{2} (208/sq mi)
- Time zone: UTC+01:00 (CET)
  - Summer (DST): UTC+02:00 (CEST)
- INSEE/Postal code: 45020 /45130
- ^{1} French Land Register data, which excludes lakes, ponds, glaciers > 1 km^{2} (0.386 sq mi or 247 acres) and river estuaries.

Le Bardon (French pronunciation: [lə baʁdɔ̃]) is a commune in the Loiret department in north-central France.

== Population ==
Historical population
| Year | Pop. | ±% p.a. |
|---|---|---|
| 1968 | 538 | — |
| 1975 | 561 | +0.60% |
| 1982 | 724 | +3.71% |
| 1990 | 783 | +0.98% |
| 1999 | 818 | +0.49% |
| 2007 | 913 | +1.38% |
| 2012 | 1,044 | +2.72% |
| 2017 | 1,036 | −0.15% |
| 2023 | 984 | −0.85% |
Source: INSEE

== See also ==
- Communes of the Loiret department
