= Saint-Ay =

- Commune
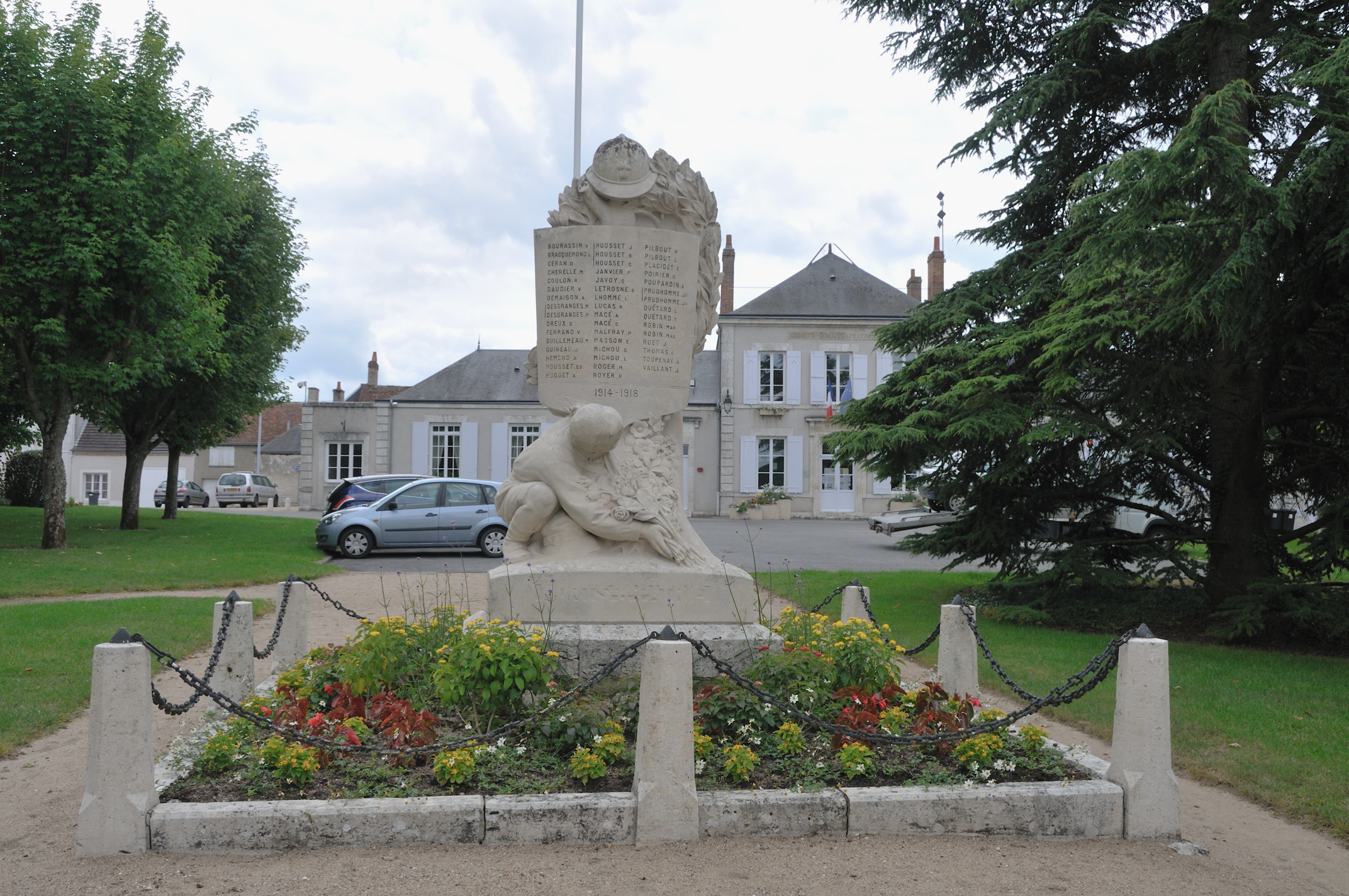
- The war memorial in the town hall square

- Coat of arms
- Location of Saint-Ay
- Location within France Location within Centre-Val de Loire
- Coordinates: 47°51′32″N 1°45′17″E
- Country: France
- Region: Centre-Val de Loire
- Department: Loiret
- Arrondissement: Orléans
- Canton: Meung-sur-Loire

Government
  - Mayor (2020–2026): Frédéric Cuillerier
- Area^{1}: 10.07 km^{2} (3.89 sq mi)
- Elevation: 100 m (330 ft)
- Highest elevation: 108 m (354 ft)
- Lowest elevation: 82 m (269 ft)
- Population (2023): 3,766
  - Density: 374.0/km^{2} (968.6/sq mi)
- Demonym(s): Agylien, Agylienne
- Time zone: UTC+01:00 (CET)
  - Summer (DST): UTC+02:00 (CEST)
- INSEE/Postal code: 45269 /45130
- ^{1} French Land Register data, which excludes lakes, ponds, glaciers > 1 km^{2} (0.386 sq mi or 247 acres) and river estuaries.

Saint-Ay (French pronunciation: [sɛ̃ti]) is a commune in the department of Loiret, and the administrative region of Centre-Val de Loire, France.

== Population ==
Historical population
Year	Pop.	±% p.a.
1968	1,138	—
1975	1,463	+3.65%
1982	3,008	+10.85%
1990	2,978	−0.13%
1999	2,966	−0.04%
2007	3,022	+0.23%
2012	3,188	+1.08%
2017	3,454	+1.62%
2023	3,766	+1.45%
Source: INSEE

== See also ==
- Communes of the Loiret department
