= Tournoisis =

- Commune
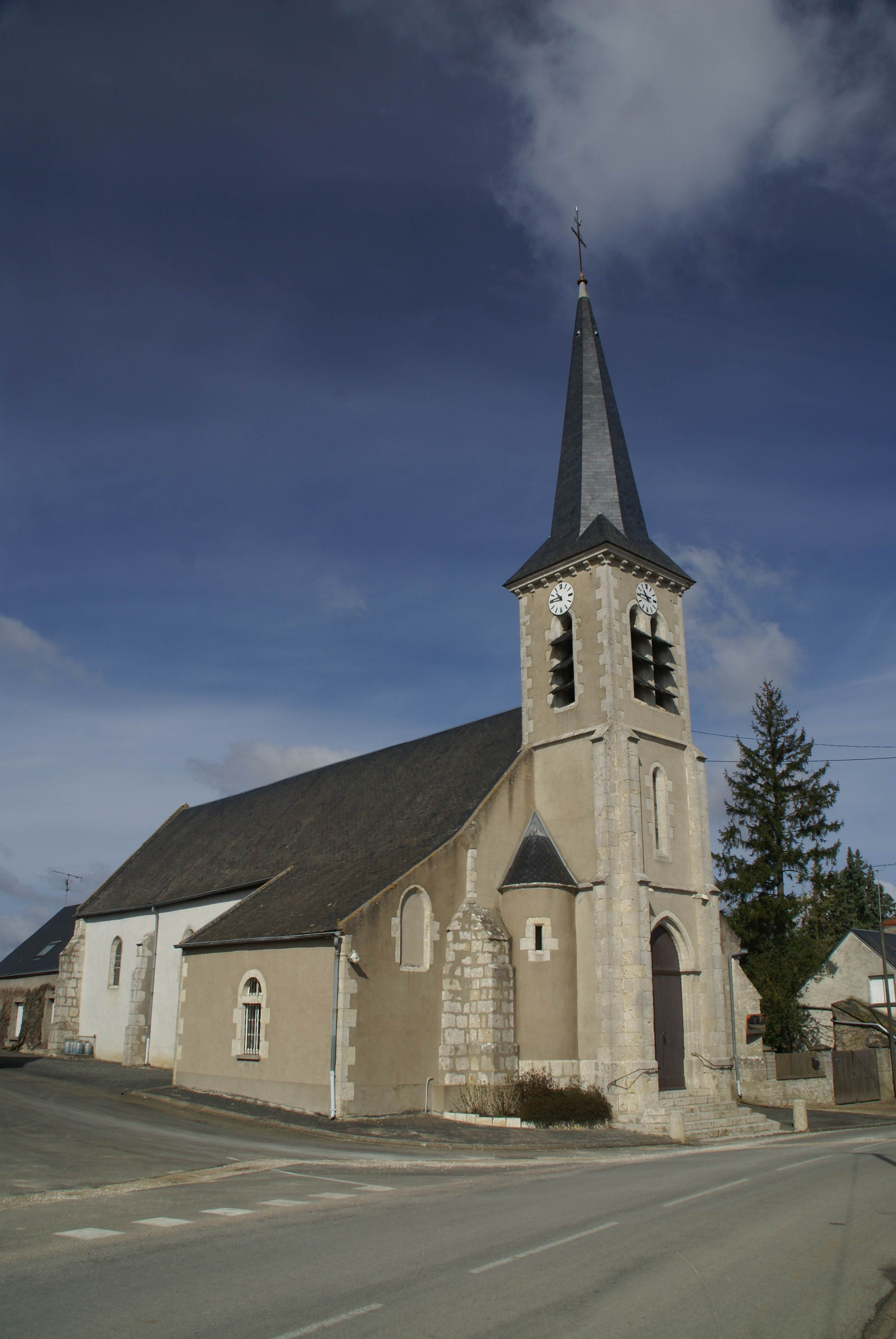
- The church in Tournoisis
- Location of Tournoisis
- Location within France Location within Centre-Val de Loire
- Coordinates: 48°00′23″N 1°37′52″E
- Country: France
- Region: Centre-Val de Loire
- Department: Loiret
- Arrondissement: Orléans
- Canton: Meung-sur-Loire

Government
  - Mayor (2020–2026): Muriel Bataille
- Area^{1}: 14.94 km^{2} (5.77 sq mi)
- Highest elevation: 131 m (430 ft)
- Lowest elevation: 117 m (384 ft)
- Population (2023): 370
  - Density: 25/km^{2} (64/sq mi)
- Time zone: UTC+01:00 (CET)
  - Summer (DST): UTC+02:00 (CEST)
- INSEE/Postal code: 45326 /45310
- ^{1} French Land Register data, which excludes lakes, ponds, glaciers > 1 km^{2} (0.386 sq mi or 247 acres) and river estuaries.

Tournoisis (French pronunciation: [tuʁnwazi]) is a commune in the Loiret department, Centre-Val de Loire region, north-central France.

== See also ==
- Communes of the Loiret department
