= Chevilly, Loiret =

Chevilly
- Commune
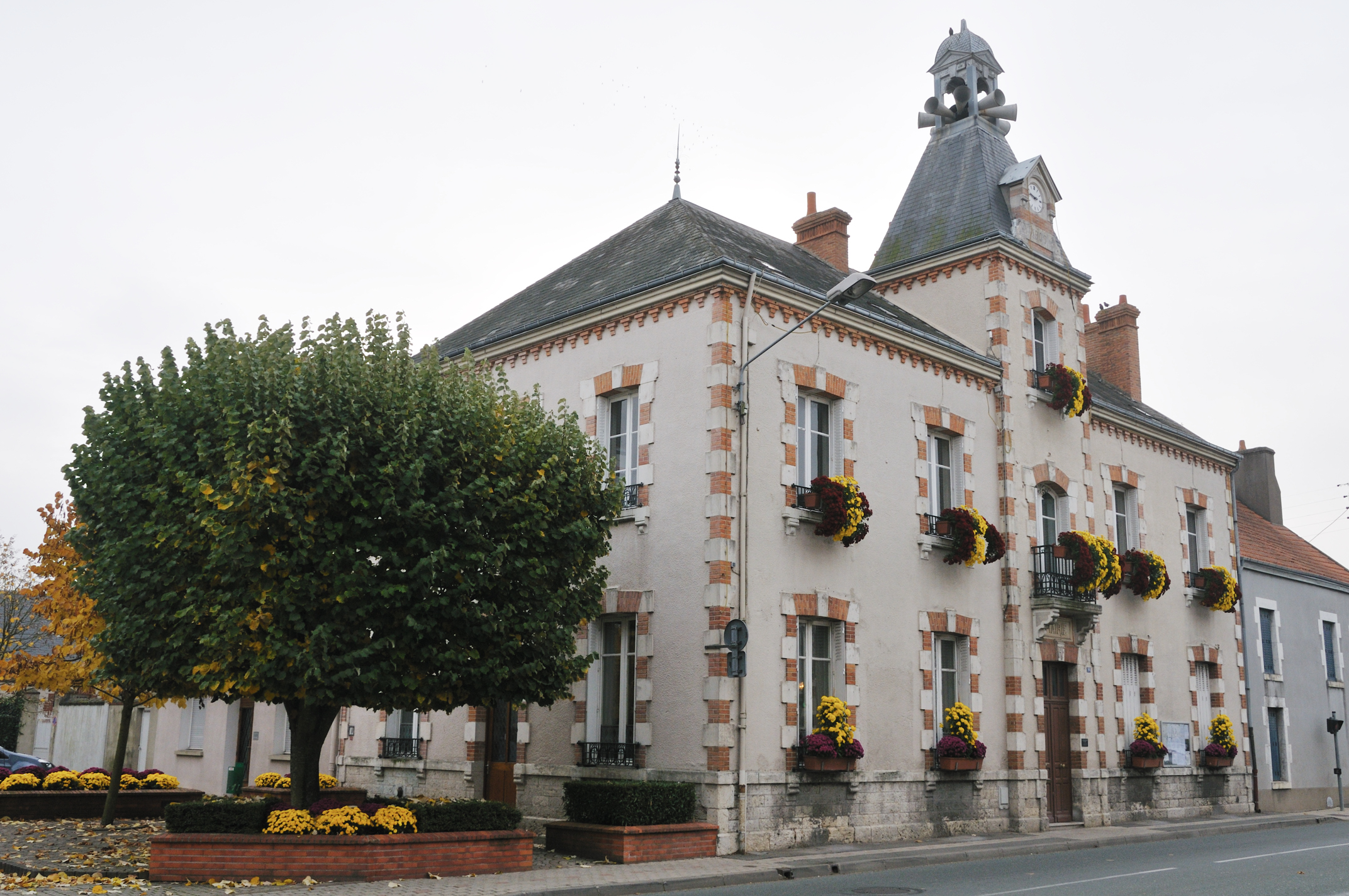
- The town hall in Chevilly

- Coat of arms
- Location of Chevilly
- Location within France Location within Centre-Val de Loire
- Coordinates: 48°01′47″N 1°52′29″E
- Country: France
- Region: Centre-Val de Loire
- Department: Loiret
- Arrondissement: Orléans
- Canton: Meung-sur-Loire

Government
  - Mayor (2020–2026): Hubert Jolliet
- Area^{1}: 41.76 km^{2} (16.12 sq mi)
- Highest elevation: 138 m (453 ft)
- Lowest elevation: 117 m (384 ft)
- Population (2023): 2,663
  - Density: 63.77/km^{2} (165.2/sq mi)
- Demonym: Chevillois
- Time zone: UTC+01:00 (CET)
  - Summer (DST): UTC+02:00 (CEST)
- INSEE/Postal code: 45093 /45520
- ^{1} French Land Register data, which excludes lakes, ponds, glaciers > 1 km^{2} (0.386 sq mi or 247 acres) and river estuaries.

Chevilly (French pronunciation: [ʃəviji]) is a commune in the Loiret department in north-central France. Chevilly station has rail connections to Orléans, Étampes and Paris.

== Population ==
Historical population
Year	Pop.	±% p.a.
1968	1,456	—
1975	2,073	+5.18%
1982	2,626	+3.44%
1990	2,485	−0.69%
1999	2,382	−0.47%
2007	2,410	+0.15%
2012	2,647	+1.89%
2017	2,662	+0.11%
2023	2,663	+0.01%
Source: INSEE

== See also ==
- Communes of the Loiret department
