= Saint-Péravy-la-Colombe =

- Commune
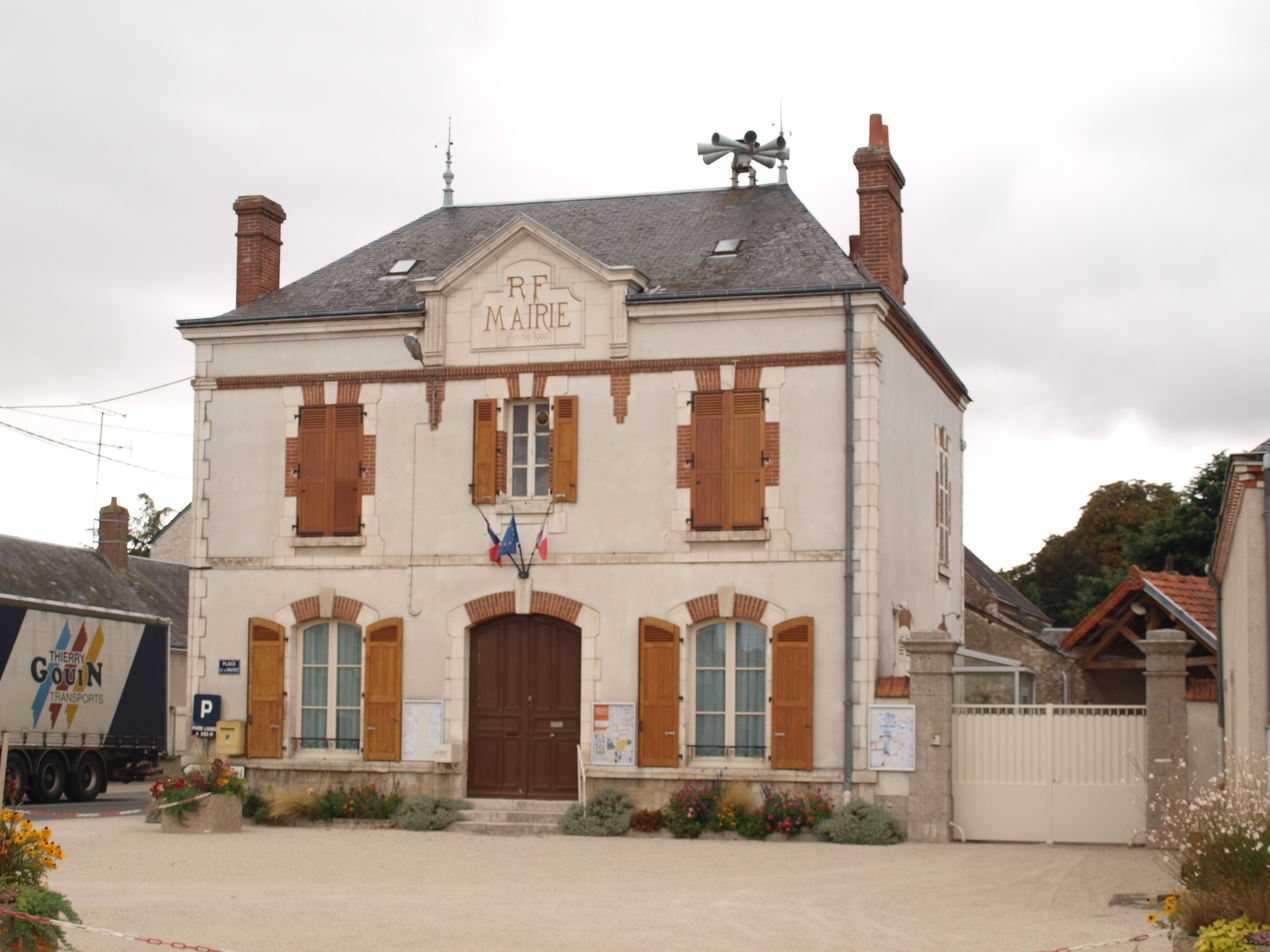
- The town hall in Saint-Péravy-la-Colombe
- Location of Saint-Péravy-la-Colombe
- Location within France Location within Centre-Val de Loire
- Coordinates: 48°00′04″N 1°42′01″E
- Country: France
- Region: Centre-Val de Loire
- Department: Loiret
- Arrondissement: Orléans
- Canton: Meung-sur-Loire

Government
  - Mayor (2020–2026): Denis Pelé
- Area^{1}: 18.96 km^{2} (7.32 sq mi)
- Elevation: 125 m (410 ft)
- Highest elevation: 131 m (430 ft)
- Lowest elevation: 114 m (374 ft)
- Population (2023): 777
  - Density: 41.0/km^{2} (106/sq mi)
- Time zone: UTC+01:00 (CET)
  - Summer (DST): UTC+02:00 (CEST)
- INSEE/Postal code: 45296 /45310
- ^{1} French Land Register data, which excludes lakes, ponds, glaciers > 1 km^{2} (0.386 sq mi or 247 acres) and river estuaries.

Saint-Péravy-la-Colombe (French pronunciation: [sɛ̃ peʁavi la kɔlɔ̃b]) is a commune in the Loiret department in north-central France.

== See also ==
- Communes of the Loiret department
