= Bricy =

- Commune
- Location of Bricy
- Location within France Location within Centre-Val de Loire
- Coordinates: 47°59′57″N 1°46′56″E
- Country: France
- Region: Centre-Val de Loire
- Department: Loiret
- Arrondissement: Orléans
- Canton: Meung-sur-Loire

Government
  - Mayor (2020–2026): Louis-Robert Perdereau
- Area^{1}: 12.66 km^{2} (4.89 sq mi)
- Highest elevation: 131 m (430 ft)
- Lowest elevation: 116 m (381 ft)
- Population (2023): 528
  - Density: 41.7/km^{2} (108/sq mi)
- Time zone: UTC+01:00 (CET)
  - Summer (DST): UTC+02:00 (CEST)
- INSEE/Postal code: 45055 /45310
- ^{1} French Land Register data, which excludes lakes, ponds, glaciers > 1 km^{2} (0.386 sq mi or 247 acres) and river estuaries.

Bricy (French pronunciation: [bʁisi]) is a commune in the Loiret department in north-central France.

== Population ==
Historical population
Year	Pop.	±% p.a.
1968	755	—
1975	703	−1.01%
1982	487	−5.11%
1990	456	−0.82%
1999	552	+2.15%
2007	594	+0.92%
2012	548	−1.60%
2017	554	+0.22%
2023	528	−0.80%
Source: INSEE

== See also ==
- Communes of the Loiret department
