= Charsonville =

- Commune
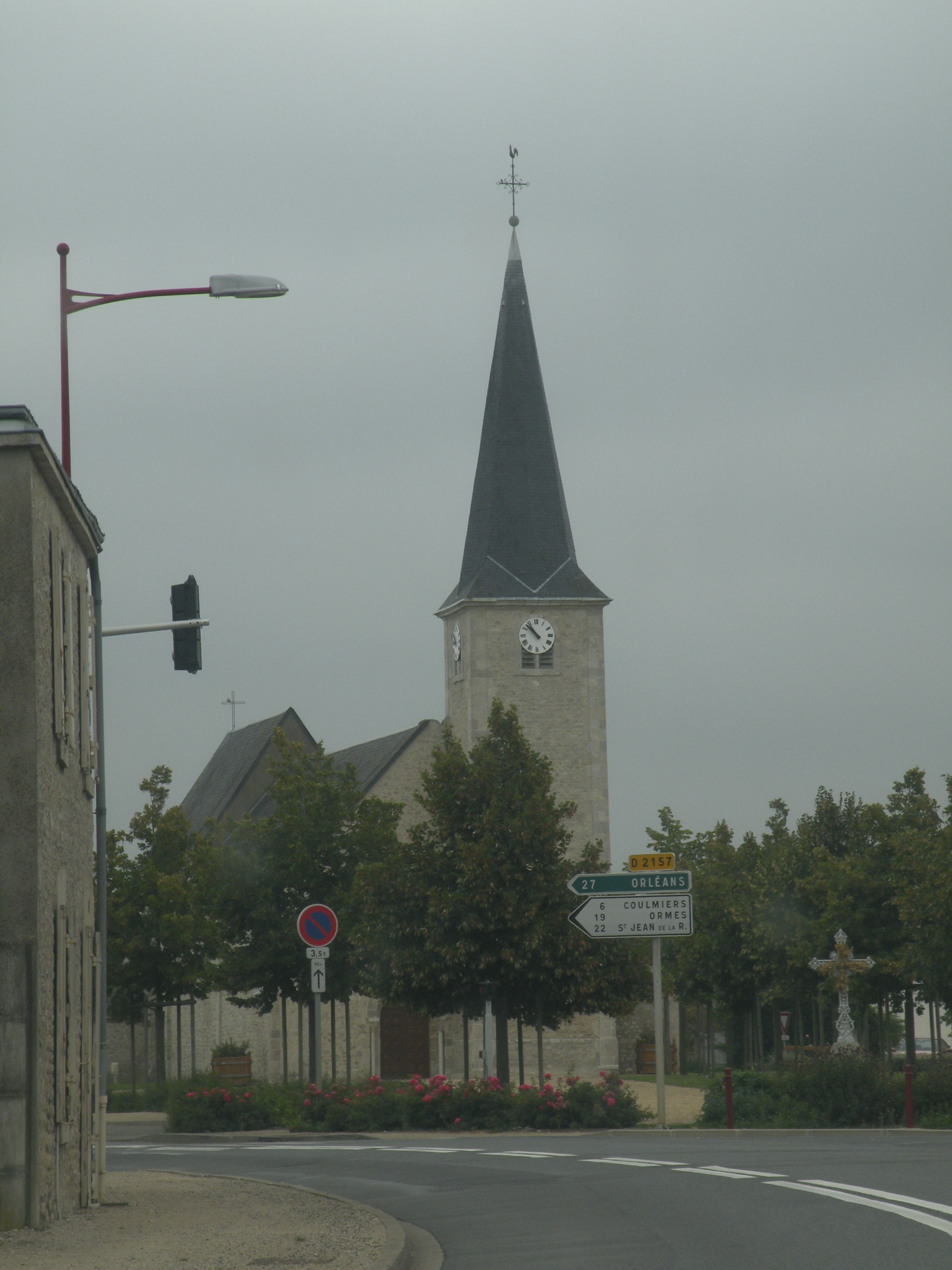
- The church in Charsonville

- Coat of arms
- Location of Charsonville
- Location within France Location within Centre-Val de Loire
- Coordinates: 47°55′46″N 1°34′51″E
- Country: France
- Region: Centre-Val de Loire
- Department: Loiret
- Arrondissement: Orléans
- Canton: Meung-sur-Loire

Government
  - Mayor (2020–2026): Bruno Vivier
- Area^{1}: 24.55 km^{2} (9.48 sq mi)
- Highest elevation: 131 m (430 ft)
- Lowest elevation: 110 m (360 ft)
- Population (2023): 609
  - Density: 24.8/km^{2} (64.2/sq mi)
- Demonym: Charsonvillois
- Time zone: UTC+01:00 (CET)
  - Summer (DST): UTC+02:00 (CEST)
- INSEE/Postal code: 45081 /45130
- ^{1} French Land Register data, which excludes lakes, ponds, glaciers > 1 km^{2} (0.386 sq mi or 247 acres) and river estuaries.

Charsonville (French pronunciation: [ʃaʁsɔ̃vil]) is a commune in the Loiret department in north-central France.

== See also ==
- Communes of the Loiret department
