= Trinay =

- Commune
- Location of Trinay
- Location within France Location within Centre-Val de Loire
- Coordinates: 48°05′11″N 1°57′14″E
- Country: France
- Region: Centre-Val de Loire
- Department: Loiret
- Arrondissement: Orléans
- Canton: Meung-sur-Loire

Government
  - Mayor (2020–2026): Christophe Souchet
- Area^{1}: 17.22 km^{2} (6.65 sq mi)
- Highest elevation: 132 m (433 ft)
- Lowest elevation: 120 m (390 ft)
- Population (2023): 208
  - Density: 12.1/km^{2} (31.3/sq mi)
- Time zone: UTC+01:00 (CET)
  - Summer (DST): UTC+02:00 (CEST)
- INSEE/Postal code: 45330 /45410
- ^{1} French Land Register data, which excludes lakes, ponds, glaciers > 1 km^{2} (0.386 sq mi or 247 acres) and river estuaries.

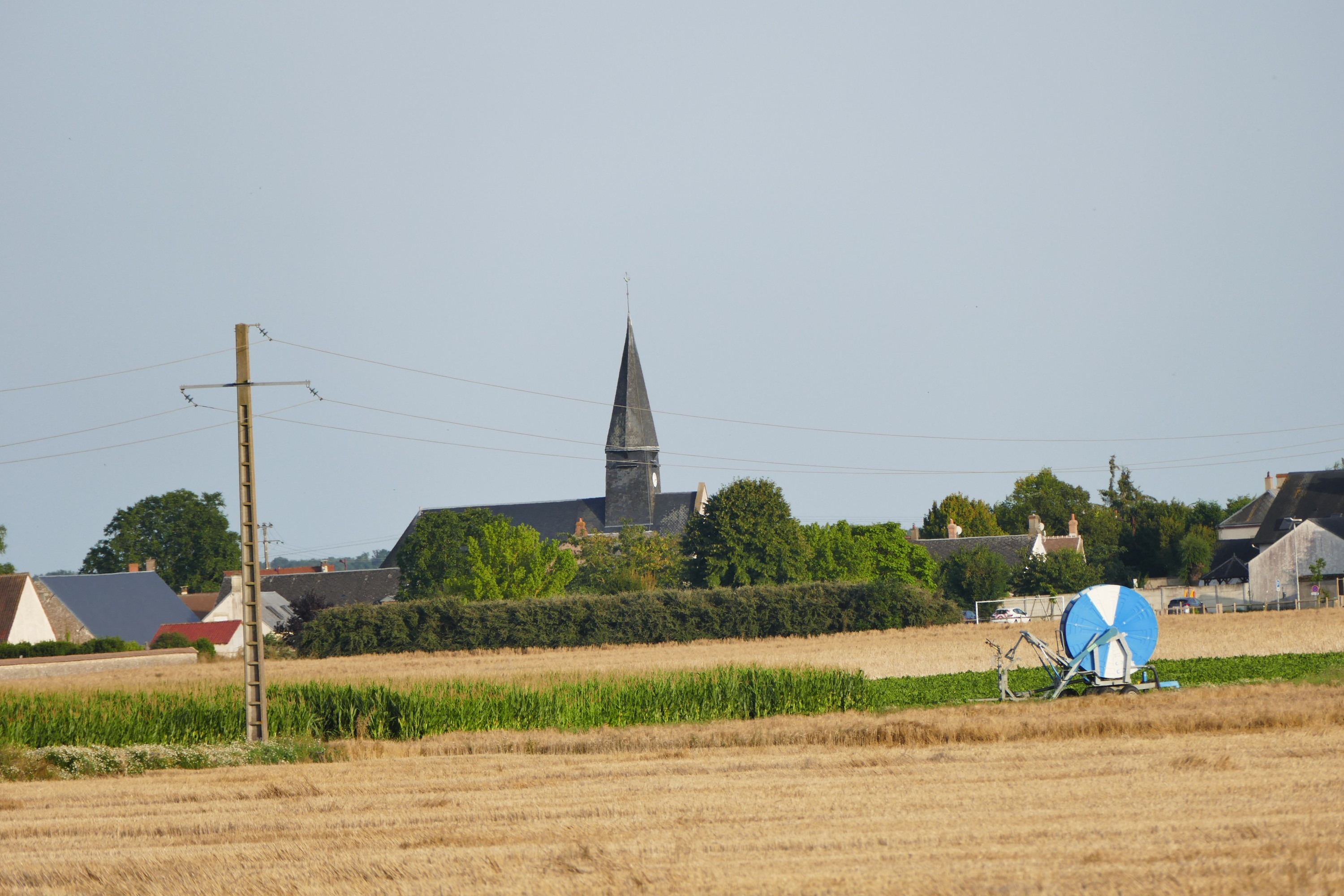
Trinay - Saint-Denis-et-Saint-Éloi Church

Trinay (French pronunciation: [tʁinɛ]) is a commune in the Loiret department in north-central France.

== See also ==
- Communes of the Loiret department
