= Villeneuve-sur-Conie =

- Commune
- Location of Villeneuve-sur-Conie
- Location within France Location within Centre-Val de Loire
- Coordinates: 48°02′44″N 1°39′06″E
- Country: France
- Region: Centre-Val de Loire
- Department: Loiret
- Arrondissement: Orléans
- Canton: Meung-sur-Loire

Government
  - Mayor (2020–2026): Sylvie Cisse
- Area^{1}: 17.97 km^{2} (6.94 sq mi)
- Highest elevation: 134 m (440 ft)
- Lowest elevation: 112 m (367 ft)
- Population (2023): 190
  - Density: 11/km^{2} (27/sq mi)
- Time zone: UTC+01:00 (CET)
  - Summer (DST): UTC+02:00 (CEST)
- INSEE/Postal code: 45341 /45310
- ^{1} French Land Register data, which excludes lakes, ponds, glaciers > 1 km^{2} (0.386 sq mi or 247 acres) and river estuaries.

Villeneuve-sur-Conie (French pronunciation: [vilnœv syʁ kɔni]) is a commune in the Loiret department in north-central France.

== See also ==
- Communes of the Loiret department
