= Huêtre =

- Commune
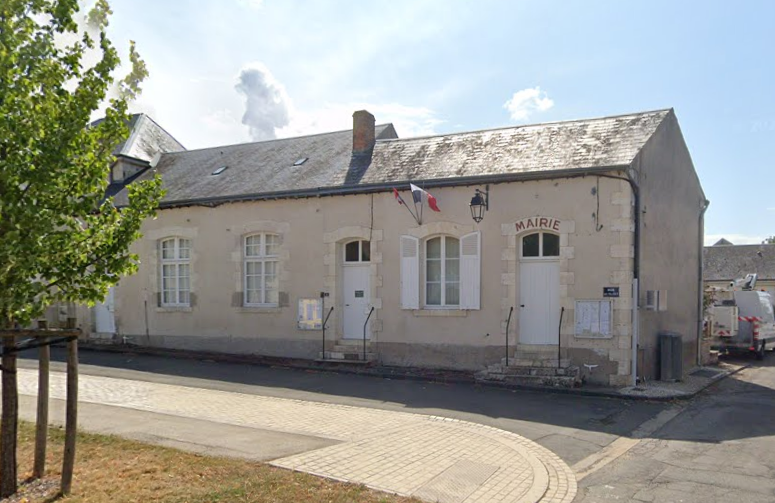
- Huêtre Town hall
- Location of Huêtre
- Location within France Location within Centre-Val de Loire
- Coordinates: 48°01′05″N 1°47′45″E
- Country: France
- Region: Centre-Val de Loire
- Department: Loiret
- Arrondissement: Orléans
- Canton: Meung-sur-Loire

Government
  - Mayor (2020–2026): Thierry Bracquemond
- Area^{1}: 13.15 km^{2} (5.08 sq mi)
- Highest elevation: 134 m (440 ft)
- Lowest elevation: 116 m (381 ft)
- Population (2023): 280
  - Density: 21/km^{2} (55/sq mi)
- Demonym: Huêtrais
- Time zone: UTC+01:00 (CET)
  - Summer (DST): UTC+02:00 (CEST)
- INSEE/Postal code: 45166 /45520
- ^{1} French Land Register data, which excludes lakes, ponds, glaciers > 1 km^{2} (0.386 sq mi or 247 acres) and river estuaries.

Huêtre (French pronunciation: [ɥɛtʁ]) is a commune in the Loiret department in north-central France.

== See also ==
- Communes of the Loiret department
