= Férolles =

- Commune
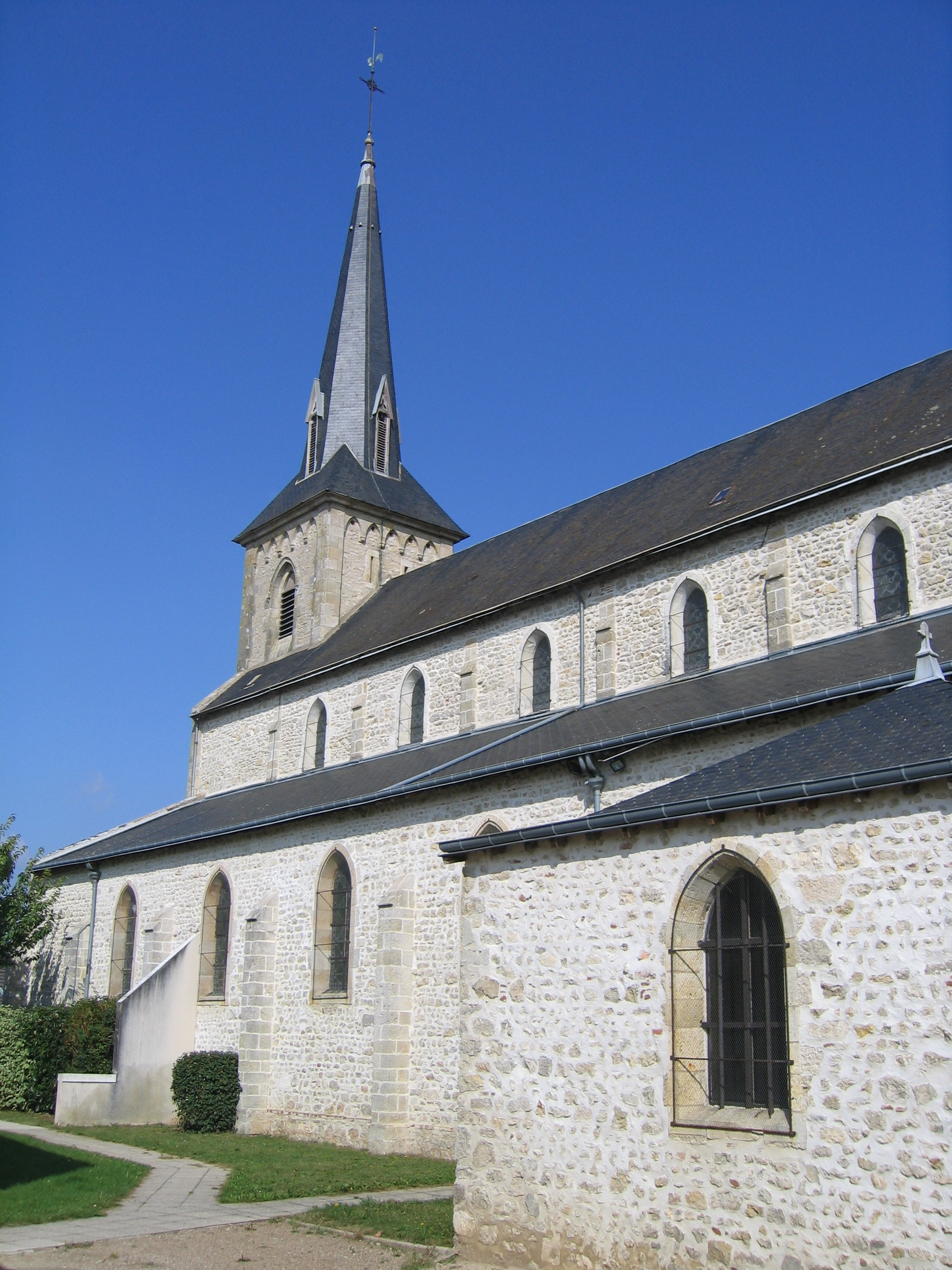
- The church in Férolles
- Location of Férolles
- Location within France Location within Centre-Val de Loire
- Coordinates: 47°50′08″N 2°06′40″E
- Country: France
- Region: Centre-Val de Loire
- Department: Loiret
- Arrondissement: Orléans
- Canton: Saint-Jean-le-Blanc

Government
  - Mayor (2020–2026): David Dupuis
- Area^{1}: 17.05 km^{2} (6.58 sq mi)
- Highest elevation: 107 m (351 ft)
- Lowest elevation: 99 m (325 ft)
- Population (2023): 1,127
  - Density: 66.10/km^{2} (171.2/sq mi)
- Demonym: Férolliots
- Time zone: UTC+01:00 (CET)
  - Summer (DST): UTC+02:00 (CEST)
- INSEE/Postal code: 45144 /45150
- Website: www.ferolles.fr
- ^{1} French Land Register data, which excludes lakes, ponds, glaciers > 1 km^{2} (0.386 sq mi or 247 acres) and river estuaries.

Férolles (French pronunciation: [feʁɔl]) is a commune in the Loiret department in north-central France. It is located in the Loire Valley, 19 km (12 mi) southeast of Orleans, 4 km (2.5 mi) south of the Loire and 123 km (76 mi) south of Paris.

== See also ==
- Communes of the Loiret department
