= Chaingy =

- Commune
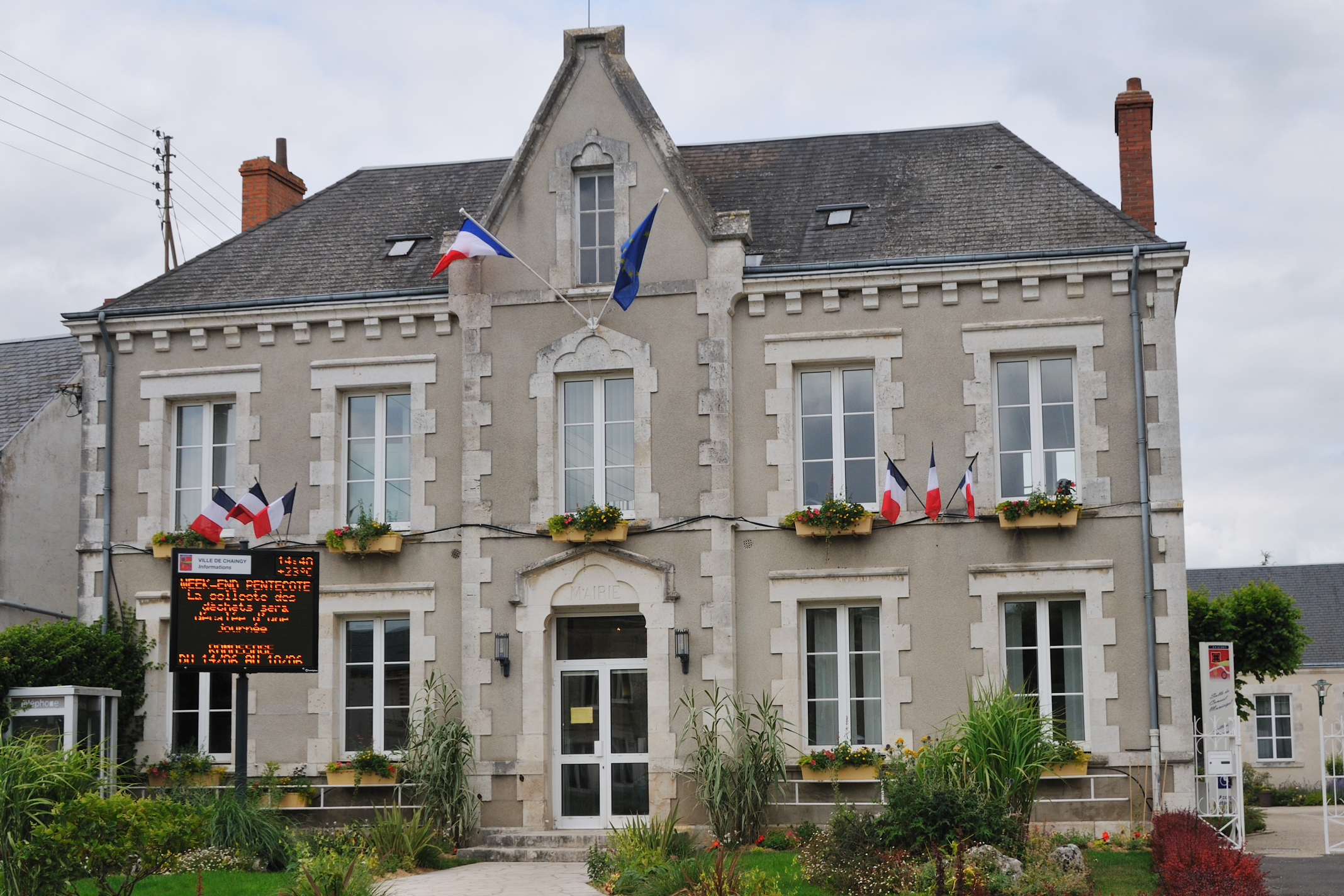
- The town hall in Chaingy

- Coat of arms
- Location of Chaingy
- Location within France Location within Centre-Val de Loire
- Coordinates: 47°53′04″N 1°46′25″E
- Country: France
- Region: Centre-Val de Loire
- Department: Loiret
- Arrondissement: Orléans
- Canton: Meung-sur-Loire
- Intercommunality: Terres du Val de Loire

Government
  - Mayor (2020–2026): Jean-Pierre Durand
- Area^{1}: 21.69 km^{2} (8.37 sq mi)
- Highest elevation: 124 m (407 ft)
- Lowest elevation: 82 m (269 ft)
- Population (2023): 4,116
  - Density: 189.8/km^{2} (491.5/sq mi)
- Demonym: Cambiens
- Time zone: UTC+01:00 (CET)
  - Summer (DST): UTC+02:00 (CEST)
- INSEE/Postal code: 45067 /45380
- Website: www.chaingy.fr
- ^{1} French Land Register data, which excludes lakes, ponds, glaciers > 1 km^{2} (0.386 sq mi or 247 acres) and river estuaries.

Chaingy (French pronunciation: [ʃɛ̃ʒi]) is a commune in the department of Loiret, Centre-Val de Loire, France.

== Population ==
Historical population
Year	Pop.	±% p.a.
1968	1,574	—
1975	1,896	+2.69%
1982	2,562	+4.39%
1990	2,641	+0.38%
1999	2,859	+0.89%
2007	3,458	+2.41%
2012	3,551	+0.53%
2017	3,663	+0.62%
2023	4,116	+1.96%
Source: INSEE

== See also ==
- Communes of the Loiret department
