= Sigloy =

- Commune
- Coat of arms
- Location of Sigloy
- Location within France Location within Centre-Val de Loire
- Coordinates: 47°50′01″N 2°13′36″E
- Country: France
- Region: Centre-Val de Loire
- Department: Loiret
- Arrondissement: Orléans
- Canton: Saint-Jean-le-Blanc
- Intercommunality: Loges

Government
  - Mayor (2020–2026): Vincent Asselin
- Area^{1}: 9.46 km^{2} (3.65 sq mi)
- Highest elevation: 110 m (360 ft)
- Lowest elevation: 102 m (335 ft)
- Population (2023): 654
  - Density: 69.1/km^{2} (179/sq mi)
- Time zone: UTC+01:00 (CET)
  - Summer (DST): UTC+02:00 (CEST)
- INSEE/Postal code: 45311 /45110
- ^{1} French Land Register data, which excludes lakes, ponds, glaciers > 1 km^{2} (0.386 sq mi or 247 acres) and river estuaries.

Sigloy (French pronunciation: [siɡlwa]) is a commune in the Loiret department in north-central France.

== See also ==
- Communes of the Loiret department
