= Ouvrouer-les-Champs =

- Commune
- Location of Ouvrouer-les-Champs
- Location within France Location within Centre-Val de Loire
- Coordinates: 47°49′59″N 2°10′46″E
- Country: France
- Region: Centre-Val de Loire
- Department: Loiret
- Arrondissement: Orléans
- Canton: Saint-Jean-le-Blanc
- Intercommunality: Loges

Government
  - Mayor (2020–2026): Laurence Monnot
- Area^{1}: 10.54 km^{2} (4.07 sq mi)
- Highest elevation: 108 m (354 ft)
- Lowest elevation: 100 m (330 ft)
- Population (2023): 536
  - Density: 50.9/km^{2} (132/sq mi)
- Time zone: UTC+01:00 (CET)
  - Summer (DST): UTC+02:00 (CEST)
- INSEE/Postal code: 45241 /45150
- ^{1} French Land Register data, which excludes lakes, ponds, glaciers > 1 km^{2} (0.386 sq mi or 247 acres) and river estuaries.

Ouvrouer-les-Champs (French pronunciation: [uvʁuɛʁ le ʃɑ̃]) is a commune in the Loiret department in north-central France.

== See also ==
- Communes of the Loiret department
