= Artenay =

- Commune
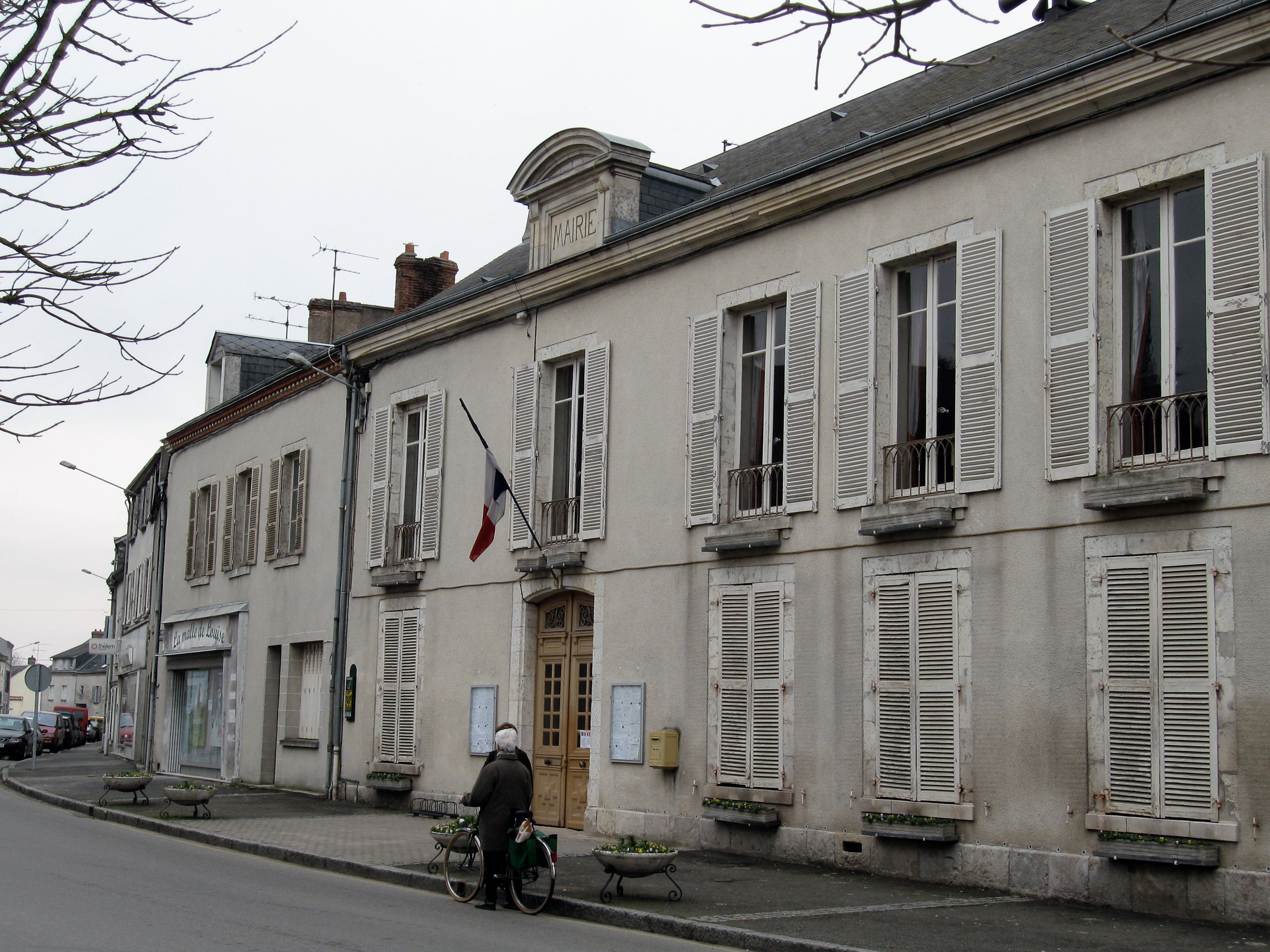
- Town hall

- Coat of arms
- Location of Artenay
- Location within France Location within Centre-Val de Loire
- Coordinates: 48°04′59″N 1°52′45″E
- Country: France
- Region: Centre-Val de Loire
- Department: Loiret
- Arrondissement: Orléans
- Canton: Meung-sur-Loire
- Intercommunality: CC Beauce Loirétaine

Government
  - Mayor (2020–2026): David Jacquet
- Area^{1}: 20.5 km^{2} (7.9 sq mi)
- Highest elevation: 129 m (423 ft)
- Lowest elevation: 117 m (384 ft)
- Population (2023): 1,997
  - Density: 97.4/km^{2} (252/sq mi)
- Time zone: UTC+01:00 (CET)
  - Summer (DST): UTC+02:00 (CEST)
- INSEE/Postal code: 45008 /45410
- ^{1} French Land Register data, which excludes lakes, ponds, glaciers > 1 km^{2} (0.386 sq mi or 247 acres) and river estuaries.

Artenay (French pronunciation: [aʁtənɛ]) is a commune in the Loiret department, north-central France. Artenay station has rail connections to Orléans, Étampes and Paris.

== Population ==
Historical population
Year	Pop.	±% p.a.
1968	1,514	—
1975	1,589	+0.69%
1982	1,939	+2.88%
1990	2,008	+0.44%
1999	1,945	−0.35%
2007	1,716	−1.55%
2012	1,835	+1.35%
2017	1,890	+0.59%
2023	1,997	+0.92%
Source: INSEE

== See also ==
- Communes of the Loiret department
