= Vienne-en-Val =

Commune in Centre-Val de Loire, France

- Commune
- Location of Vienne-en-Val
- Location within France Location within Centre-Val de Loire
- Coordinates: 47°48′06″N 2°08′14″E
- Country: France
- Region: Centre-Val de Loire
- Department: Loiret
- Arrondissement: Orléans
- Canton: Saint-Jean-le-Blanc
- Intercommunality: Loges

Government
  - Mayor (2020–2026): Pascal Semonsut
- Area^{1}: 35.94 km^{2} (13.88 sq mi)
- Highest elevation: 142 m (466 ft)
- Lowest elevation: 99 m (325 ft)
- Population (2023): 2,004
  - Density: 55.76/km^{2} (144.4/sq mi)
- Demonym: Viennois
- Time zone: UTC+01:00 (CET)
  - Summer (DST): UTC+02:00 (CEST)
- INSEE/Postal code: 45335 /45510
- Website: www.vienne-en-val.fr
- ^{1} French Land Register data, which excludes lakes, ponds, glaciers > 1 km^{2} (0.386 sq mi or 247 acres) and river estuaries.

Vienne-en-Val (French pronunciation: [vjɛn ɑ̃ val]) is a commune in the Loiret department in north-central France.

== Population ==
Historical population
Year	Pop.	±% p.a.
1968	565	—
1975	601	+0.89%
1982	1,463	+13.55%
1990	1,481	+0.15%
1999	1,549	+0.50%
2007	1,715	+1.28%
2012	1,969	+2.80%
2017	1,942	−0.28%
2023	2,004	+0.53%
Source: INSEE

== See also ==
- Communes of the Loiret department
