= Gémigny =

- Commune
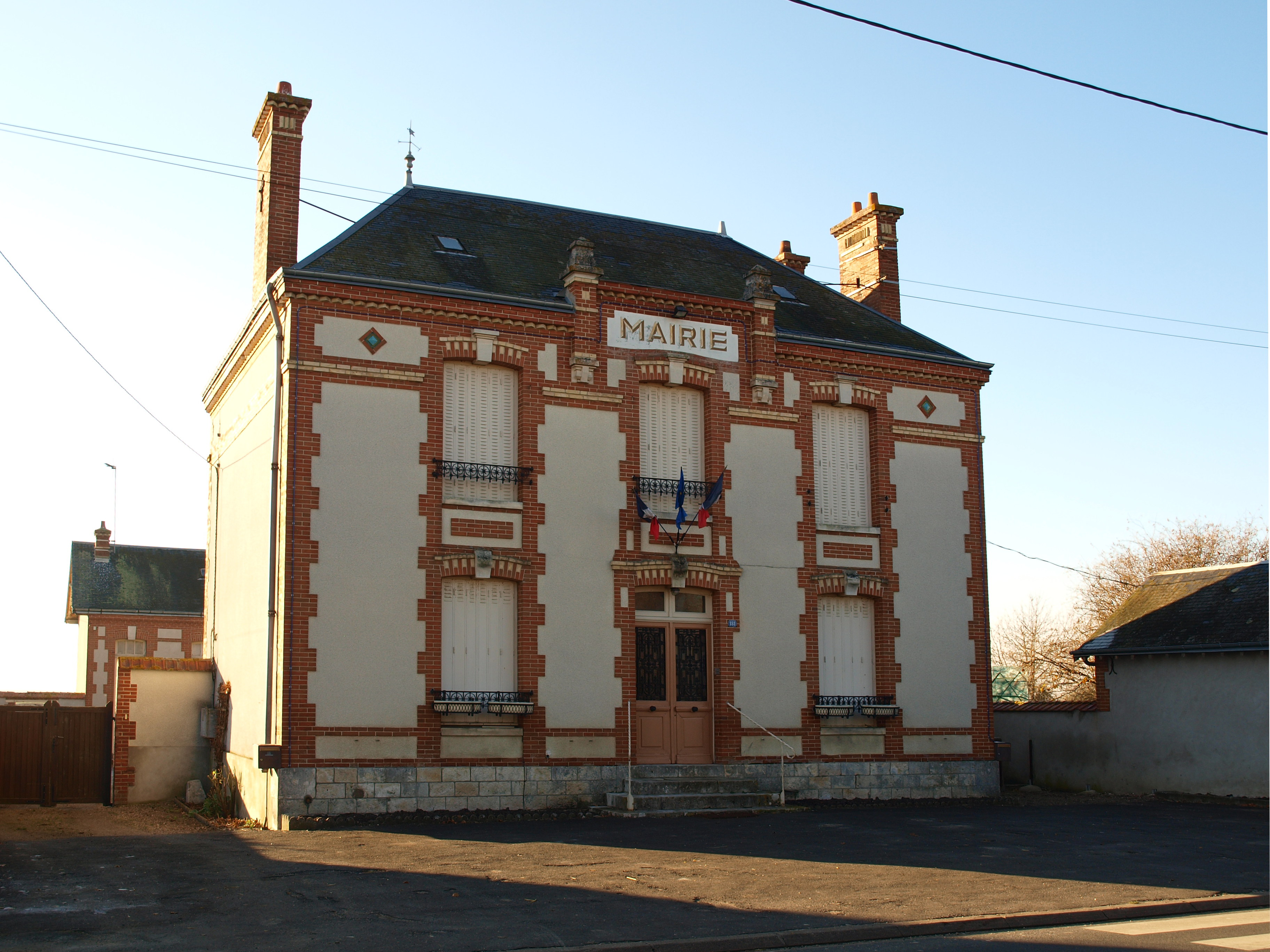
- The town hall in Gémigny

- Coat of arms
- Location of Gémigny
- Location within France Location within Centre-Val de Loire
- Coordinates: 47°57′53″N 1°41′46″E
- Country: France
- Region: Centre-Val de Loire
- Department: Loiret
- Arrondissement: Orléans
- Canton: Meung-sur-Loire

Government
  - Mayor (2020–2026): Joël Caillard
- Area^{1}: 14.17 km^{2} (5.47 sq mi)
- Highest elevation: 129 m (423 ft)
- Lowest elevation: 114 m (374 ft)
- Population (2023): 217
  - Density: 15.3/km^{2} (39.7/sq mi)
- Demonym: Gémignois
- Time zone: UTC+01:00 (CET)
  - Summer (DST): UTC+02:00 (CEST)
- INSEE/Postal code: 45152 /45310
- ^{1} French Land Register data, which excludes lakes, ponds, glaciers > 1 km^{2} (0.386 sq mi or 247 acres) and river estuaries.

Gémigny (French pronunciation: [ʒemiɲi]) is a commune in the Loiret department in north-central France.

== See also ==
- Communes of the Loiret department
