= Tigy =

- Commune
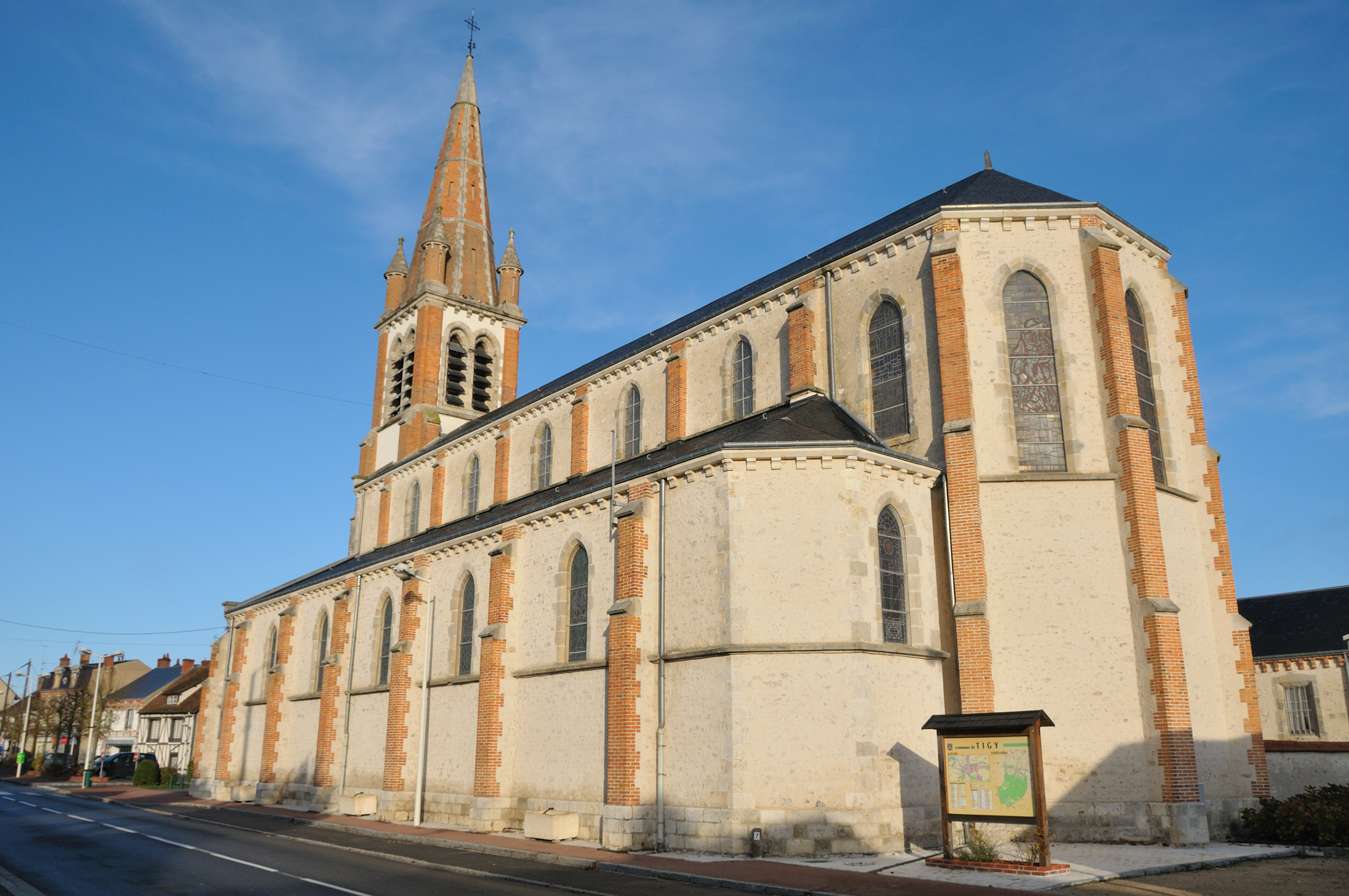
- The church in Tigy

- Coat of arms
- Location of Tigy
- Location within France Location within Centre-Val de Loire
- Coordinates: 47°47′45″N 2°11′57″E
- Country: France
- Region: Centre-Val de Loire
- Department: Loiret
- Arrondissement: Orléans
- Canton: Saint-Jean-le-Blanc
- Intercommunality: Loges

Government
  - Mayor (2020–2026): Noël Le Goff
- Area^{1}: 47.29 km^{2} (18.26 sq mi)
- Highest elevation: 149 m (489 ft)
- Lowest elevation: 104 m (341 ft)
- Population (2023): 2,484
  - Density: 52.53/km^{2} (136.0/sq mi)
- Time zone: UTC+01:00 (CET)
  - Summer (DST): UTC+02:00 (CEST)
- INSEE/Postal code: 45324 /45510
- ^{1} French Land Register data, which excludes lakes, ponds, glaciers > 1 km^{2} (0.386 sq mi or 247 acres) and river estuaries.

Tigy (French pronunciation: [tiʒi]) is a commune in the Loiret department in north-central France.

== Population ==
Historical population
Year	Pop.	±% p.a.
1968	1,259	—
1975	1,251	−0.09%
1982	1,434	+1.97%
1990	1,679	+1.99%
1999	1,960	+1.73%
2007	2,192	+1.41%
2012	2,297	+0.94%
2017	2,315	+0.16%
2023	2,484	+1.18%
Source: INSEE

== See also ==
- Communes of the Loiret department
