= Rozières-en-Beauce =

- Commune
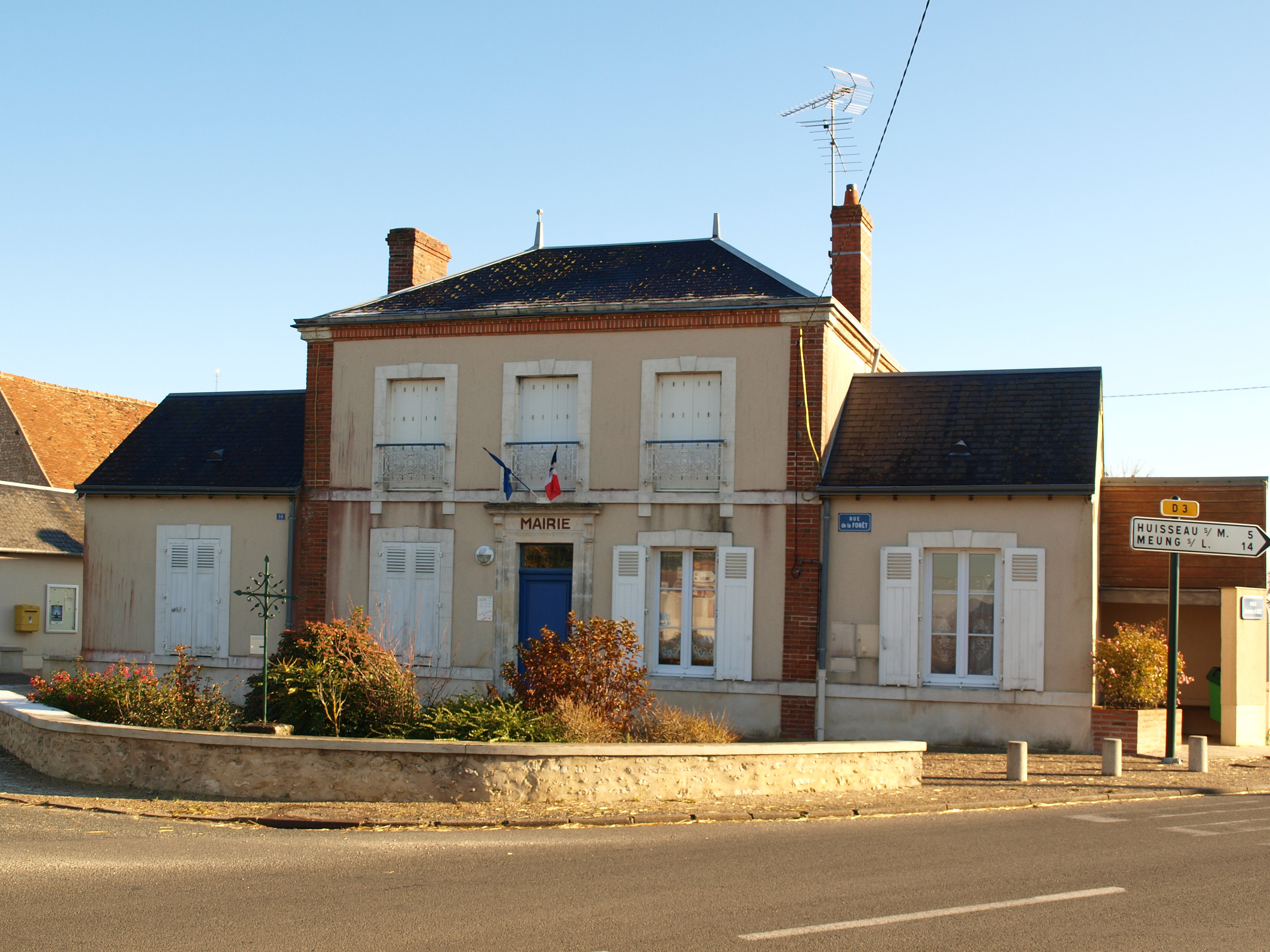
- The town hall in Rozières-en-Beauce
- Location of Rozières-en-Beauce
- Location within France Location within Centre-Val de Loire
- Coordinates: 47°56′33″N 1°42′09″E
- Country: France
- Region: Centre-Val de Loire
- Department: Loiret
- Arrondissement: Orléans
- Canton: Meung-sur-Loire

Government
  - Mayor (2020–2026): Hervé Lefevre
- Area^{1}: 9.17 km^{2} (3.54 sq mi)
- Highest elevation: 124 m (407 ft)
- Lowest elevation: 107 m (351 ft)
- Population (2023): 183
  - Density: 20.0/km^{2} (51.7/sq mi)
- Time zone: UTC+01:00 (CET)
  - Summer (DST): UTC+02:00 (CEST)
- INSEE/Postal code: 45264 /45130
- ^{1} French Land Register data, which excludes lakes, ponds, glaciers > 1 km^{2} (0.386 sq mi or 247 acres) and river estuaries.

Rozières-en-Beauce (French pronunciation: [ʁozjɛʁ ɑ̃ bos], literally Rozières in Beauce) is a commune in the Loiret department in north-central France.

== See also ==
- Communes of the Loiret department
