= Cercottes =

- Commune
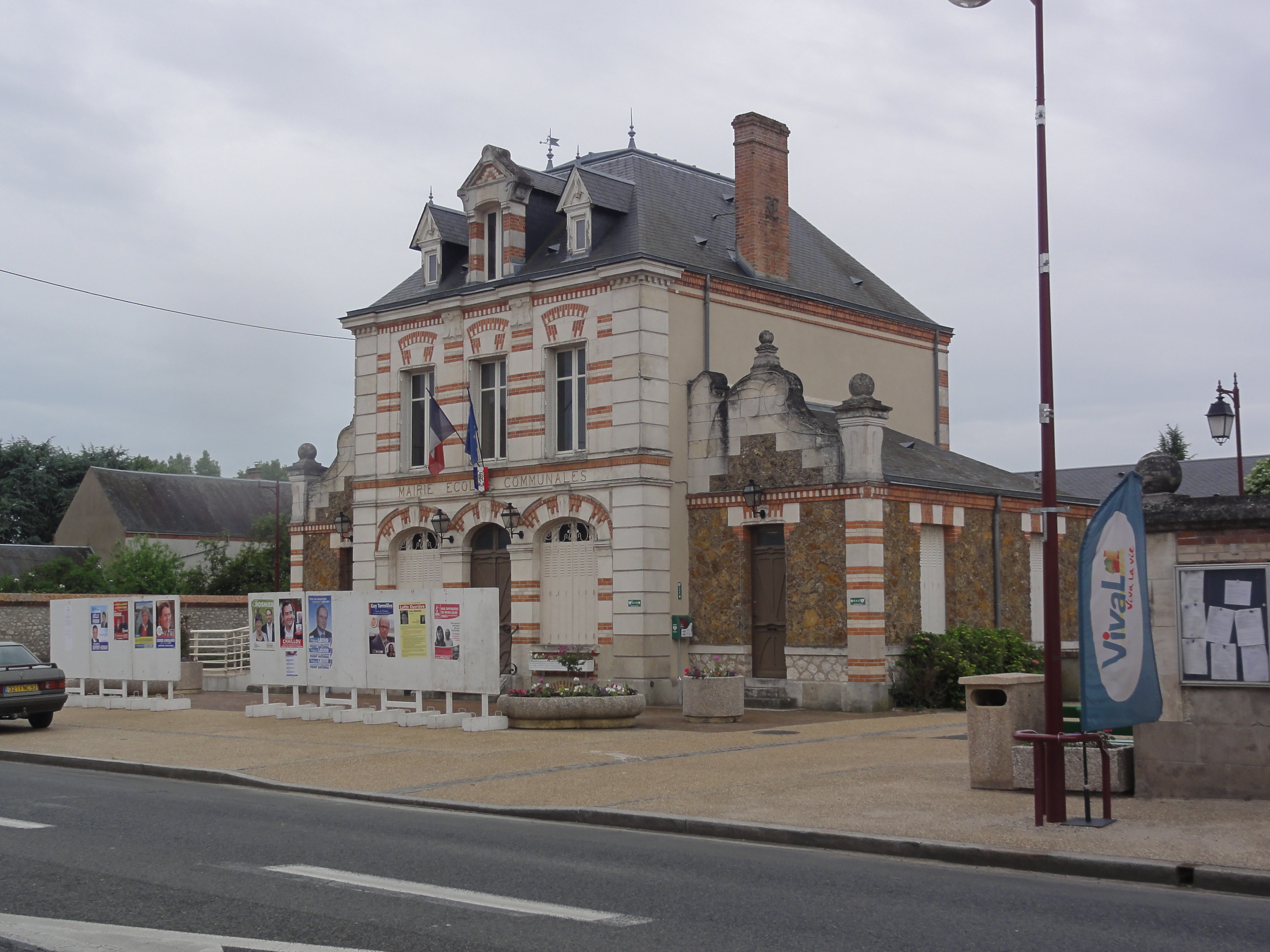
- The town hall and school in Cercottes
- Location of Cercottes
- Location within France Location within Centre-Val de Loire
- Coordinates: 47°59′10″N 1°53′01″E
- Country: France
- Region: Centre-Val de Loire
- Department: Loiret
- Arrondissement: Orléans
- Canton: Meung-sur-Loire

Government
  - Mayor (2020–2026): Martial Savoure-Lejeune
- Area^{1}: 24.24 km^{2} (9.36 sq mi)
- Highest elevation: 133 m (436 ft)
- Lowest elevation: 119 m (390 ft)
- Population (2023): 1,448
  - Density: 59.74/km^{2} (154.7/sq mi)
- Time zone: UTC+01:00 (CET)
  - Summer (DST): UTC+02:00 (CEST)
- INSEE/Postal code: 45062 /45520
- ^{1} French Land Register data, which excludes lakes, ponds, glaciers > 1 km^{2} (0.386 sq mi or 247 acres) and river estuaries.

Cercottes (French pronunciation: [sɛʁkɔt]) is a commune in the Loiret department in north-central France. Cercottes station has rail connections to Orléans, Étampes and Paris.

== See also ==
- Communes of the Loiret department
