= Huisseau-sur-Mauves =

- Commune
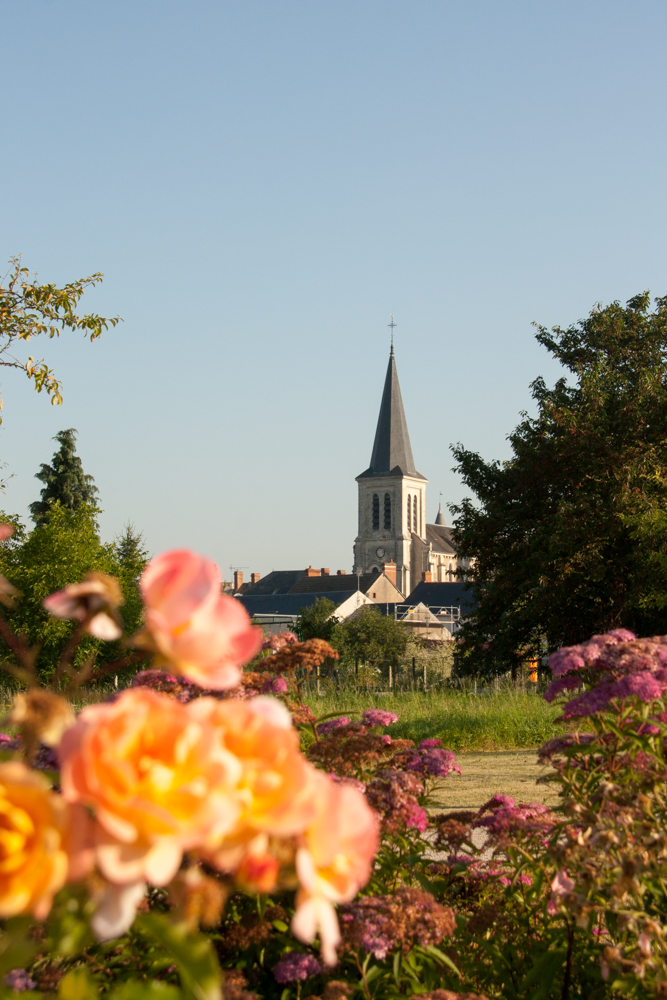
- The church in Huisseau-sur-Mauves
- Location of Huisseau-sur-Mauves
- Location within France Location within Centre-Val de Loire
- Coordinates: 47°53′38″N 1°42′14″E
- Country: France
- Region: Centre-Val de Loire
- Department: Loiret
- Arrondissement: Orléans
- Canton: Meung-sur-Loire

Government
  - Mayor (2020–2026): Jean-Pierre Bothereau
- Area^{1}: 37.16 km^{2} (14.35 sq mi)
- Highest elevation: 121 m (397 ft)
- Lowest elevation: 95 m (312 ft)
- Population (2023): 1,778
  - Density: 47.85/km^{2} (123.9/sq mi)
- Demonym: Uxellois
- Time zone: UTC+01:00 (CET)
  - Summer (DST): UTC+02:00 (CEST)
- INSEE/Postal code: 45167 /45130
- ^{1} French Land Register data, which excludes lakes, ponds, glaciers > 1 km^{2} (0.386 sq mi or 247 acres) and river estuaries.

Huisseau-sur-Mauves (French pronunciation: [ɥiso syʁ mov]) is a commune in the Loiret department in north-central France.

== See also ==
- Communes of the Loiret department
