= Lion-en-Beauce =

- Commune
- Coat of arms
- Location of Lion-en-Beauce
- Location within France Location within Centre-Val de Loire
- Coordinates: 48°08′02″N 1°56′06″E
- Country: France
- Region: Centre-Val de Loire
- Department: Loiret
- Arrondissement: Orléans
- Canton: Meung-sur-Loire

Government
  - Mayor (2020–2026): Damien Moreau
- Area^{1}: 7.00 km^{2} (2.70 sq mi)
- Highest elevation: 137 m (449 ft)
- Lowest elevation: 121 m (397 ft)
- Population (2023): 120
  - Density: 17/km^{2} (44/sq mi)
- Demonym: Lionnais
- Time zone: UTC+01:00 (CET)
  - Summer (DST): UTC+02:00 (CEST)
- INSEE/Postal code: 45183 /45410
- ^{1} French Land Register data, which excludes lakes, ponds, glaciers > 1 km^{2} (0.386 sq mi or 247 acres) and river estuaries.

Lion-en-Beauce (French pronunciation: [ljɔ̃ ɑ̃ bos], lit. 'Lion in Beauce') is a commune in the Loiret department in north-central France.

== See also ==
- Communes of the Loiret department
