= Sandillon =

- Commune
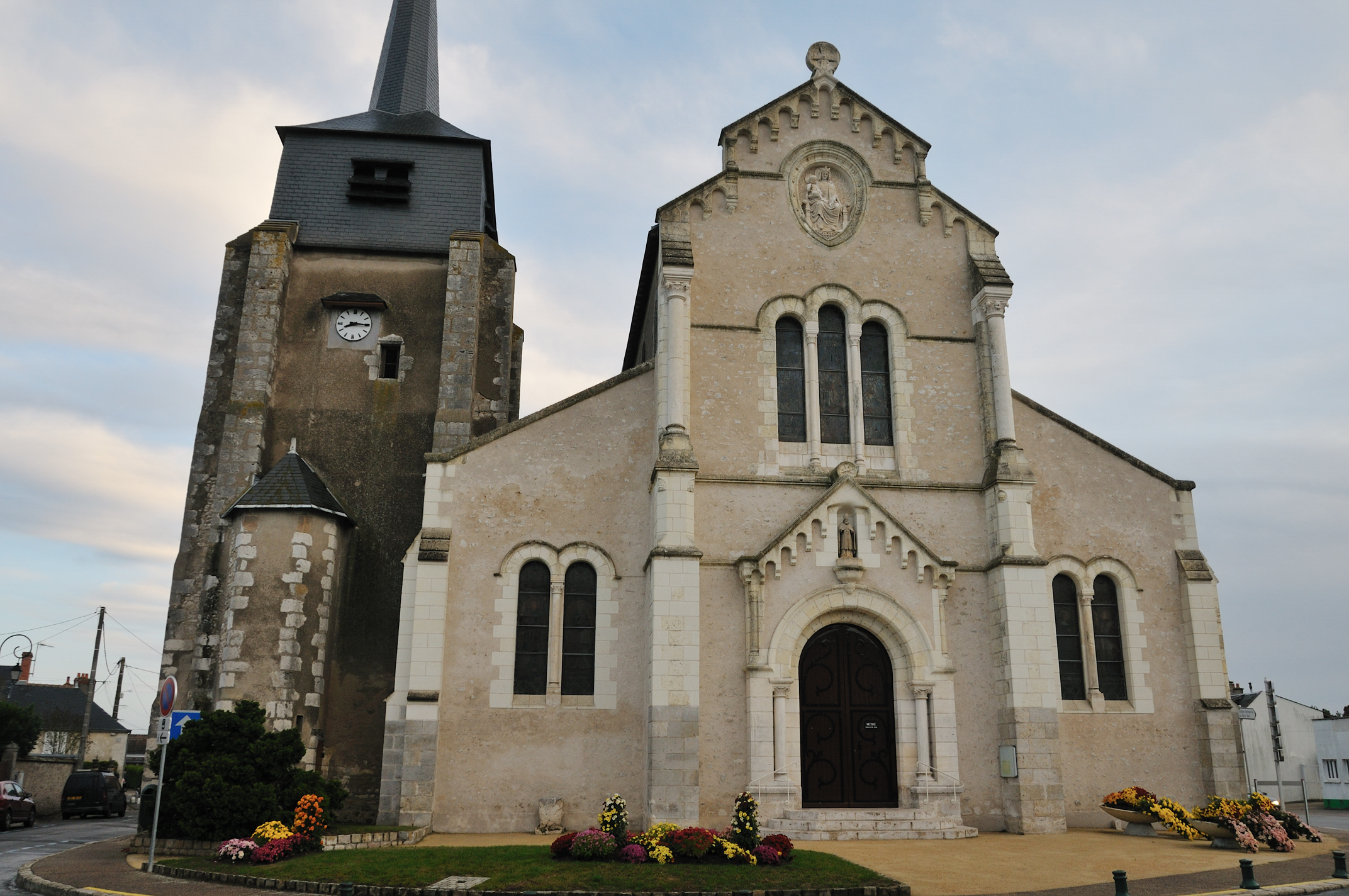
- The church in Sandillon

- Coat of arms
- Location of Sandillon
- Location within France Location within Centre-Val de Loire
- Coordinates: 47°50′46″N 2°02′00″E
- Country: France
- Region: Centre-Val de Loire
- Department: Loiret
- Arrondissement: Orléans
- Canton: Saint-Jean-le-Blanc
- Intercommunality: Loges

Government
  - Mayor (2020–2026): Pascal Juteau
- Area^{1}: 41.31 km^{2} (15.95 sq mi)
- Highest elevation: 121 m (397 ft)
- Lowest elevation: 95 m (312 ft)
- Population (2023): 4,300
  - Density: 100/km^{2} (270/sq mi)
- Demonym: Sandillonnais
- Time zone: UTC+01:00 (CET)
  - Summer (DST): UTC+02:00 (CEST)
- INSEE/Postal code: 45300 /45640
- Website: www.sandillon.fr
- ^{1} French Land Register data, which excludes lakes, ponds, glaciers > 1 km^{2} (0.386 sq mi or 247 acres) and river estuaries.

Sandillon (French pronunciation: [sɑ̃dijɔ̃]) is a commune in the Loiret department in north-central France.

== Population ==
Historical population
Year	Pop.	±% p.a.
1968	1,440	—
1975	1,744	+2.77%
1982	2,562	+5.65%
1990	3,000	+1.99%
1999	3,405	+1.42%
2007	3,675	+0.96%
2012	3,971	+1.56%
2017	3,971	+0.00%
2023	4,300	+1.34%
Source: INSEE

== See also ==
- Communes of the Loiret department
