= Saint-Jean-le-Blanc, Loiret =

Saint-Jean-le-Blanc
- Commune
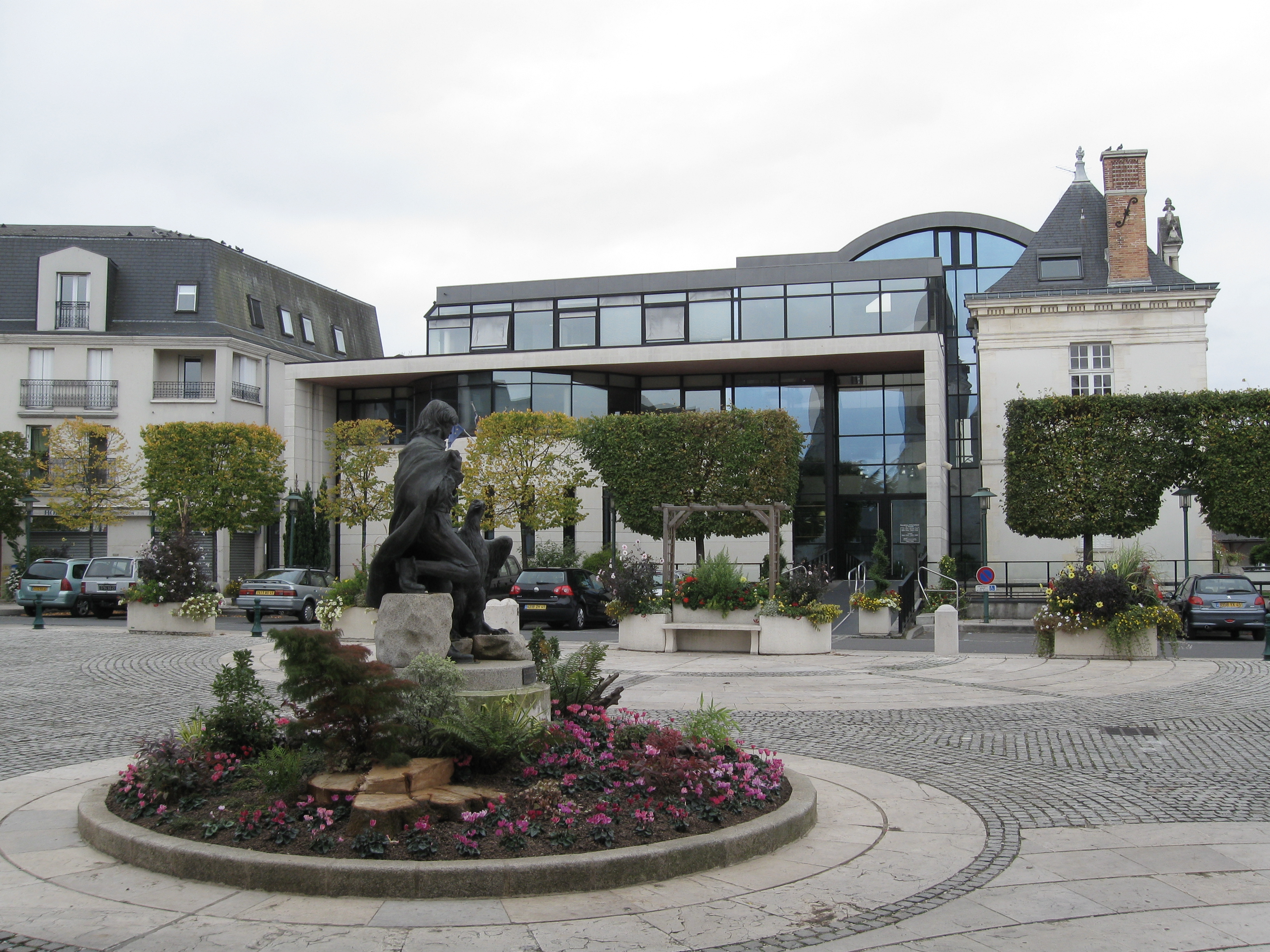
- Town hall

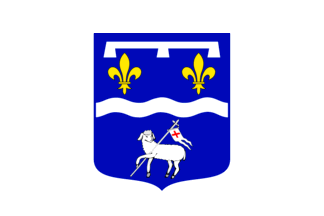
- Flag Coat of arms
- Location of Saint-Jean-le-Blanc
- Location within France Location within Centre-Val de Loire
- Coordinates: 47°53′34″N 1°55′06″E
- Country: France
- Region: Centre-Val de Loire
- Department: Loiret
- Arrondissement: Orléans
- Canton: Saint-Jean-le-Blanc
- Intercommunality: Orléans Métropole

Government
  - Mayor (2023–2026): Thierry Charpentier
- Area^{1}: 7.66 km^{2} (2.96 sq mi)
- Highest elevation: 100 m (330 ft)
- Lowest elevation: 91 m (299 ft)
- Population (2023): 9,562
  - Density: 1,250/km^{2} (3,230/sq mi)
- Time zone: UTC+01:00 (CET)
  - Summer (DST): UTC+02:00 (CEST)
- INSEE/Postal code: 45286 /45650
- ^{1} French Land Register data, which excludes lakes, ponds, glaciers > 1 km^{2} (0.386 sq mi or 247 acres) and river estuaries.

Saint-Jean-le-Blanc (French pronunciation: [sɛ̃ ʒɑ̃ lə blɑ̃]) is a commune in the Loiret department in north-central France.

== Population ==
Historical population
Year	Pop.	±% p.a.
1968	4,731	—
1975	6,531	+4.71%
1982	6,549	+0.04%
1990	6,806	+0.48%
1999	8,493	+2.49%
2007	8,318	−0.26%
2012	8,099	−0.53%
2017	8,702	+1.45%
2023	9,562	+1.58%
Source: INSEE

== See also ==
- Communes of the Loiret department
