= Ruan, Loiret =

Ruan
- Commune
- Location of Ruan
- Location within France Location within Centre-Val de Loire
- Coordinates: 48°06′45″N 1°56′24″E
- Country: France
- Region: Centre-Val de Loire
- Department: Loiret
- Arrondissement: Orléans
- Canton: Meung-sur-Loire

Government
  - Mayor (2020–2026): Anne-Elodie Legrand
- Area^{1}: 16.26 km^{2} (6.28 sq mi)
- Highest elevation: 132 m (433 ft)
- Lowest elevation: 119 m (390 ft)
- Population (2023): 200
  - Density: 12/km^{2} (32/sq mi)
- Demonym: Ruanais
- Time zone: UTC+01:00 (CET)
  - Summer (DST): UTC+02:00 (CEST)
- INSEE/Postal code: 45266 /45410
- ^{1} French Land Register data, which excludes lakes, ponds, glaciers > 1 km^{2} (0.386 sq mi or 247 acres) and river estuaries.

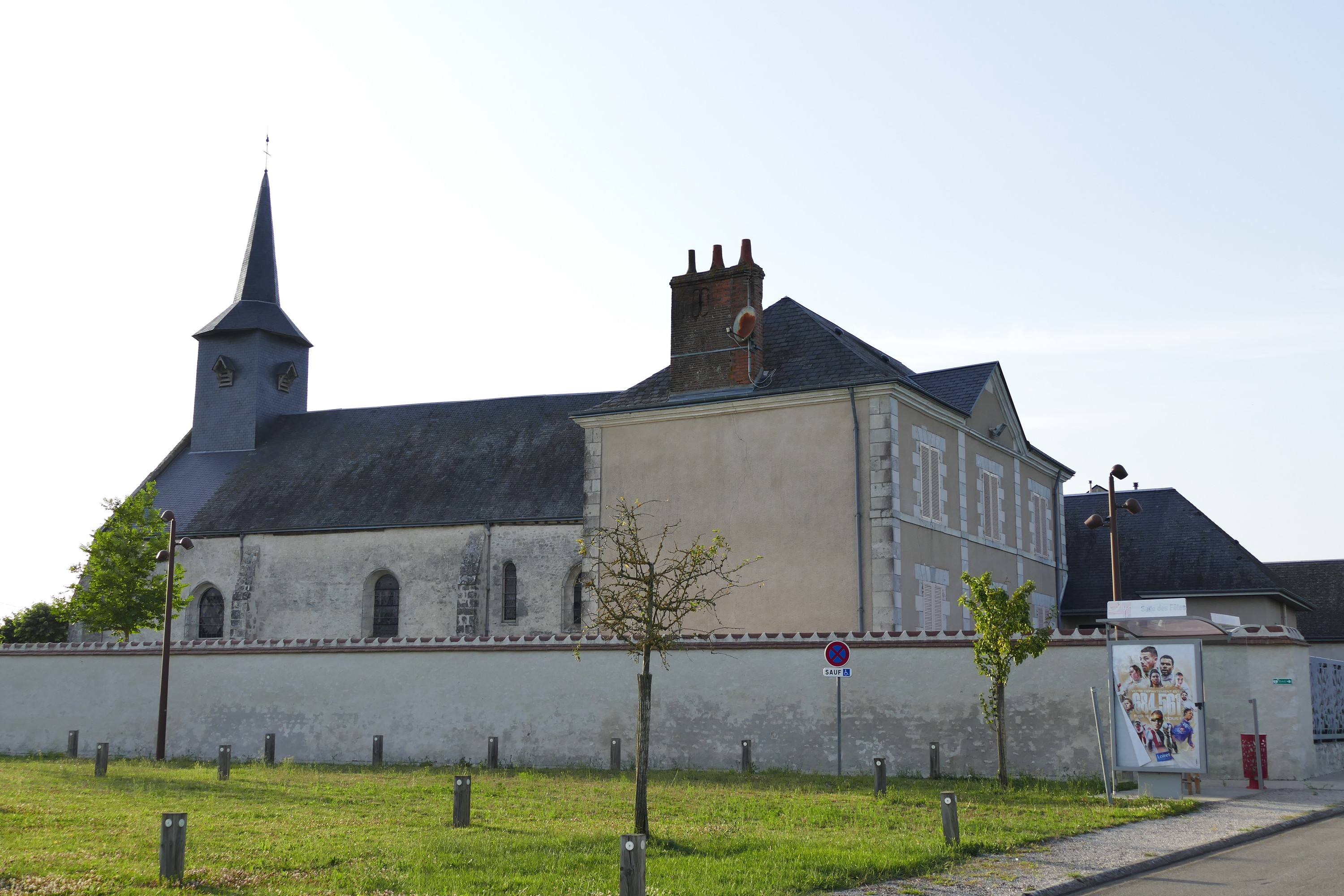
Ruan - Saint-Ythier-et-Saint-Sébastien Church

Ruan (French pronunciation: [ʁɥɑ̃]) is a commune in the Loiret department in north-central France.

== See also ==
- Communes of the Loiret department
