= La Chapelle-Onzerain =

- Commune
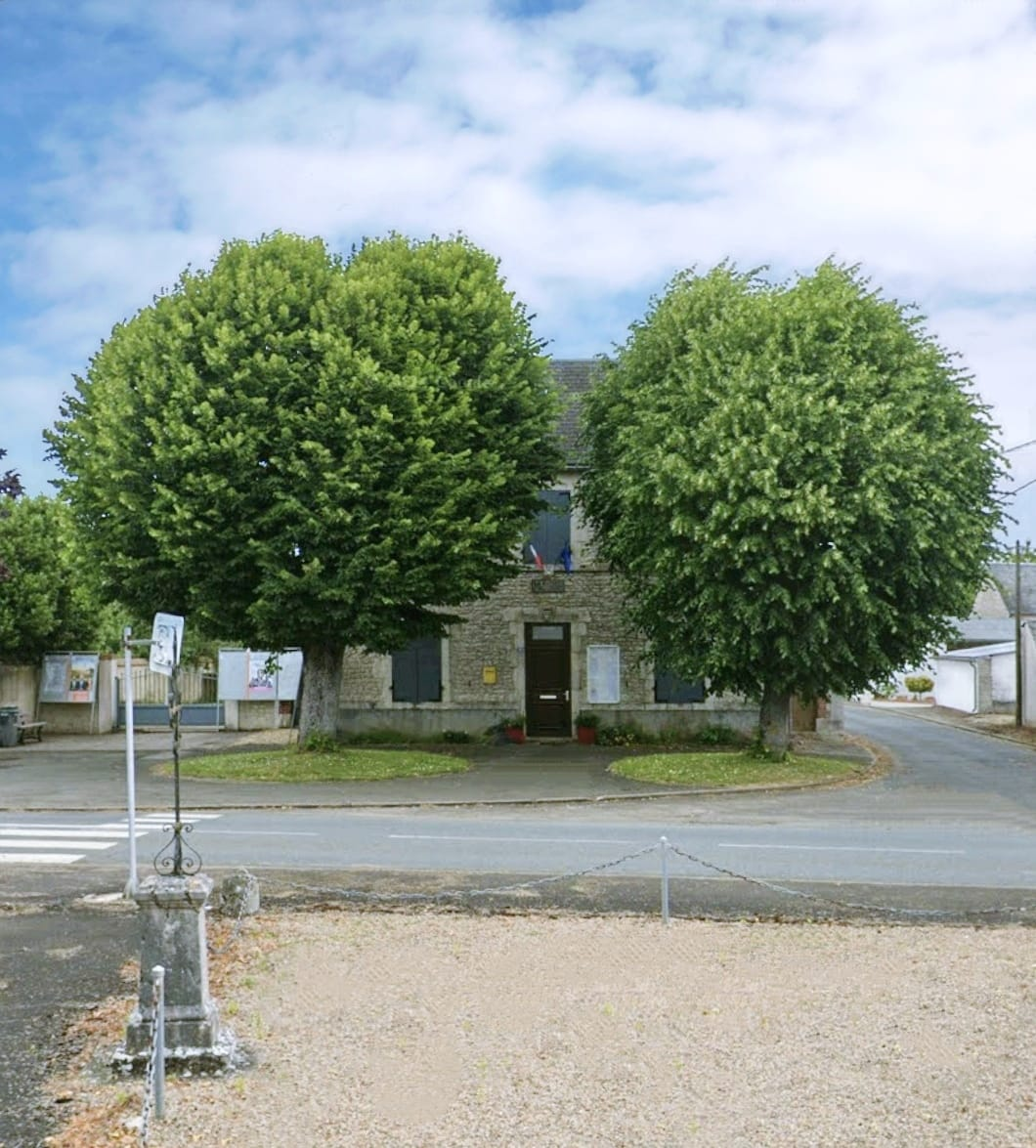
- La Chapelle-Onzerain Town hall
- Location of La Chapelle-Onzerain
- Location within France Location within Centre-Val de Loire
- Coordinates: 48°02′03″N 1°36′46″E
- Country: France
- Region: Centre-Val de Loire
- Department: Loiret
- Arrondissement: Orléans
- Canton: Meung-sur-Loire

Government
  - Mayor (2020–2026): Aline Chassine Tourne
- Area^{1}: 7.06 km^{2} (2.73 sq mi)
- Highest elevation: 134 m (440 ft)
- Lowest elevation: 120 m (390 ft)
- Population (2023): 110
  - Density: 16/km^{2} (40/sq mi)
- Demonym: Chapellois
- Time zone: UTC+01:00 (CET)
  - Summer (DST): UTC+02:00 (CEST)
- INSEE/Postal code: 45074 /45310
- ^{1} French Land Register data, which excludes lakes, ponds, glaciers > 1 km^{2} (0.386 sq mi or 247 acres) and river estuaries.

La Chapelle-Onzerain (French pronunciation: [la ʃapɛl ɔ̃zʁɛ̃]) is a commune in the Loiret department in north-central France.

== See also ==
- Communes of the Loiret department
