= Villamblain =

Commune in France

- Commune
- Location of Villamblain
- Location within France Location within Centre-Val de Loire
- Coordinates: 48°00′39″N 1°33′10″E
- Country: France
- Region: Centre-Val de Loire
- Department: Loiret
- Arrondissement: Orléans
- Canton: Meung-sur-Loire

Government
  - Mayor (2020–2026): Thierry Claveau
- Area^{1}: 25.95 km^{2} (10.02 sq mi)
- Highest elevation: 135 m (443 ft)
- Lowest elevation: 119 m (390 ft)
- Population (2023): 278
  - Density: 10.7/km^{2} (27.7/sq mi)
- Time zone: UTC+01:00 (CET)
  - Summer (DST): UTC+02:00 (CEST)
- INSEE/Postal code: 45337 /45310
- ^{1} French Land Register data, which excludes lakes, ponds, glaciers > 1 km^{2} (0.386 sq mi or 247 acres) and river estuaries.

Villamblain (French pronunciation: [vilɑ̃blɛ̃]) is a commune in the Loiret department in north-central France.

== See also ==
- Communes of the Loiret department
