= Gidy =

- Commune
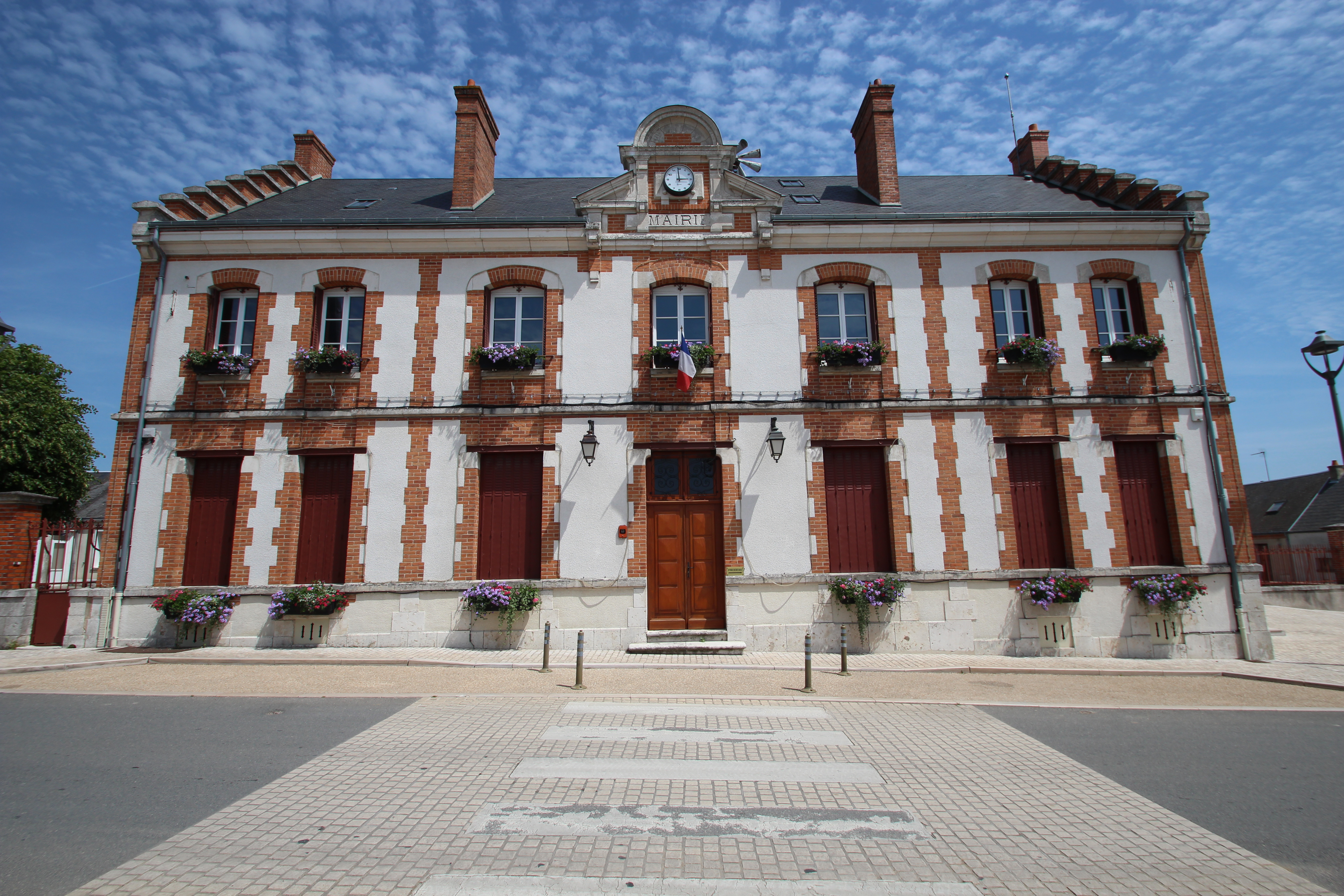
- The town hall in Gidy

- Coat of arms
- Location of Gidy
- Location within France Location within Centre-Val de Loire
- Coordinates: 47°59′22″N 1°50′08″E
- Country: France
- Region: Centre-Val de Loire
- Department: Loiret
- Arrondissement: Orléans
- Canton: Meung-sur-Loire

Government
  - Mayor (2020–2026): Benoît Perdereau
- Area^{1}: 23.91 km^{2} (9.23 sq mi)
- Highest elevation: 128 m (420 ft)
- Lowest elevation: 117 m (384 ft)
- Population (2023): 2,084
  - Density: 87.16/km^{2} (225.7/sq mi)
- Demonym: Gidéens
- Time zone: UTC+01:00 (CET)
  - Summer (DST): UTC+02:00 (CEST)
- INSEE/Postal code: 45154 /45520
- Website: www.gidy.fr
- ^{1} French Land Register data, which excludes lakes, ponds, glaciers > 1 km^{2} (0.386 sq mi or 247 acres) and river estuaries.

Gidy (French pronunciation: [ʒidi]) is a commune in the Loiret department in north-central France.

== Population ==
Historical population
Year	Pop.	±% p.a.
1968	736	—
1975	1,037	+5.02%
1982	1,252	+2.73%
1990	1,450	+1.85%
1999	1,482	+0.24%
2007	1,497	+0.13%
2012	1,647	+1.93%
2017	2,009	+4.05%
2023	2,084	+0.61%
Source: INSEE

== See also ==
- Communes of the Loiret department
