= Sougy =

- Commune
- Location of Sougy
- Location within France Location within Centre-Val de Loire
- Coordinates: 48°03′16″N 1°47′26″E
- Country: France
- Region: Centre-Val de Loire
- Department: Loiret
- Arrondissement: Orléans
- Canton: Meung-sur-Loire

Government
  - Mayor (2020–2026): Eric David
- Area^{1}: 28.25 km^{2} (10.91 sq mi)
- Highest elevation: 134 m (440 ft)
- Lowest elevation: 121 m (397 ft)
- Population (2023): 853
  - Density: 30.2/km^{2} (78.2/sq mi)
- Time zone: UTC+01:00 (CET)
  - Summer (DST): UTC+02:00 (CEST)
- INSEE/Postal code: 45313 /45410
- ^{1} French Land Register data, which excludes lakes, ponds, glaciers > 1 km^{2} (0.386 sq mi or 247 acres) and river estuaries.

Sougy (French pronunciation: [suʒi]) is a commune in the Loiret department in north-central France.

== See also ==
- Communes of the Loiret department
