= Épieds-en-Beauce =

- Commune
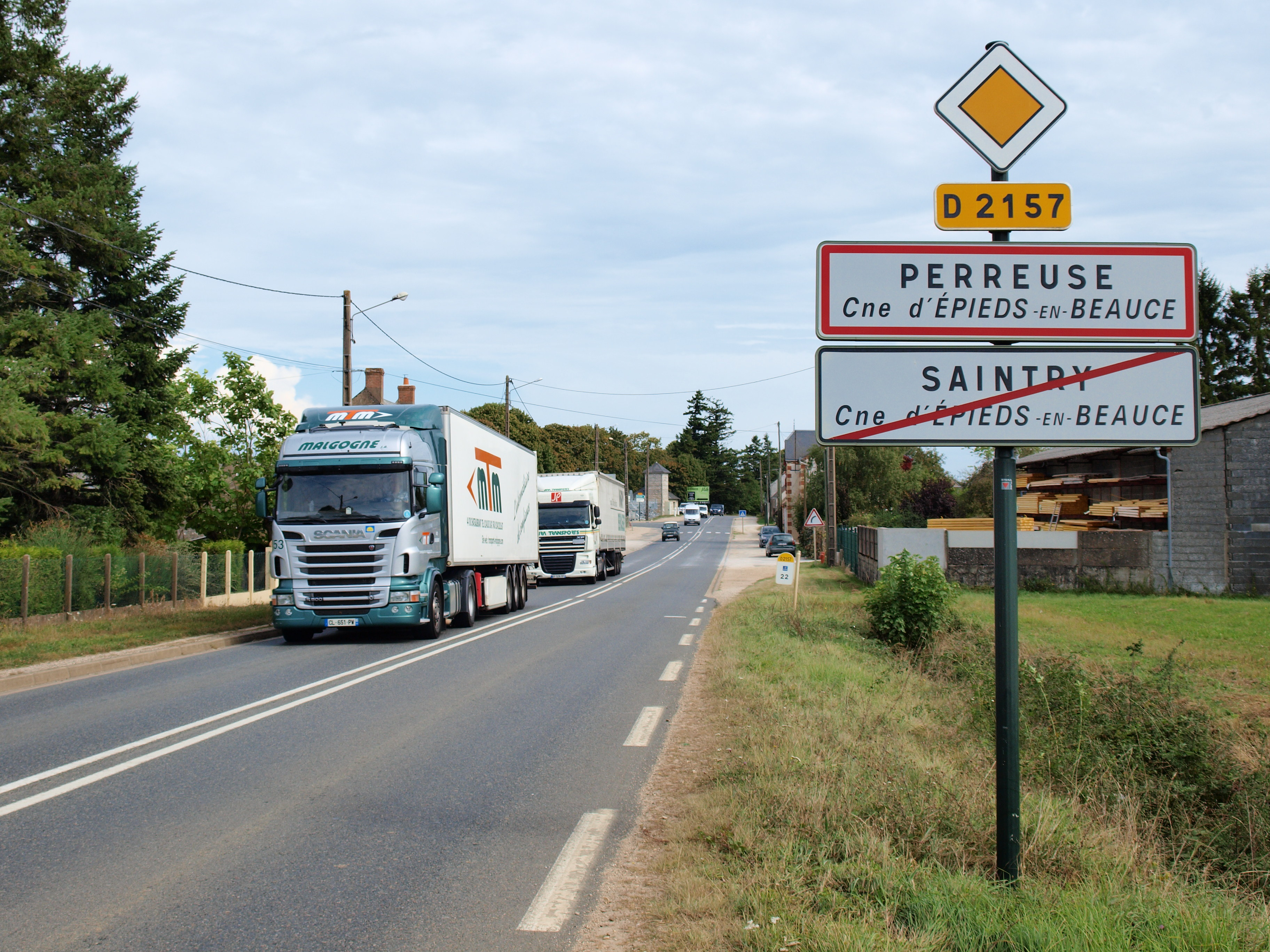
- The D2127 in Épieds-en-Beauce
- Location of Épieds-en-Beauce
- Location within France Location within Centre-Val de Loire
- Coordinates: 47°57′03″N 1°37′07″E
- Country: France
- Region: Centre-Val de Loire
- Department: Loiret
- Arrondissement: Orléans
- Canton: Meung-sur-Loire

Government
  - Mayor (2020–2026): Yves Faucheux
- Area^{1}: 40.22 km^{2} (15.53 sq mi)
- Highest elevation: 129 m (423 ft)
- Lowest elevation: 114 m (374 ft)
- Population (2023): 1,459
  - Density: 36.28/km^{2} (93.95/sq mi)
- Demonym: Spicaciens
- Time zone: UTC+01:00 (CET)
  - Summer (DST): UTC+02:00 (CEST)
- INSEE/Postal code: 45134 /45130
- ^{1} French Land Register data, which excludes lakes, ponds, glaciers > 1 km^{2} (0.386 sq mi or 247 acres) and river estuaries.

Épieds-en-Beauce (French pronunciation: [epje ɑ̃ bos], literally Épieds in Beauce) is a commune in the Loiret department in the agricultural region of Beauce. The area the commune is located in has been occupied since Neolithic times.

== See also ==
- Communes of the Loiret department
