= Bucy-le-Roi =

- Commune
- Coat of arms
- Location of Bucy-le-Roi
- Location within France Location within Centre-Val de Loire
- Coordinates: 48°03′40″N 1°55′05″E
- Country: France
- Region: Centre-Val de Loire
- Department: Loiret
- Arrondissement: Orléans
- Canton: Meung-sur-Loire

Government
  - Mayor (2020–2026): Gervais Greffin
- Area^{1}: 4.58 km^{2} (1.77 sq mi)
- Highest elevation: 128 m (420 ft)
- Lowest elevation: 121 m (397 ft)
- Population (2023): 177
  - Density: 38.6/km^{2} (100/sq mi)
- Time zone: UTC+01:00 (CET)
  - Summer (DST): UTC+02:00 (CEST)
- INSEE/Postal code: 45058 /45410
- ^{1} French Land Register data, which excludes lakes, ponds, glaciers > 1 km^{2} (0.386 sq mi or 247 acres) and river estuaries.

Bucy-le-Roi (French pronunciation: [bysi lə ʁwa]) is a commune in the Loiret department in north-central France.

== Population ==
Historical population
Year	Pop.	±% p.a.
1968	137	—
1975	136	−0.10%
1982	127	−0.97%
1990	156	+2.60%
1999	177	+1.41%
2007	189	+0.82%
2012	187	−0.21%
2017	171	−1.77%
2023	177	+0.58%
Source: INSEE

== See also ==
- Communes of the Loiret department
