= Bucy-Saint-Liphard =

- Commune
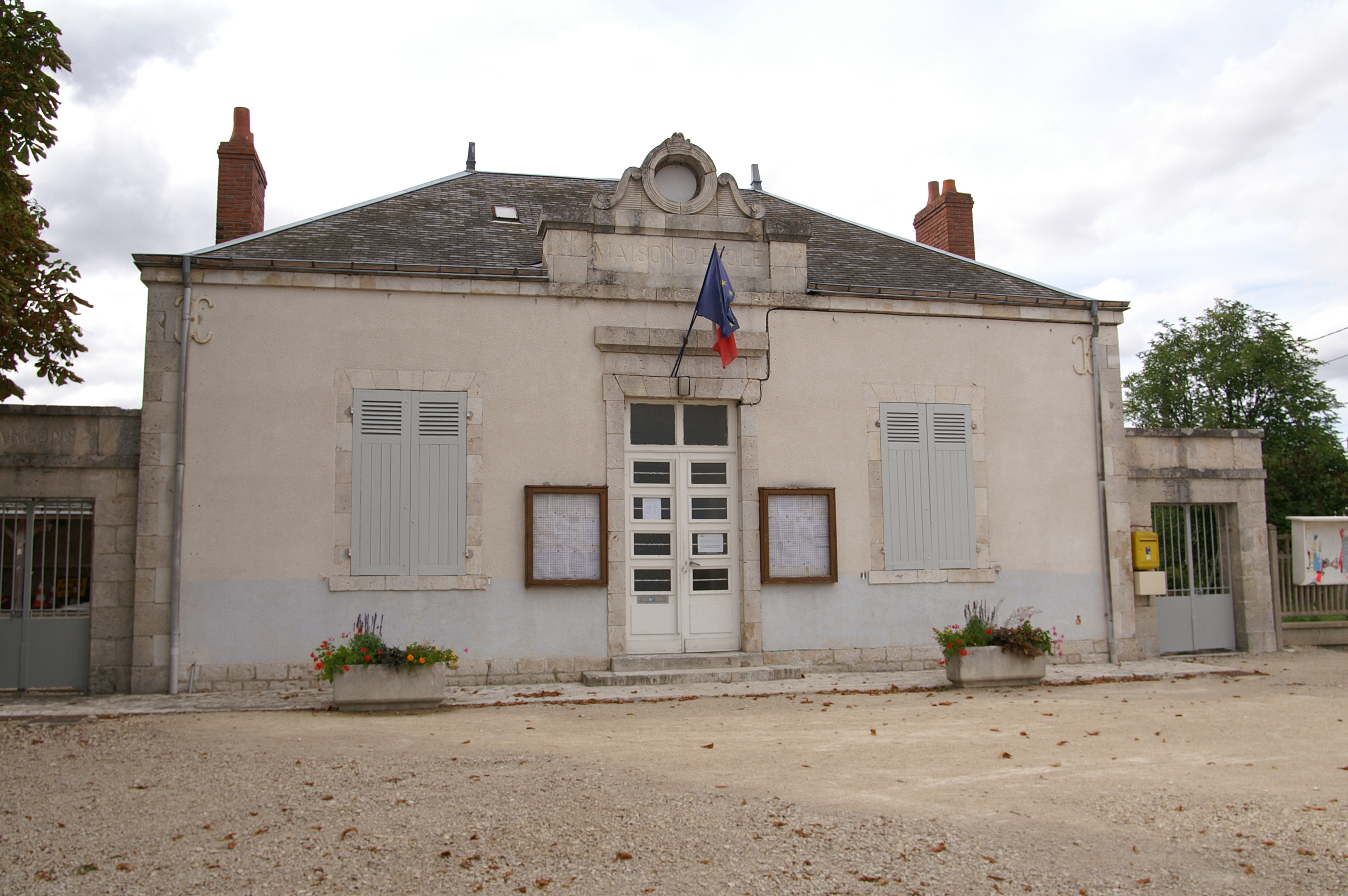
- The town hall in Bucy-Saint-Liphard

- Coat of arms
- Location of Bucy-Saint-Liphard
- Location within France Location within Centre-Val de Loire
- Coordinates: 47°56′12″N 1°45′57″E
- Country: France
- Region: Centre-Val de Loire
- Department: Loiret
- Arrondissement: Orléans
- Canton: Meung-sur-Loire

Government
  - Mayor (2024–2026): Denis Reig
- Area^{1}: 17.84 km^{2} (6.89 sq mi)
- Highest elevation: 131 m (430 ft)
- Lowest elevation: 105 m (344 ft)
- Population (2023): 215
  - Density: 12.1/km^{2} (31.2/sq mi)
- Time zone: UTC+01:00 (CET)
  - Summer (DST): UTC+02:00 (CEST)
- INSEE/Postal code: 45059 /45140
- ^{1} French Land Register data, which excludes lakes, ponds, glaciers > 1 km^{2} (0.386 sq mi or 247 acres) and river estuaries.

Bucy-Saint-Liphard (French pronunciation: [bysi sɛ̃ lifaʁ]) is a commune in the Loiret department in north-central France.

== Population ==
Historical population
| Year | Pop. | ±% p.a. |
|---|---|---|
| 1968 | 170 | — |
| 1975 | 245 | +5.36% |
| 1982 | 231 | −0.84% |
| 1990 | 227 | −0.22% |
| 1999 | 217 | −0.50% |
| 2007 | 209 | −0.47% |
| 2012 | 201 | −0.78% |
| 2017 | 191 | −1.02% |
| 2023 | 215 | +1.99% |
Source: INSEE

== See also ==
- Communes of the Loiret department
