= Canton of Meung-sur-Loire =

Coordinates: 47.83°N 1.69°E

The canton of Meung-sur-Loire is an administrative division of the Loiret department, central France. Its borders were modified at the French canton reorganisation which came into effect in March 2015. Its seat is in Meung-sur-Loire.

It consists of the following communes:

1. Artenay
2. Le Bardon
3. Boulay-les-Barres
4. Bricy
5. Bucy-le-Roi
6. Bucy-Saint-Liphard
7. Cercottes
8. Chaingy
9. La Chapelle-Onzerain
10. Charsonville
11. Chevilly
12. Coinces
13. Coulmiers
14. Épieds-en-Beauce
15. Gémigny
16. Gidy
17. Huêtre
18. Huisseau-sur-Mauves
19. Lion-en-Beauce
20. Meung-sur-Loire
21. Patay
22. Rouvray-Sainte-Croix
23. Rozières-en-Beauce
24. Ruan
25. Saint-Ay
26. Saint-Péravy-la-Colombe
27. Saint-Sigismond
28. Sougy
29. Tournoisis
30. Trinay
31. Villamblain
32. Villeneuve-sur-Conie
