= Bucy-lès-Pierrepont =

- Commune
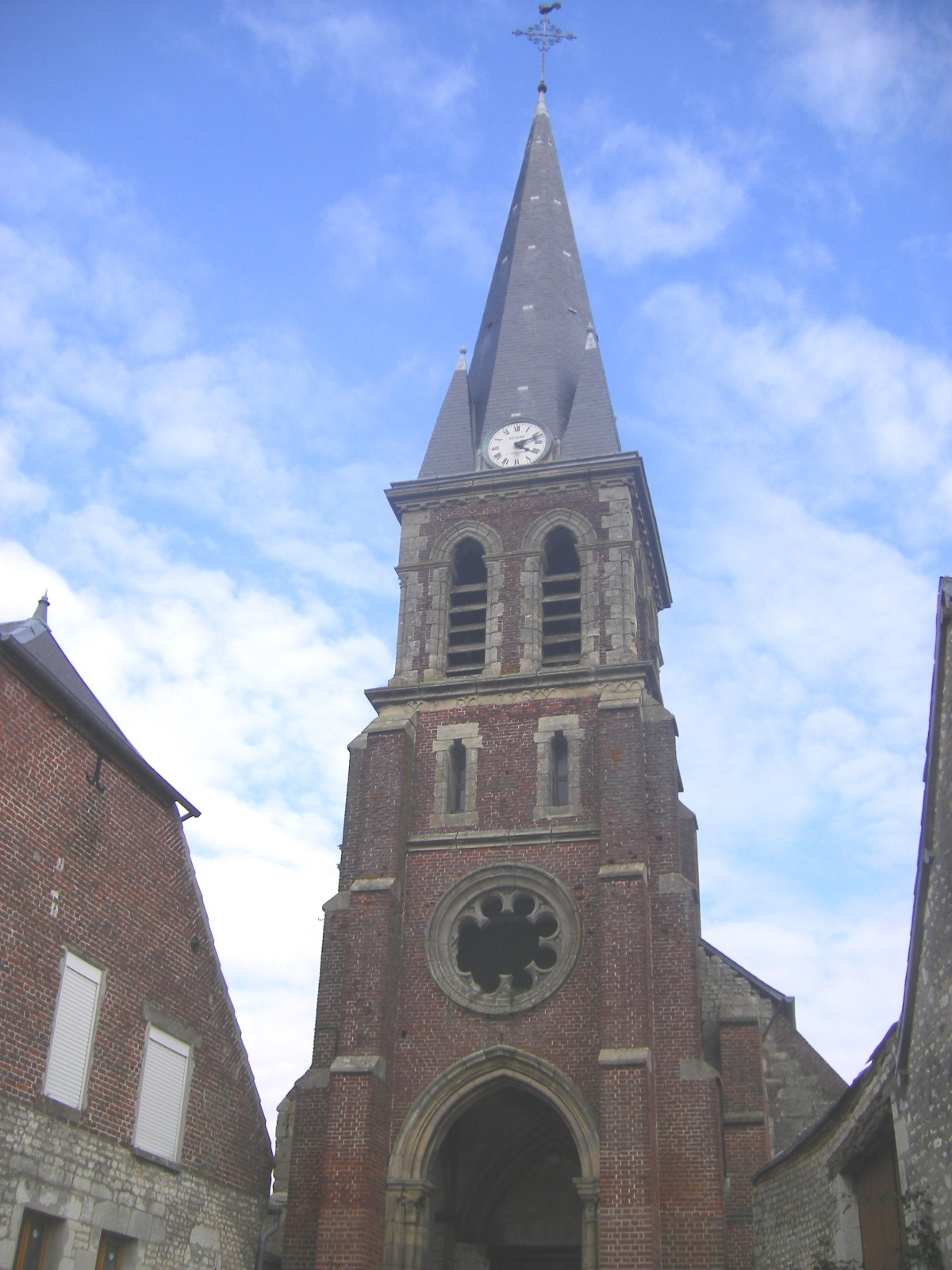
- The church of Bucy-lès-Pierrepont
- Location of Bucy-lès-Pierrepont
- Location within France Location within Hauts-de-France
- Coordinates: 49°38′51″N 3°54′12″E
- Country: France
- Region: Hauts-de-France
- Department: Aisne
- Arrondissement: Laon
- Canton: Villeneuve-sur-Aisne
- Intercommunality: Champagne Picarde

Government
  - Mayor (2026–32): Béatrice Coulbeaut
- Area^{1}: 14.46 km^{2} (5.58 sq mi)
- Elevation: 106 m (348 ft)
- Highest elevation: 136 m (446 ft)
- Lowest elevation: 75 m (246 ft)
- Population (2023): 410
  - Density: 28/km^{2} (73/sq mi)
- Time zone: UTC+01:00 (CET)
  - Summer (DST): UTC+02:00 (CEST)
- INSEE/Postal code: 02133 /02350
- ^{1} French Land Register data, which excludes lakes, ponds, glaciers > 1 km^{2} (0.386 sq mi or 247 acres) and river estuaries.

Bucy-lès-Pierrepont (French pronunciation: [bysi lɛ pjɛʁpɔ̃], literally Bucy near Pierrepont) is a commune in the department of Aisne in Hauts-de-France in northern France.

== Population ==
Historical population
Year	Pop.	±% p.a.
1968	607	—
1975	521	−2.16%
1982	457	−1.85%
1990	432	−0.70%
1999	418	−0.37%
2007	420	+0.06%
2012	421	+0.05%
2017	411	−0.48%
2023	410	−0.04%
Source: INSEE

== See also ==
- Communes of the Aisne department
