= La Belle Otero =

Spanish dancer, actress and courtesan in France

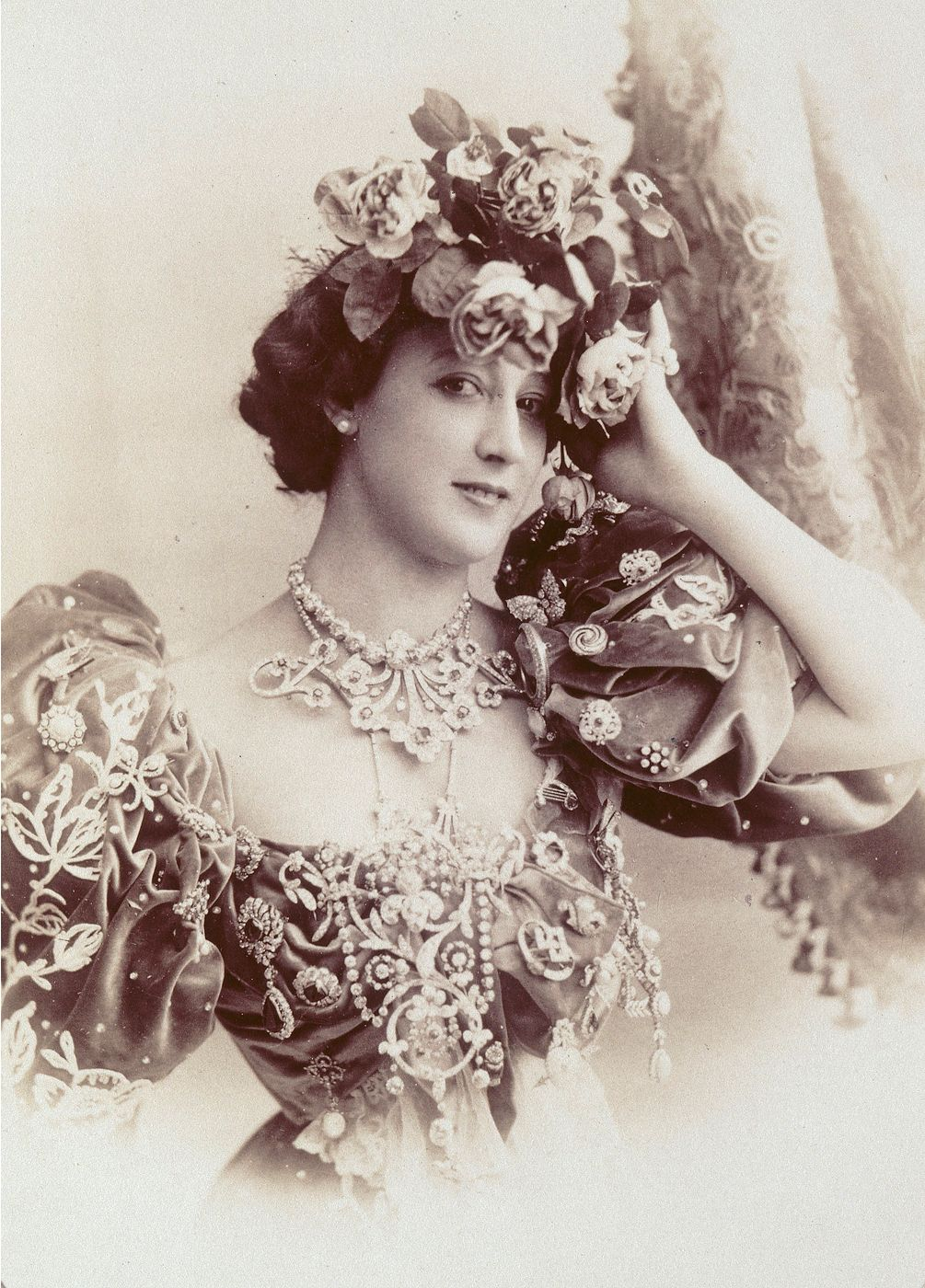
- La Belle Otero by Léopold-Émile Reutlinger
- Born: Agustina del Carmen Otero Iglesias; 4 November 1868; Valga, Galicia, Spain
- Died: 10 April 1965 (aged 96); Nice, France
- Occupations: Dancer, actress, courtesan

Agustina del Carmen Otero Iglesias (4 November 1868 – 10 April 1965), better known as Carolina Otero or La Belle Otero, was a Spanish actress, dancer and courtesan. She had a reputation for great beauty and was famous for her numerous lovers.

== Biography ==
=== Early years ===
Agustina del Carmen Otero Iglesias was born in Valga Galicia, Spain, daughter of a Spanish single mother, Carmen Otero Iglesias (1844–1903), and a Greek army officer named Carasson. Her family was impoverished, and as a child she moved to Santiago de Compostela working as a maid. At age 10, she was raped, and at 14, she left home with her boyfriend and dancing partner Paco and began working as a singer/dancer in Lisbon.

=== Career as artiste and courtesan ===
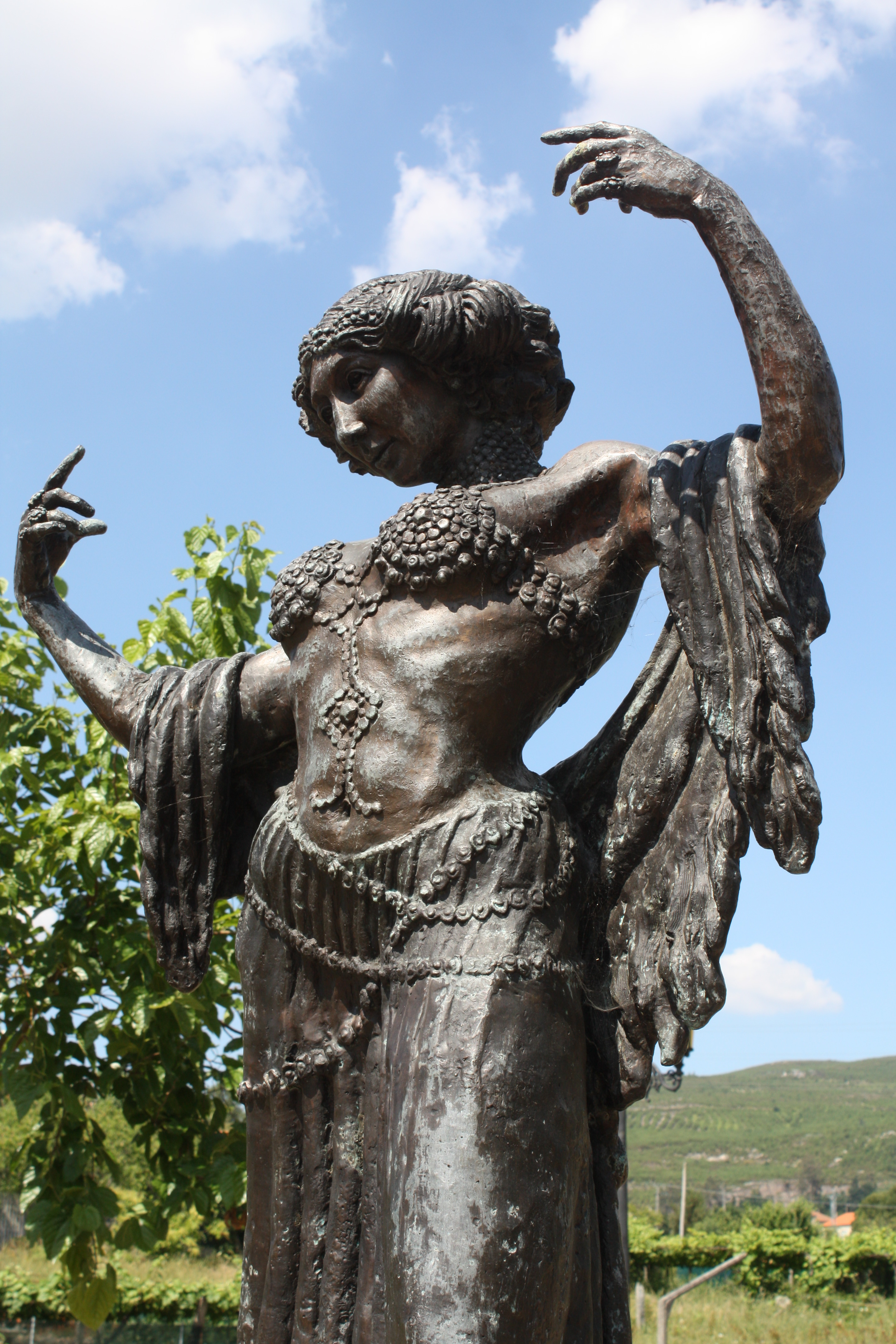
Statue of La Belle Otero by Camilo Rodríguez Vidal, in Valga, Spain

In 1888, Otero found a sponsor named Ernest Jurgens in Barcelona who moved with her to Marseilles to promote her dancing career in France. She soon left him and created the character of La Belle Otero, portraying herself as an Andalusian Romani woman. She was pretty, confident, intelligent, with an attractive figure. It was said that her extraordinarily dark black eyes were so captivating that they were "of such intensity that it was impossible not to be detained before them". She wound up as the star of Folies Bèrgere productions in Paris. In 1892 she along with Prince Albert of Monaco and Nicholas I of Montenegro lived in the same apartment together. One of her more famous costumes featured her voluptuous bosom partially covered with glued-on precious gems, and the twin cupolas of the Carlton Hotel built in 1912 in Cannes are popularly said to have been modeled upon her breasts.

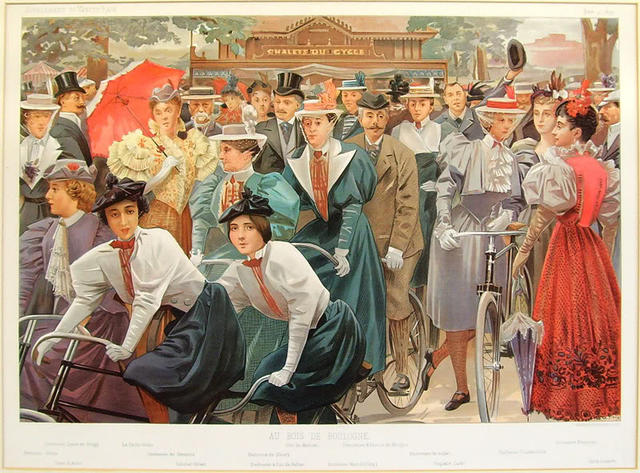
Otero appears with Liane de Pougy and Cléo de Merode in a fashionable crowd in the Bois de Boulogne drawn by Guth, 1897

Within a short number of years, Otero was said to be the most sought-after woman in Europe. She was serving, by this time, as a courtesan to wealthy and powerful men of the day, and she chose her lovers carefully. She associated herself with Kaiser Wilhelm II, Prince Albert I of Monaco, Prince Nicholas I of Montenegro, King Edward VII, Peter I of Serbia, and King Alfonso XIII of Spain, as well as Russian Grand Dukes Peter and Nicholas, the Duke of Westminster and writer Gabriele D'Annunzio. Her love affairs made her notorious, and the envy of many other notable female personalities of the day. Six men reportedly committed suicide after their love affairs with Otero ended, but this has never been substantiated beyond a doubt. It is a fact, however, that two men did fight a duel over her.

=== Early film ===
In August 1898, in St-Petersburg, the French film operator Félix Mesguich (an employee of the Lumière company) shot a one-minute reel of Otero performing the famous "Valse Brillante." The screening of the film at the Aquarium music-hall provoked such a scandal (because an officer of the Tsar's army appeared in this frivolous scene) that Mesguich was expelled from Russia.

=== Later life ===
Otero retired after World War I, purchasing a mansion and property at a cost of the equivalent of US$15 million. She had accumulated a massive fortune over the years, about US$25 million, but she gambled much of it away over the remainder of her lifetime, enjoying a lavish lifestyle, and visiting the casinos of Monte Carlo often. She lived out her life in a pronounced state of poverty until she died of a heart attack in 1965 in her one-room apartment at the Hotel Novelty in Nice, France.

Of her heyday and career, Otero once said "Women have one mission in life: to be beautiful. When one gets old, one must learn how to break mirrors. I am very gently expecting to die."

== Notable published works ==
- Les Souvenirs et la Vie Intime de la Belle Otero (1926). ISBN 9782402042819

A Jose Martí poem "El alma trémula y sola" was inspired and dedicated to Carolina Otero

== In film and literature ==
- A 1954 film La Belle Otero starring Mexican actress María Félix.
- A portrait of "Madame Otero" in Colette's My Apprenticeships.

== Gallery ==
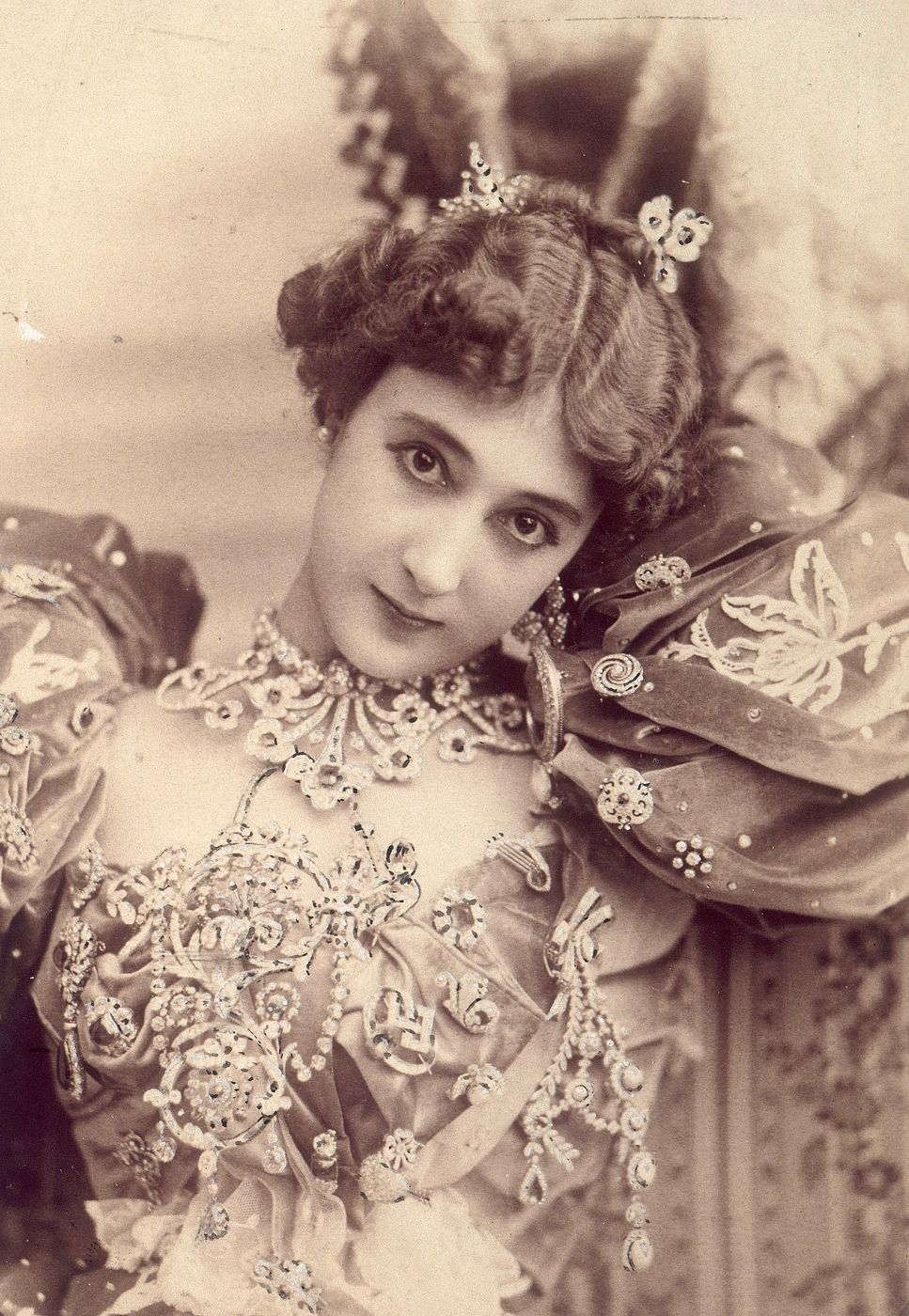
La Belle Otero circa 1890

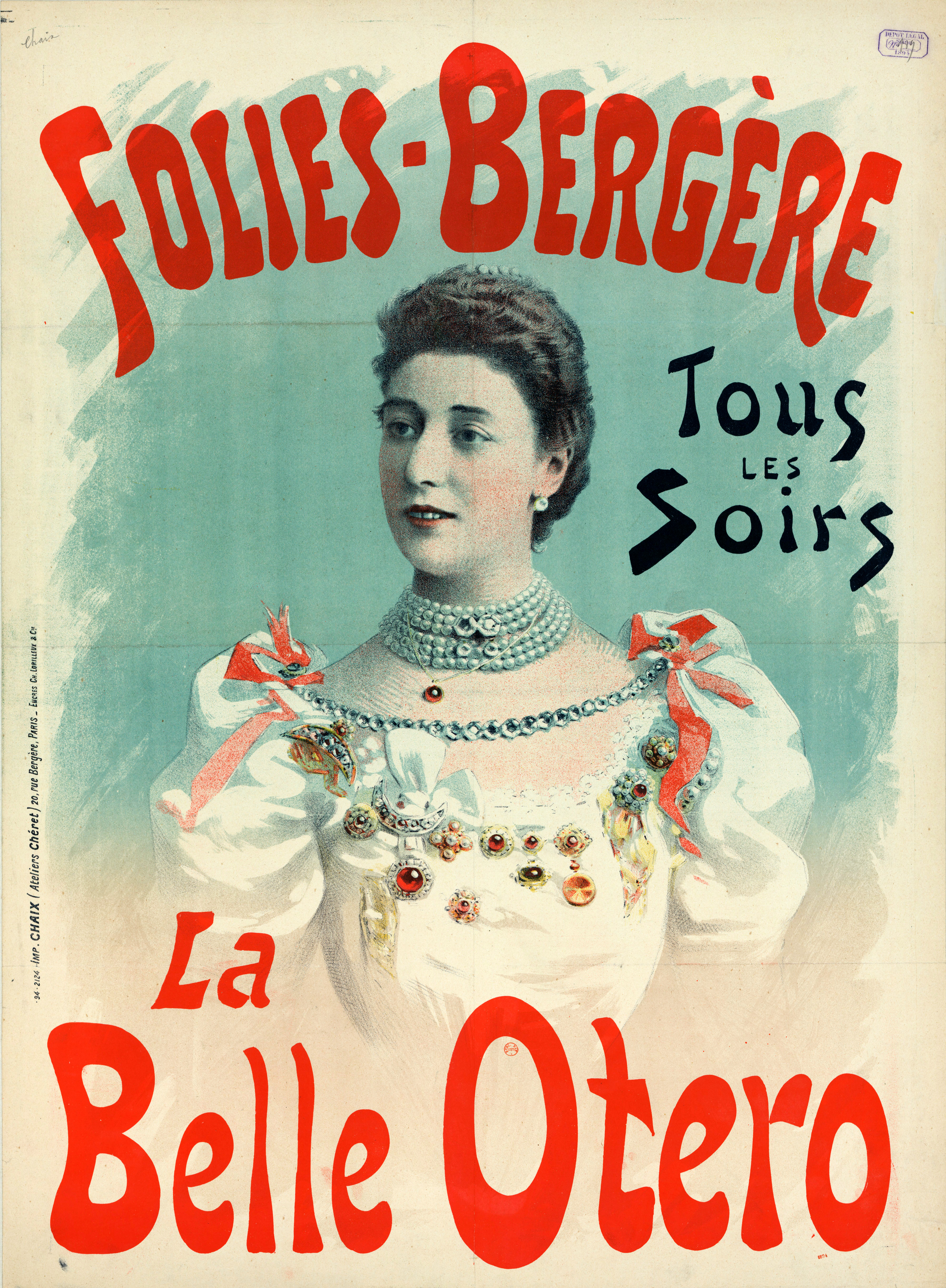
La Belle Otero at Folies-Bergère, 1894

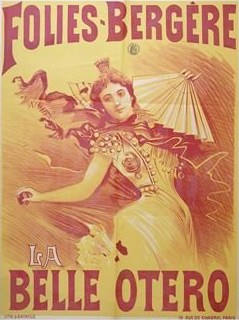
An 1894 Folies Bergère poster

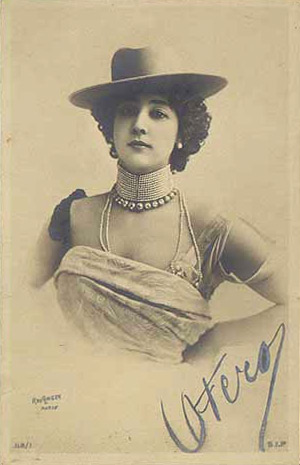
A 1905 postcard of La Belle Otero

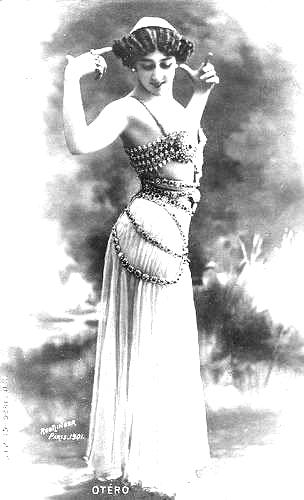
La Belle Otero, by Léopold-Émile Reutlinger

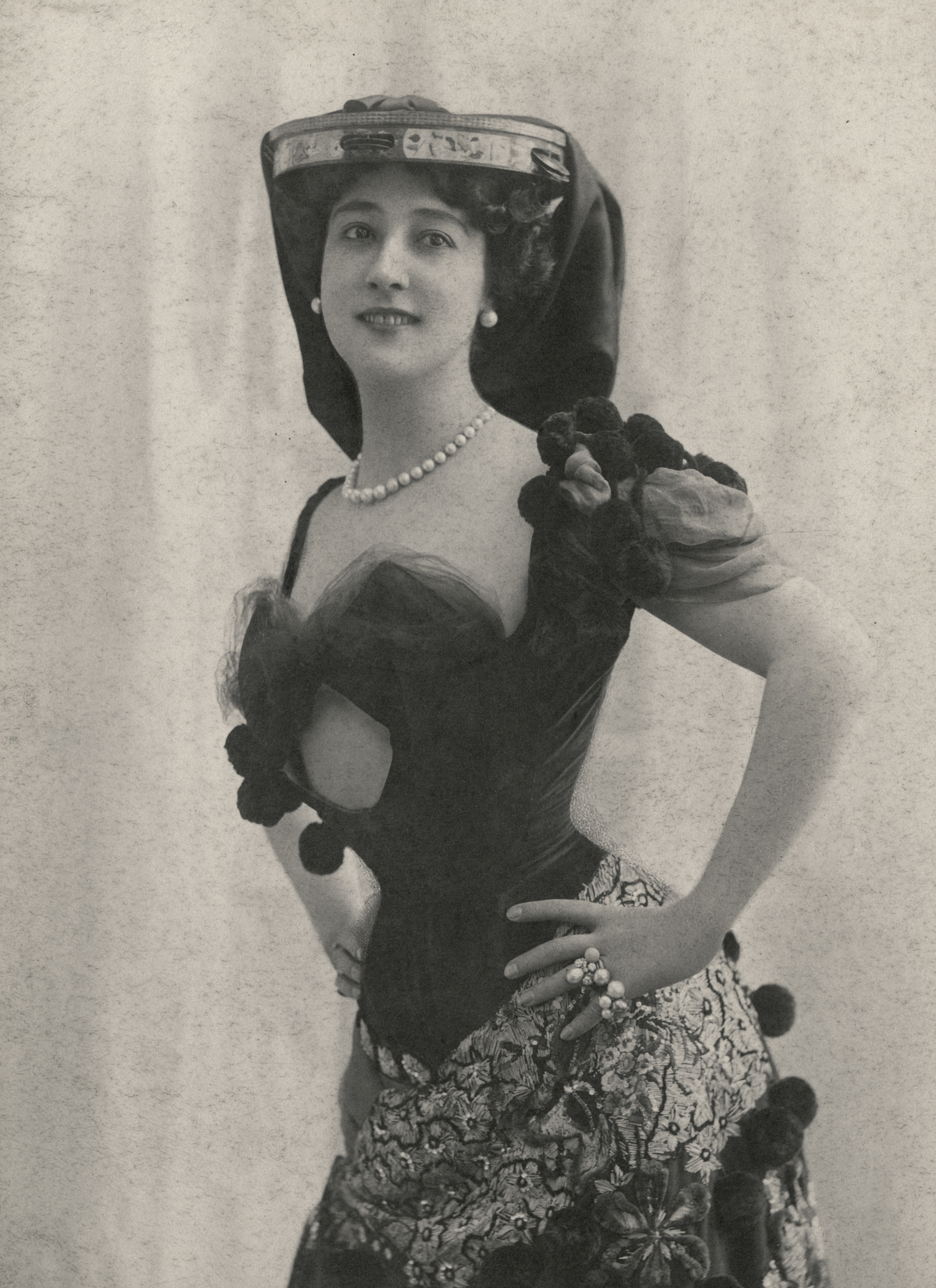
La Belle Otero by Léopold-Émile Reutlinger

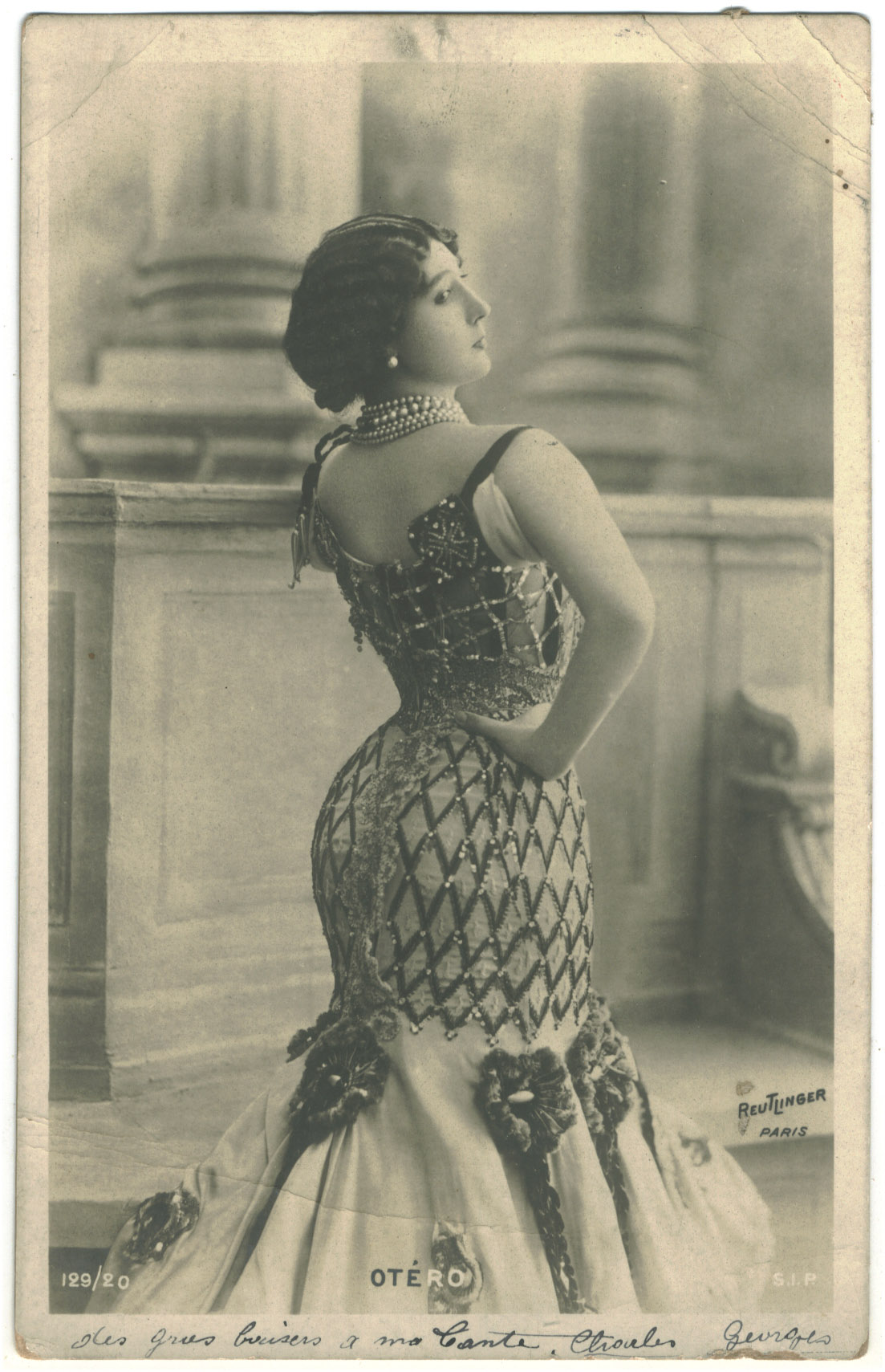
La Belle Otero by Léopold-Émile Reutlinger

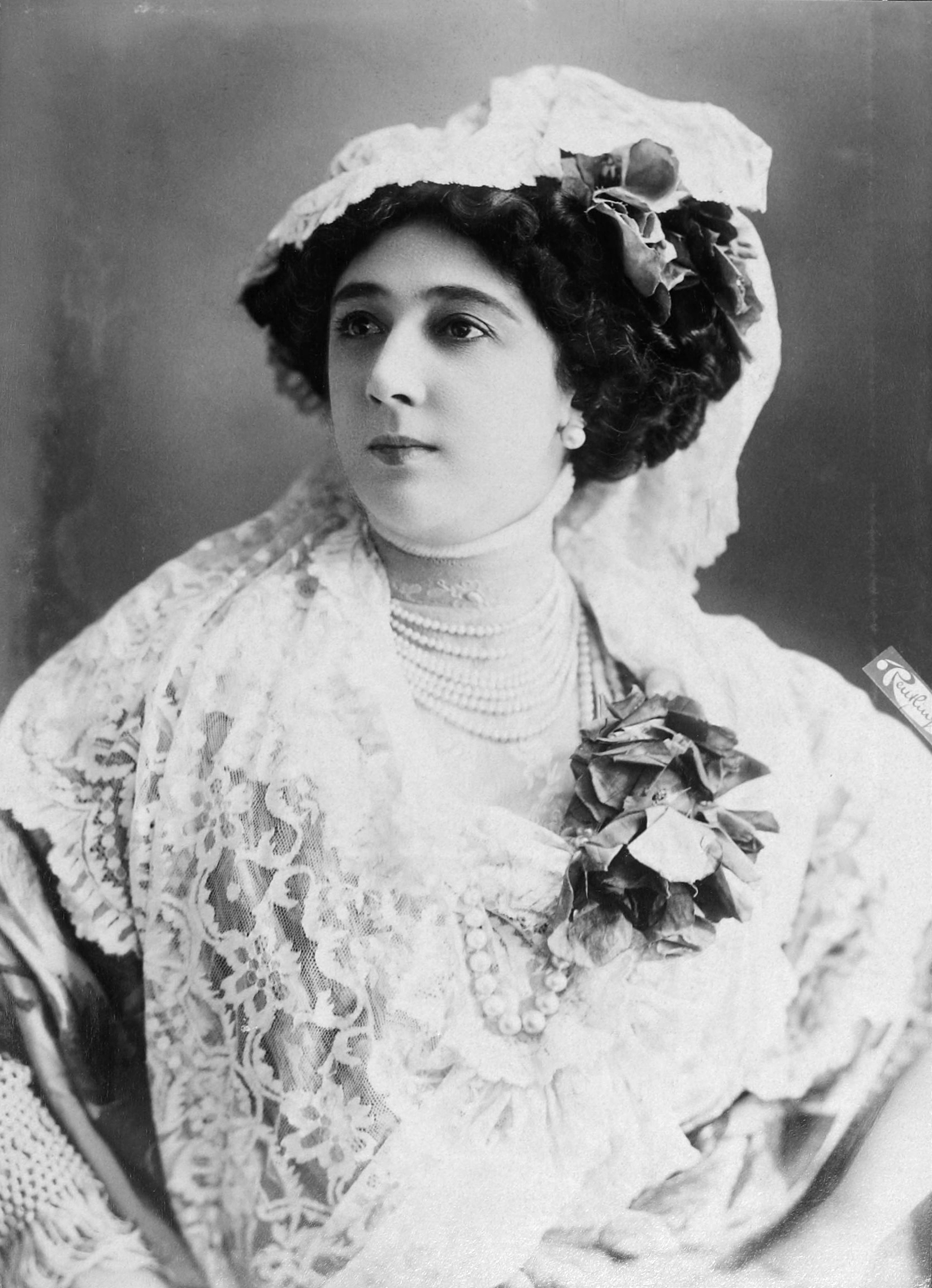
La Belle Otero by Jean Reutlinger

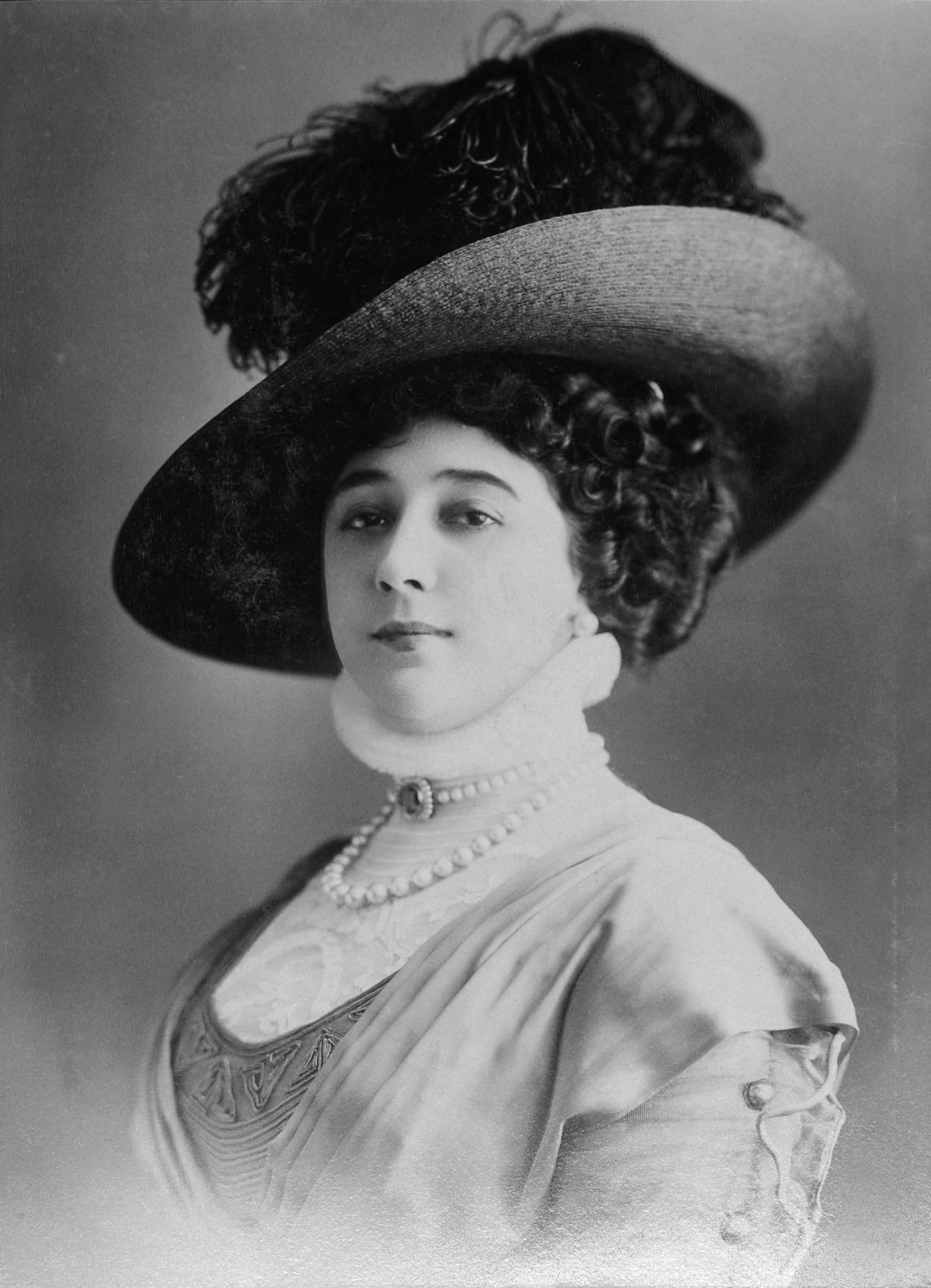
La Belle Otero by Jean Reutlinger

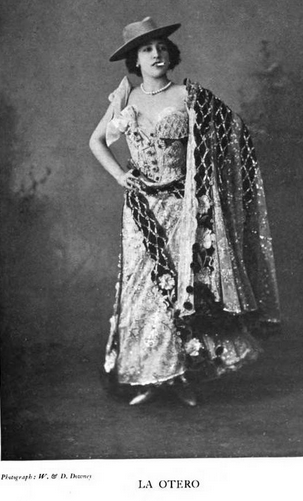
La Otero from a 1912 publication

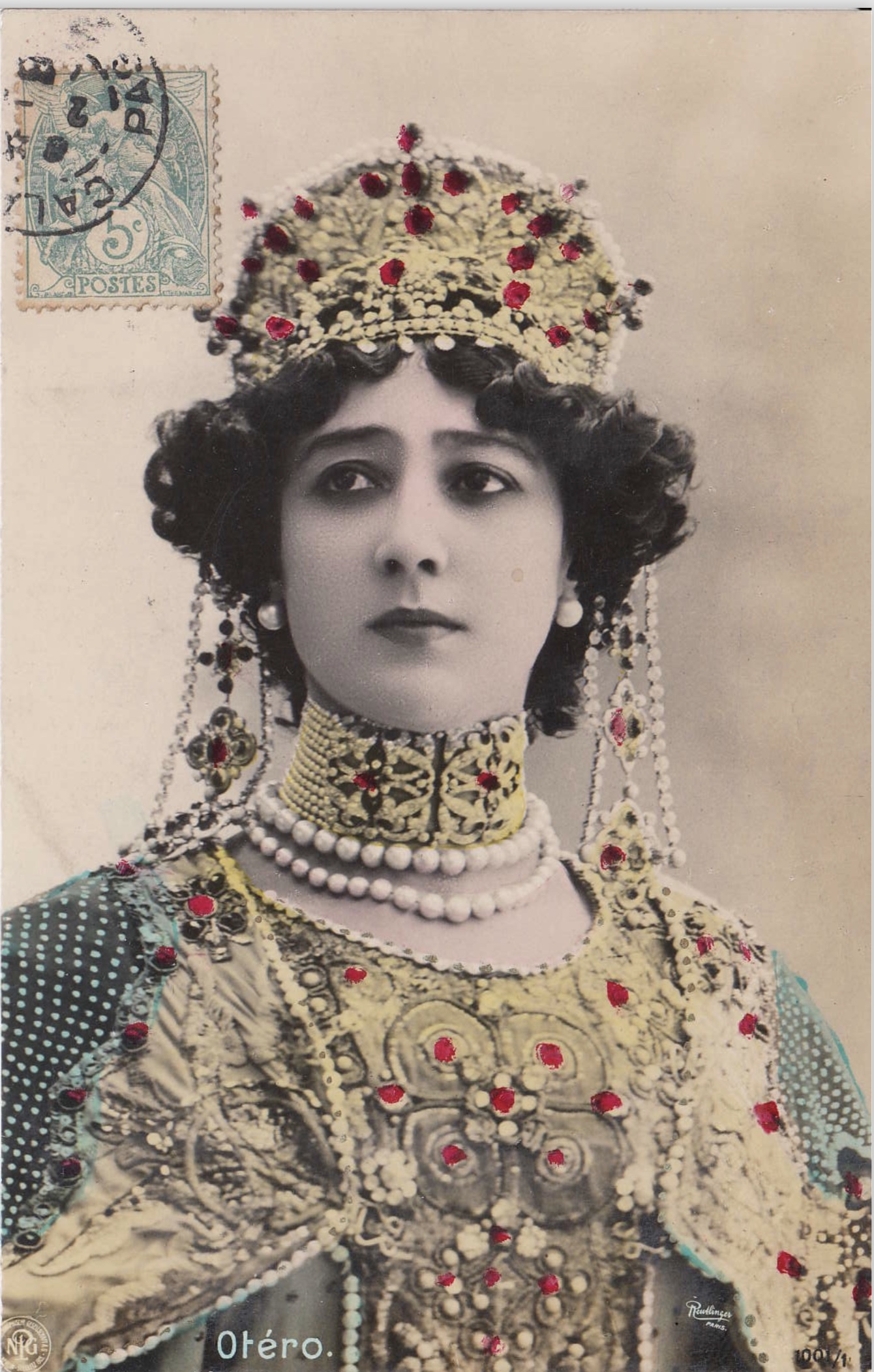
Vintage postcard of La Belle Otero

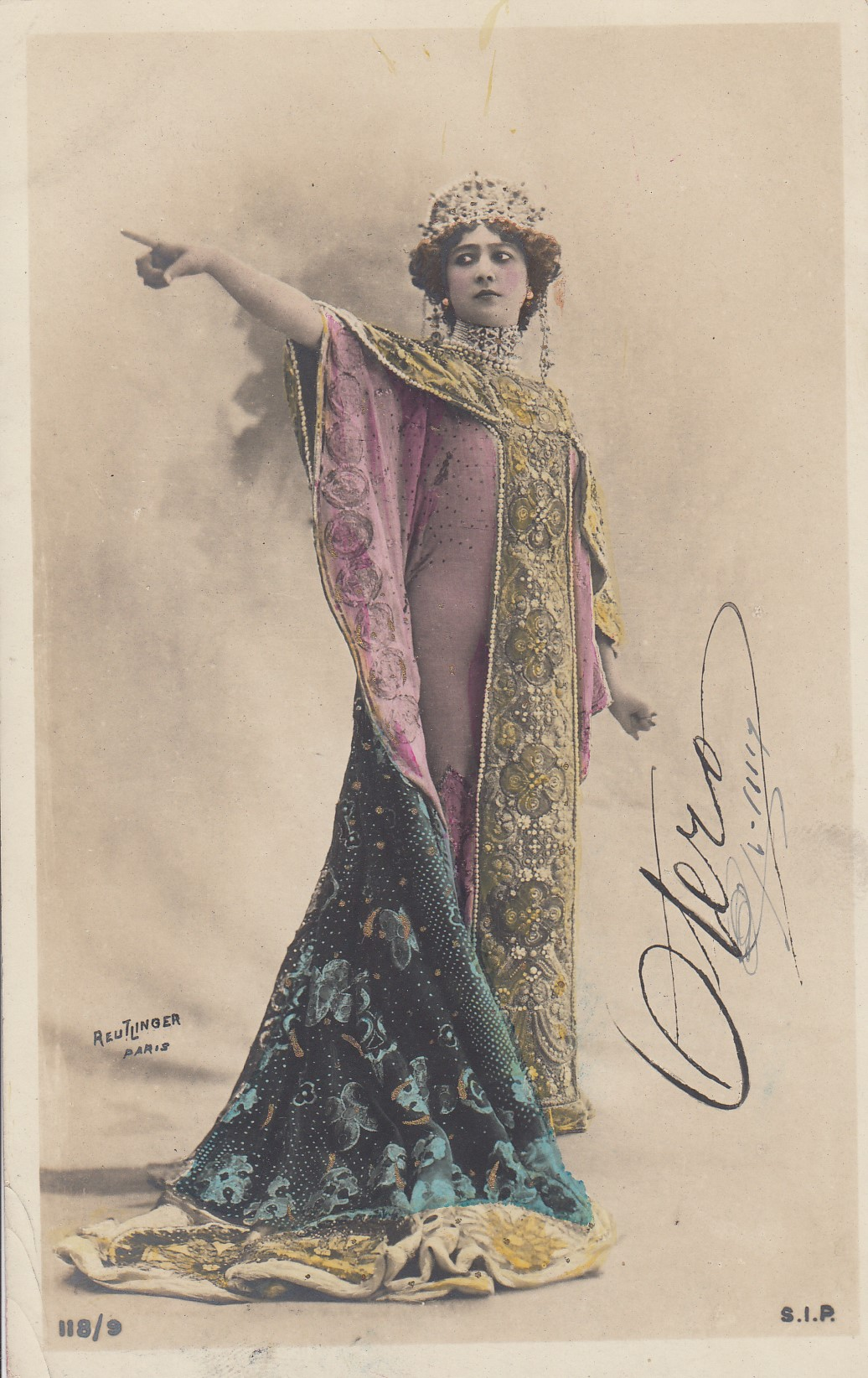
Vintage postcard of La Belle Otero by Léopold-Émile Reutlinger

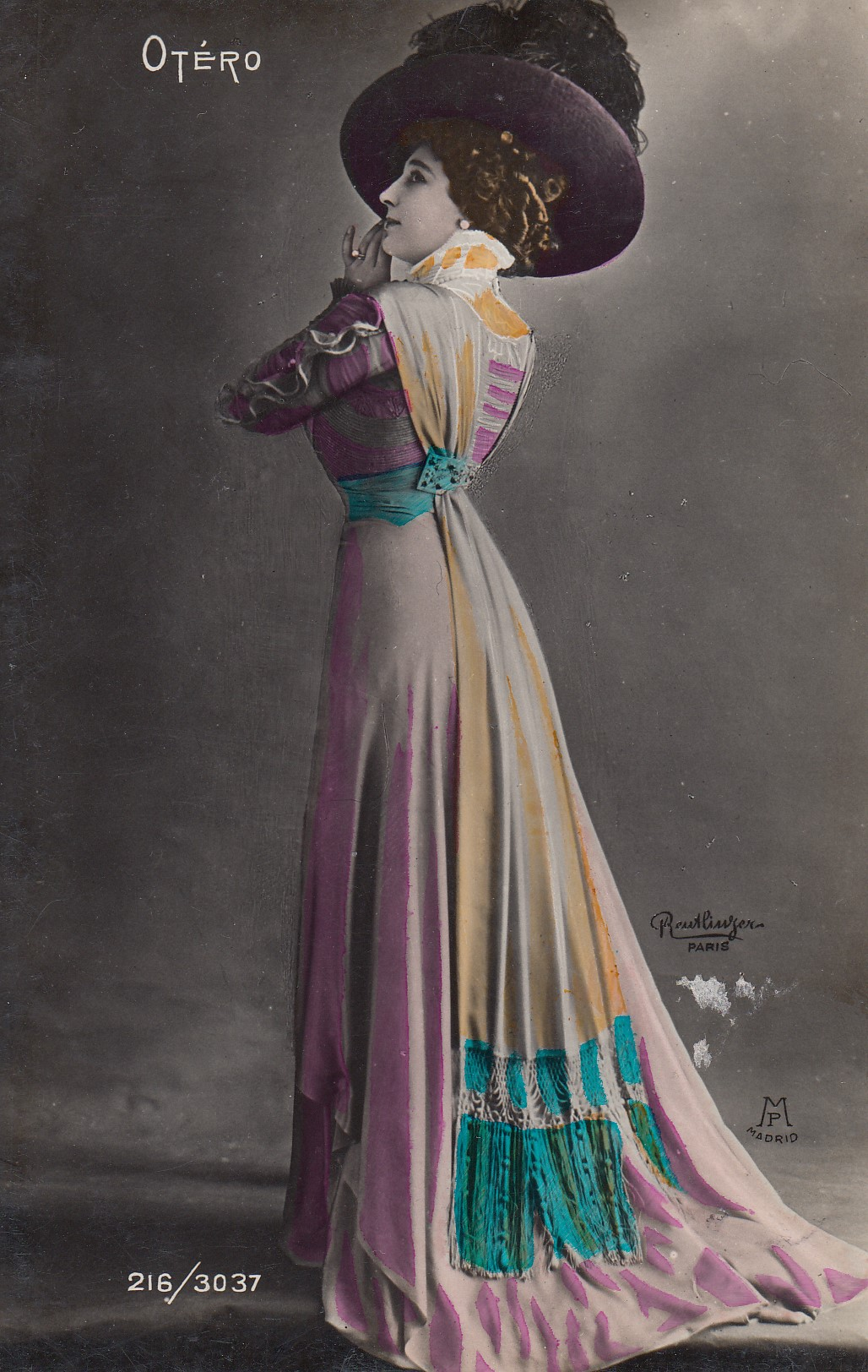
Hand tinted postcard of La Belle Otero by Léopold-Émile Reutlinger

== See also ==
- Hispagnolisme
- Women in dance
