= Jean Reutlinger =

French photographer

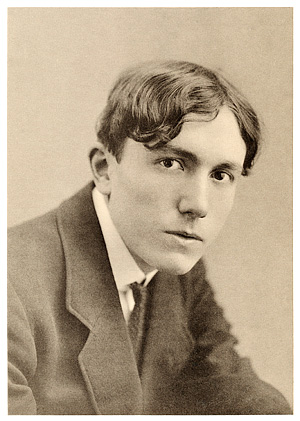
- Born: John Léo Reutlinger; 19 March 1891; Paris, France
- Died: 22 August 1914 (aged 23); Lexy, France
- Resting place: Montparnasse Cemetery
- Years active: 1910–1914
- Partner: Germaine Schroeder (1911–1914)
- Parents: Léopold-Émile Reutlinger (father); Jeanne Seure (mother)
- Relatives: Émile Reutlinger (grandfather); Cécile Sorel (aunt); Charles Reutlinger (granduncle)
- Awards: Médaille militaire Croix de Guerre

Jean Reutlinger (born John Léo Reutlinger; 19 March 1891 – 22 August 1914) was a French photographer.

== Biography ==
Jean Reutlinger was born John Léo Reutlinger on 19 March 1891 in the 2nd arrondissement of Paris, the first child to photographer Léopold-Émile Reutlinger and Jeanne Françoise Emma Seure (1871–1955). Jean came from a successful German-Jewish family of photographers – his granduncle, Charles Reutlinger, immigrated from Karlsruhe to Paris in 1850 and founded the family's photography business, and his grandfather was the photographer Émile Reutlinger. His father, Léopold-Émile, specialized in photographing stars of entertainment venues such as the Moulin Rouge and the Folies Bergère, and was a pioneer of erotic photography. His maternal aunt was the theatre actress Cécile Sorel. Jean had three younger siblings, sisters Yvonne (1896–1898) and Simone Hélène (1899–1967), and brother Jacques Roger (1901–1942).

Reutlinger grew up in Paris and with his maternal grandparents who lived in Orry-la-Ville. He traveled to Baden-Baden in Germany several times to visit his paternal grandparents, and as a young adult he traveled to England and the US.

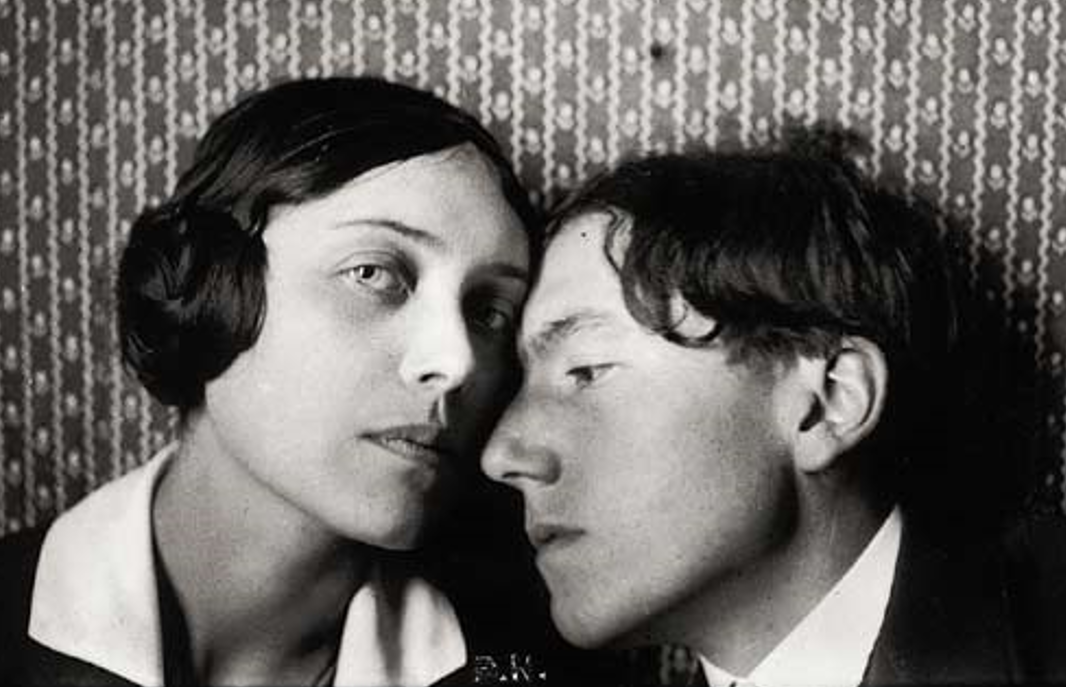
Reutlinger and Schroeder in 1913

From 1910 to 1914 he worked with his father at his studio on 21 Boulevard Montmartre. He produced thousands of photographs in sepia and black and white, and experimented with autochrome, an early form of color photography. His photography subjects included La Belle Otero, Anna Held, Cléo de Mérode, Gabrielle Réjane, Geneviève Lantelme, Valentine de Saint-Point, and his girlfriend, the bookbinder Germaine Schroeder. He often posed his models in a comedic, tragic, or classical style.

Reutlinger, who was athletic and enjoyed sports, befriended and photographed the German athlete and sculptor Hanns Braun. In Paris, Reutlinger frequented circles of writers who also practiced rhythmic gymnastics, similar to eurythmy. He also photographed himself in various athletic positions, and worked as a fencer. In 1912, he participated in the University of Paris' masters athletics. Under various pseudonyms, one of them being Doriane G., an homage to Oscar Wilde, he wrote sports articles for La Vasque and L'Auto, amongst others. In addition to his sports articles, he also published poetry in La Vasque with Schroeder.

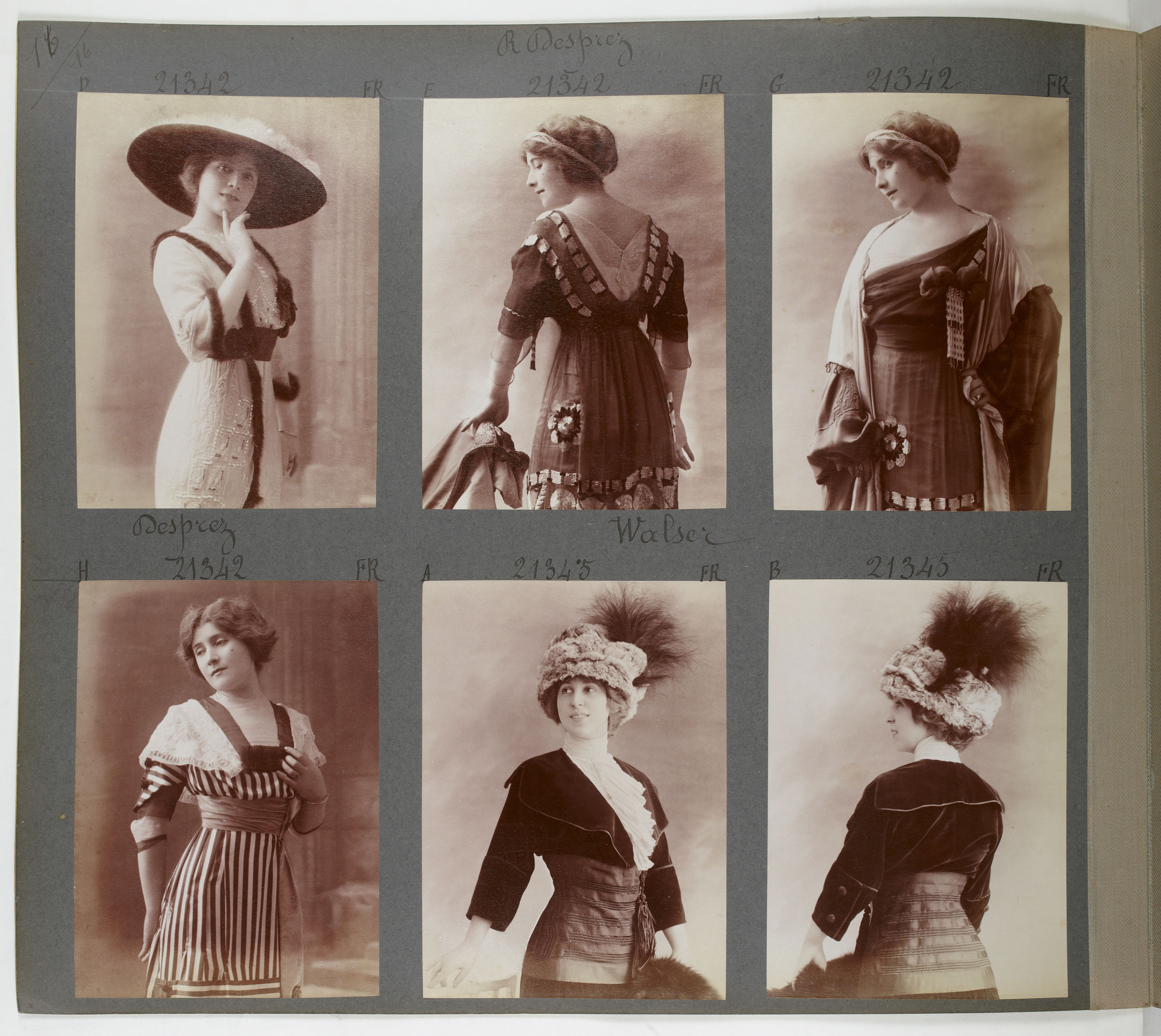
Portraits

In October 1913, Reutlinger was conscripted into the army and joined the 92nd Infantry Regiment. At the beginning of World War I, Reutlinger asked Schroeder to visit his garrison in order to give her numerous personal documents "as if he had foreseen his death". Reutlinger died in the Battle of the Ardennes on 22 August 1914; he was wounded twice and continued to fight before being fatally wounded. At the time of his death, he was attached to the 67th Regiment during the offensive towards La Chiers. He was buried at Montparnasse Cemetery alongside his sister Yvonne. His parents and two siblings were buried with them upon their deaths. After his death, Schroeder looked after his estate. Reutlinger's photographs are now preserved at the Bibliothèque nationale de France.

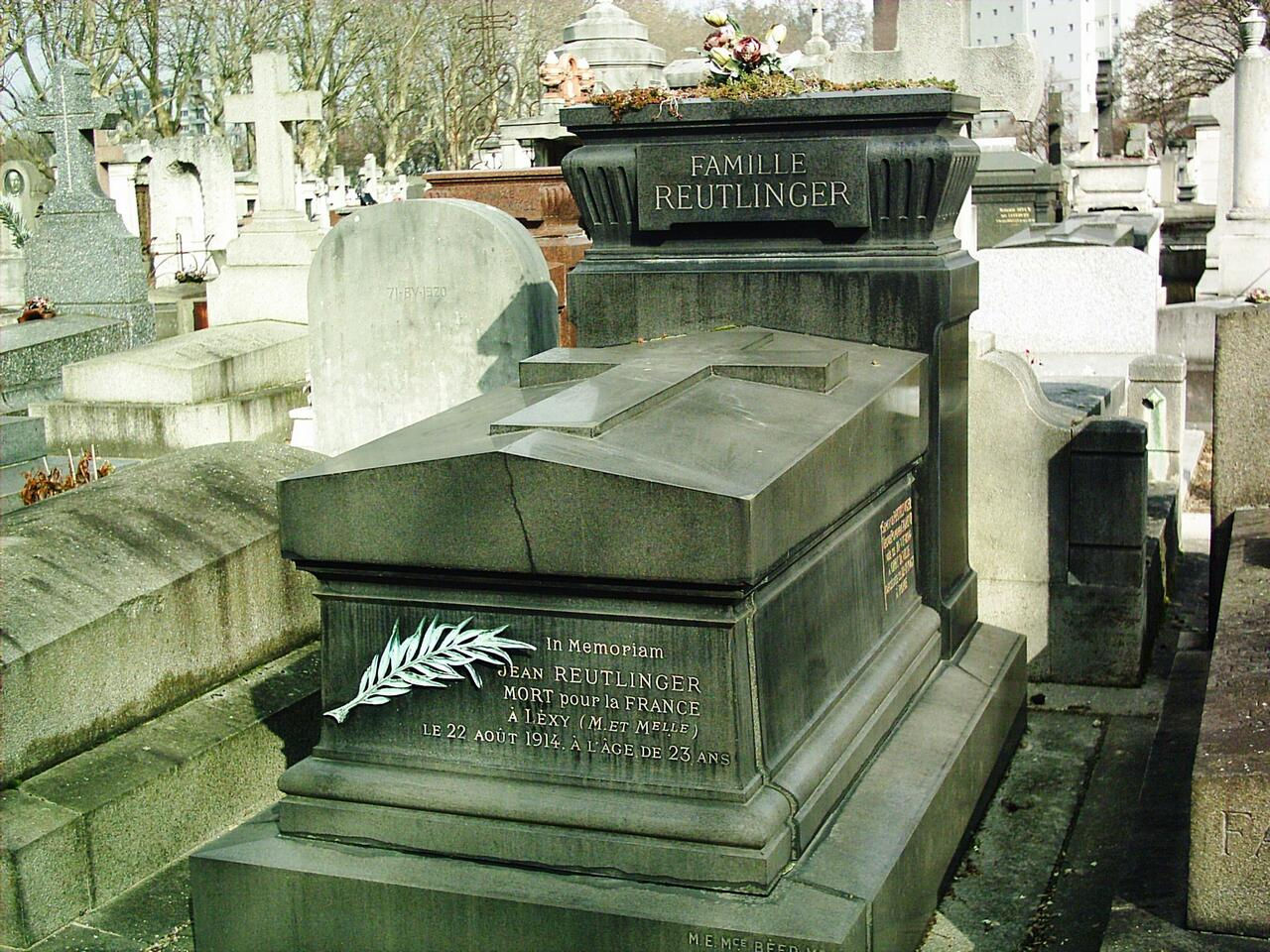
The Reutlinger family tomb at Montparnasse Cemetery

In 1917, the diplomat Pierre Combret de Lanux said of him in his book Young France and New America, "My friends Alain-Fournier, Baguenier-Désormeaux, Jean Reutlinger, Armand de Montoussém – and my countless brothers whose names I do not know – you were the best among us and now you leave a heavy task for us to perform. We shall miss you not with the heart only; we shall miss your energies and advice." In 1922 Reutlinger was posthumously awarded the Médaille militaire and Croix de Guerre and honoured as Mort pour la France.
