= Hispagnolisme =

French aesthetic craze for Spanish things

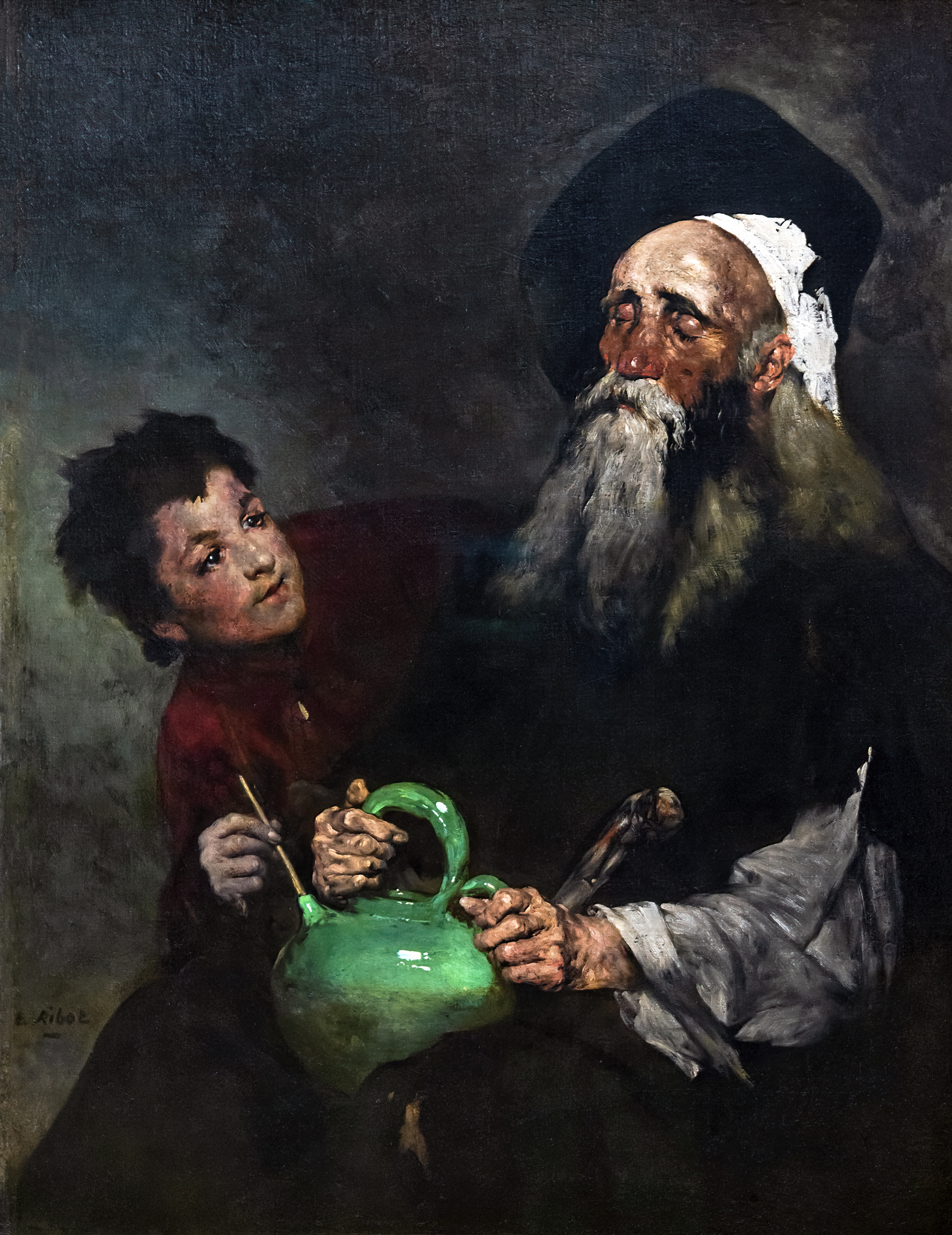
Lazarillo de Tormes and his blind master, Théodule Ribot, 1870s

Hispagnolisme (French: espagnolisme) is the inordinate love of all things Spanish, a craze for which spread through French society, and much of the associated art world, in the 19th century.

== Origins ==
Hispagnolisme first began to emerge in the 18th century, as seen in figures like Fragonard. It received a powerful impetus from Napoleon's Spanish campaigns, during the Peninsular War; and took off fully in French society in and after the 1830s.

== Apex ==
Writers like Merimee, and musicians like Bizet, profited from, and also helped foster, Hispagnolisme; as did such painters as Manet, with his Spanish-derived masterpiece Le Déjeuner sur l’herbe.

In Britain, hispagnolisme had an influence on artists such as Sargent.

Hispagnolisme was still powerful enough in Paris at the close of the century for Pablo Picasso to finance his early stays there with pictures of bullfights and Spanish peasant themes.

== See also ==
- Empress Eugenie
- Hispanism
- Japonerie
- La Belle Otero
