= Émile Reutlinger =

German-French photographer (1825–1907)

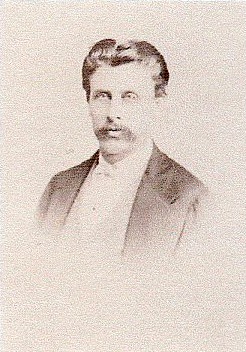
- Reutlinger. c. 1860
- Born: Emil August Reutlinger; August 27, 1825; Karlsruhe, Grand Duchy of Baden
- Died: August 9, 1907 (aged 81); Baden-Baden, German Empire
- Resting place: In the familial grave at Baden-Baden
- Spouse: Amelia Ellen Horn
- Children: 4 (only two survived infancy): Leopold Reutlinger and Juanita Reutlinger
- Relatives: Carl Reutlinger (brother), Juana Binz (granddaughter)
- Family: Reutlinger family

Émile Reutlinger (born Emil August Reutlinger, August 27, 1825 – August 9, 1907) was a German-born French photographer. He was the younger brother of Charles Reutlinger and the father of Léopold-Émile Reutlinger.

== Biography ==
Emil August Reutlinger was born on August 27, 1825, in Karlsruhe, then a part of the Grand Duchy of Baden in the German Confederation. He was born into a family of German Jews.

In 1848, he emigrated to the United States, possibly residing in Memphis, Tennessee. By 1860, he was in Peru, where in Lima, he married Amelia Ellen Horn, a German Protestant, four months following the birth of their first son, Leopold. Emil would father three other children, of which two died during infancy.

During his time in Peru, he owned a number of properties in Callao, however, they were destroyed in a severe earthquake that likely occurred in 1868. What exactly he did for a living there is mysterious: contemporary records describe him as an "artist".

In 1870, Émile and his family returned to Europe, migrating to Stuttgart and then Paris, where in 1876, his daughter Juanita was born. After 1870, Emil became involved in his brother Charles's photographing business in Paris. Around that time, he began to go as Émile. In 1880, Charles's company, Ch. Reutlinger, was granted to Émile by Charles.

At an exhibition of the Union Centrale des Arts Décoratifs, Reutlinger was awarded a silver medal. In 1888, the Ch. Reutlinger division in Minneapolis won a medal from the Photographer's Association of America for a series of photographs produced by the company. Reutlinger began to gradually deviate from his brother's simplistic and realistic photographs.

From 1882 to 1889, he donated to the Bibliothèque nationale de France several albums of photographs of topless dancers.

Until 1883, Reutlinger worked solely with himself and his employees. In that year however, he began urging his son Leopold to aid him. Leopold and Émile's photography style were fairly similar and subsequently became difficult to distinguish. Due to internal familial disputes, Leopold also worked for various other photography studios during his time collaborating with his father. After a decade of work together, in 1893, Émile gave the company to Leopold, who would run the company until 1930.

The Ch. Reutlinger maintained an extensive network of business connections. On a visiting card for Pyotr Ilyich Tchaikovsky that is currently owned by the New York Public Library, three agencies are listed: the German: New Photographic Society in Berlin-Steglitz; the French Société Industrielle de Photographie in Rueil (Rueil-Malmaison near Paris), and the British Rotary Photographic Company in London. Whether these connections were established under Charles or Émile remains the subject of debate, however, it is generally believed that Charles created them. In addition to the aforementioned visiting card, there was also one from Émile and his wife Amelia.

In the early 1890s, Émile and his family moved to the German spa town of Baden-Baden. There, he died on 9 August 1907, just 18 days before his 82nd birthday. He was buried in his family grave by his house, along with Amelia and Juanita too when they died. A photography studio in Mannheim that still exists today would be founded and ran by his granddaughter, Juana Binz, until 1970.

== Gallery ==
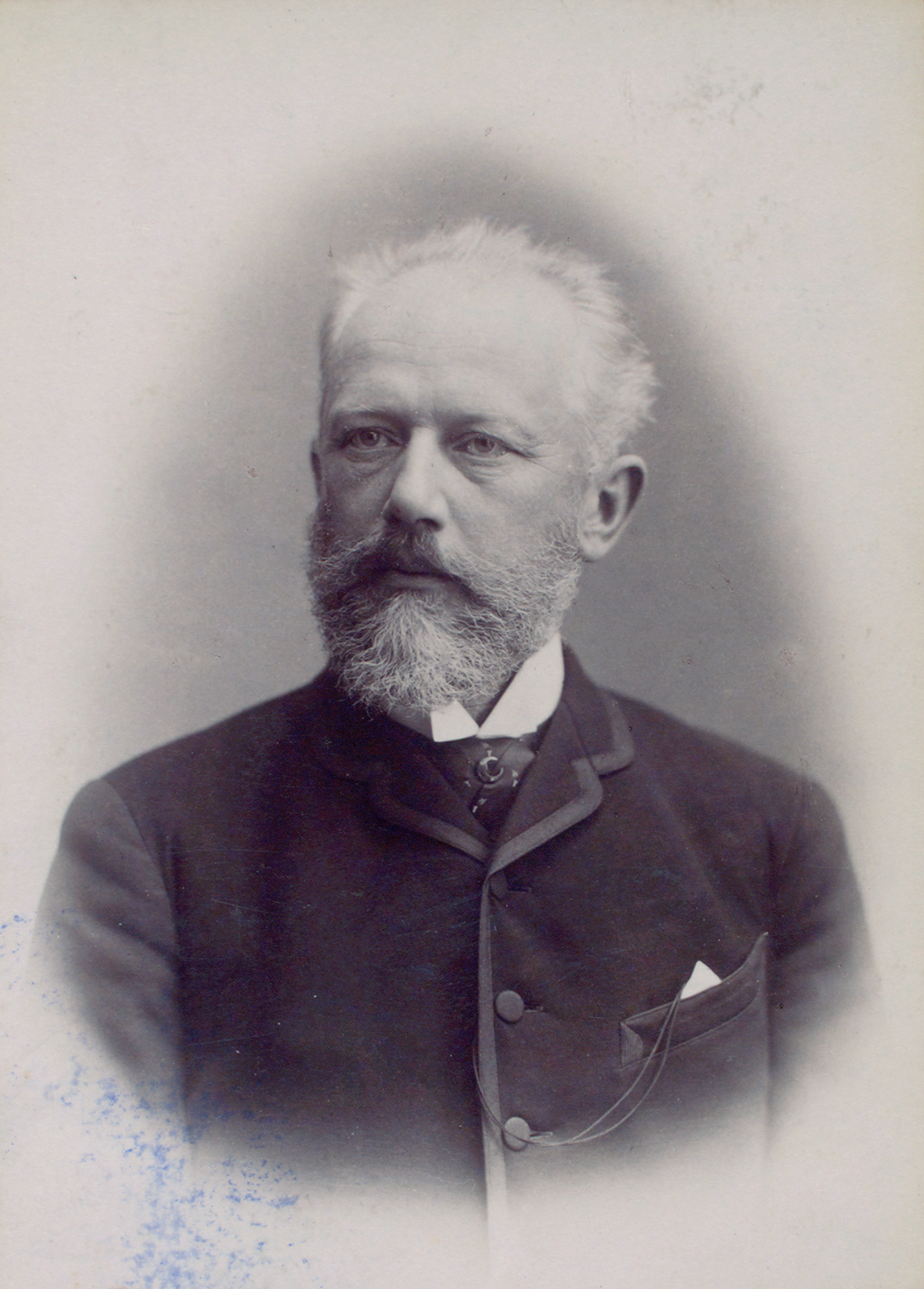
1888 photo of Pyotr Ilyich Tchaikovsky

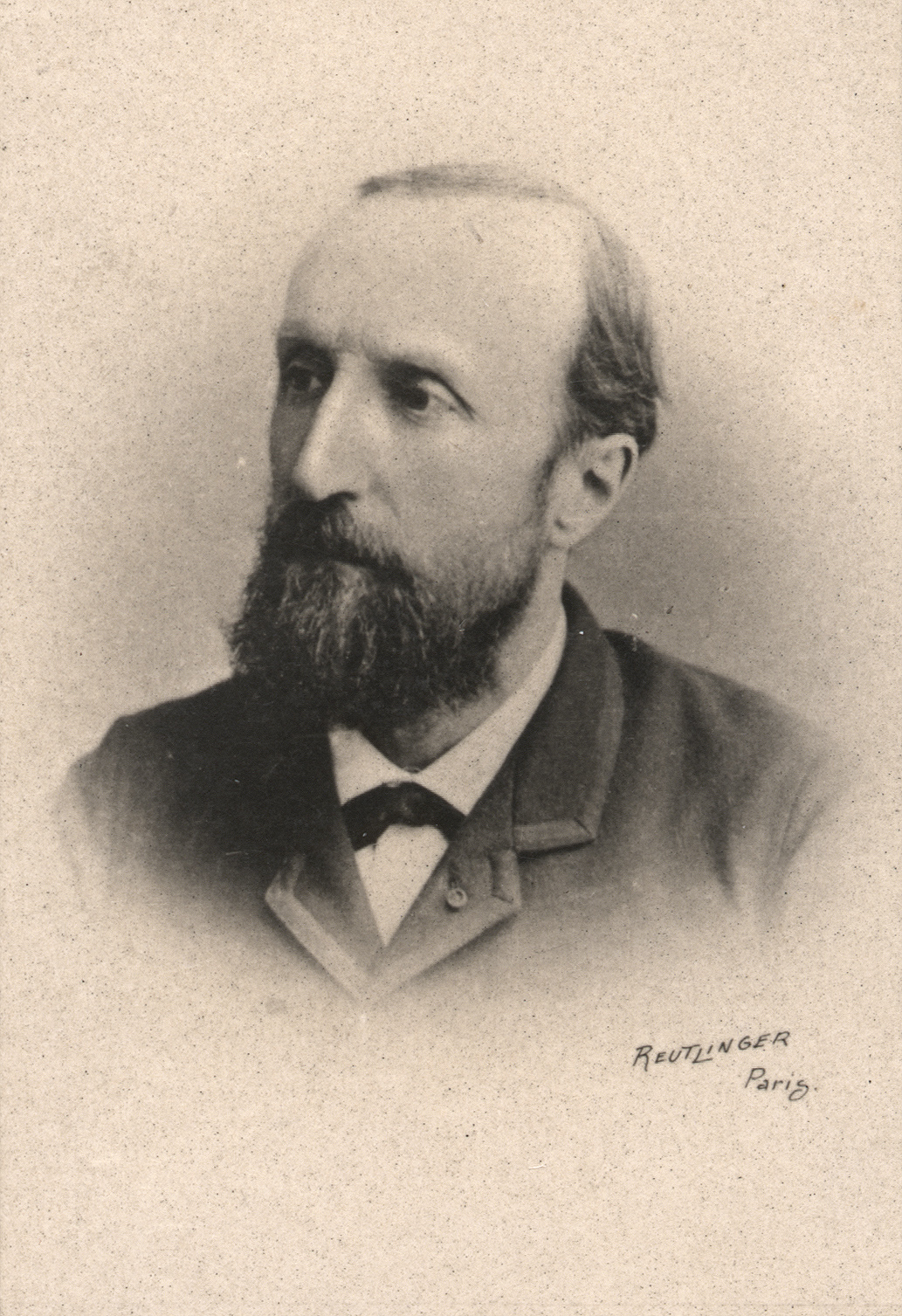
Jules Dalou. Photo taken prior to 1893.

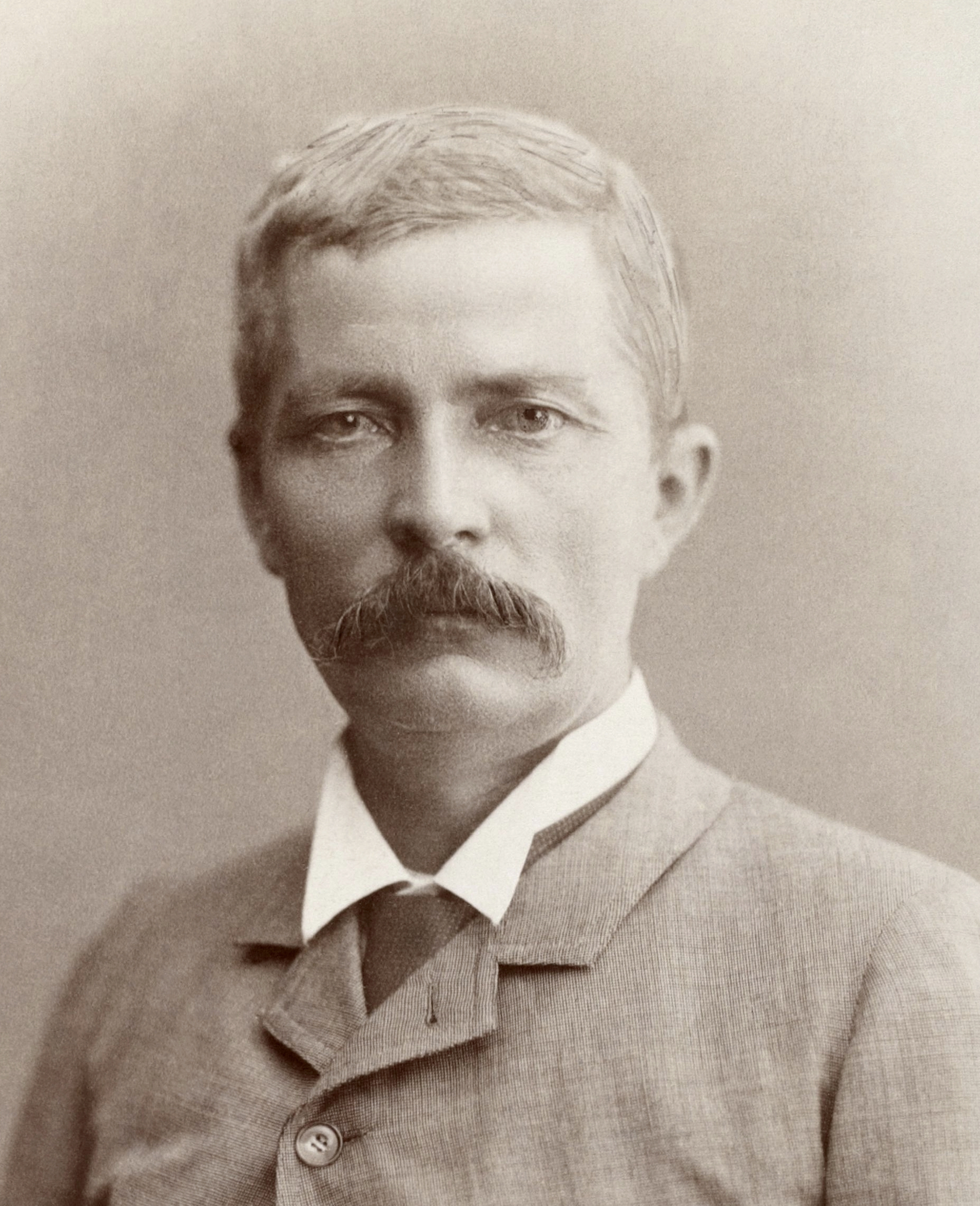
Welsh-American journalist Henry Morton Stanley, taken on August 20, 1884

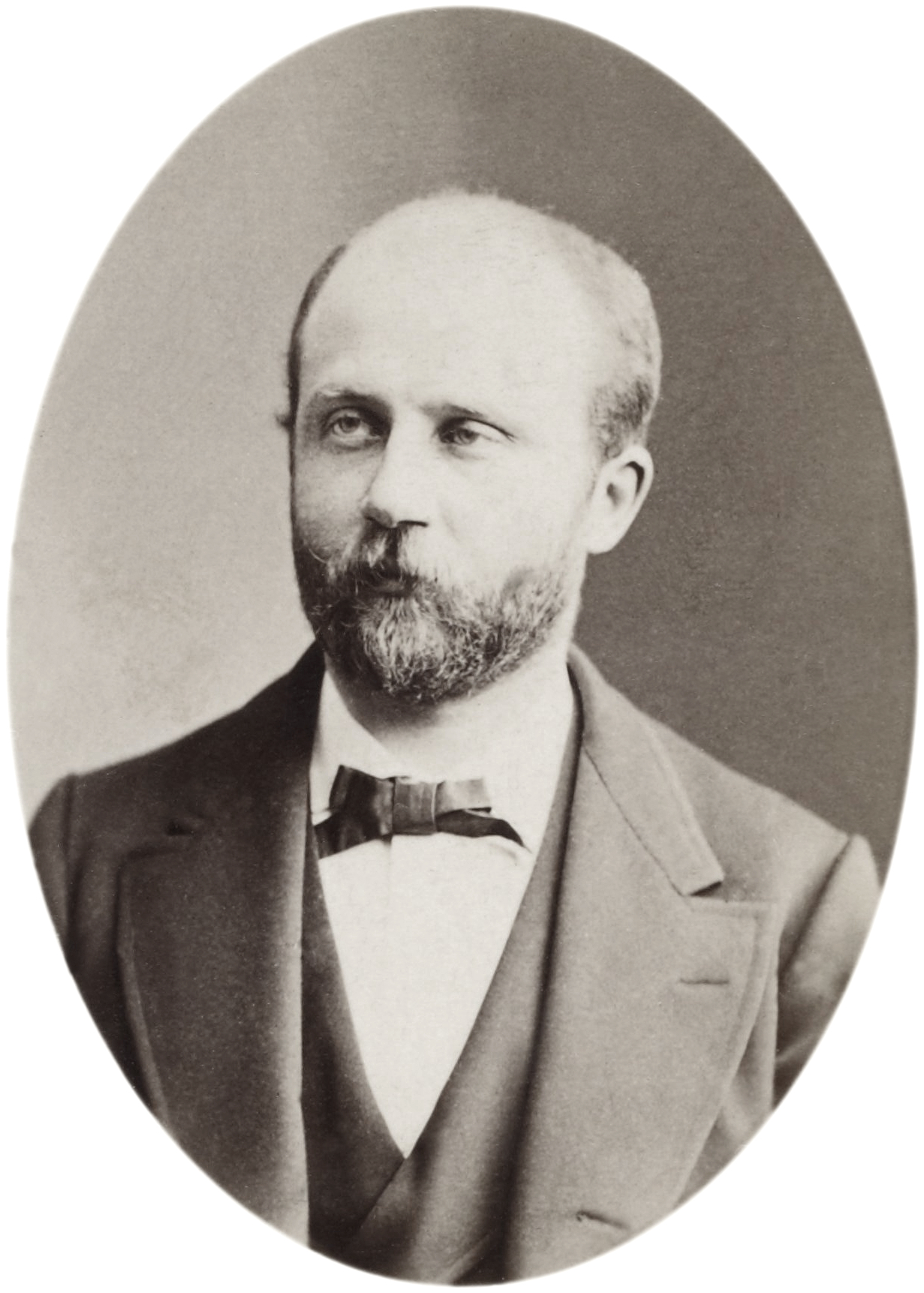
French Egyptologist Gaston Maspero in 1883
