= Geneviève Lantelme =

French actress and model (1883–1911)

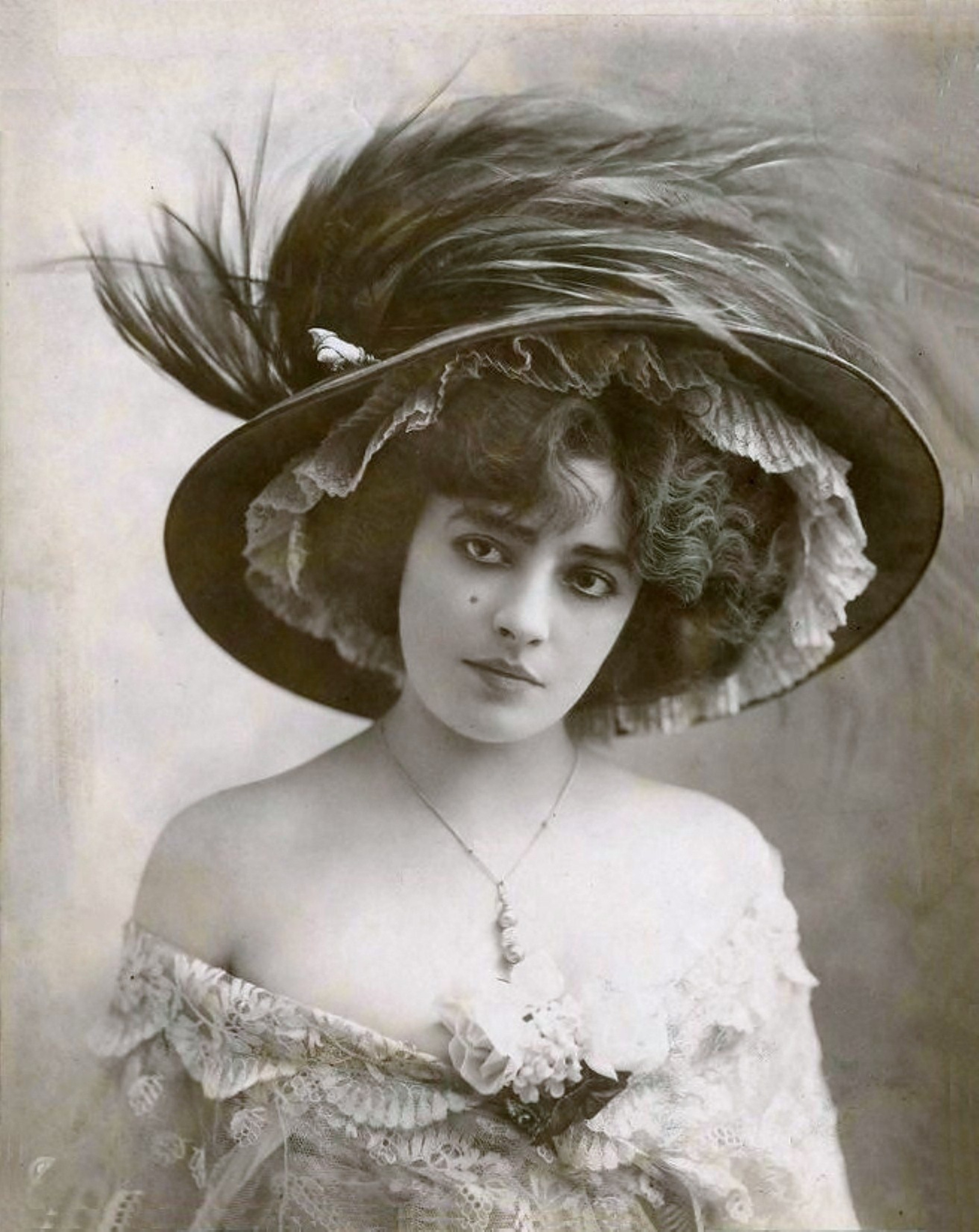
- Geneviève Lantelme, c. 1905
- Born: Mathilde Hortense Claire Fossey; 20 May 1883; Paris, French Third Republic
- Died: 24/25 July 1911 (aged 28); River Rhine
- Other name: Ginette Lantelme
- Occupations: Actress, socialite, fashion icon, courtesan
- Years active: 1901–1911
- Spouse: Alfred Edwards (m. 1909)

Geneviève Lantelme (born Mathilde Hortense Claire Fossey, 20 May 1883 – 24/25 July 1911) was a French stage actress, socialite, fashion icon, and courtesan. Considered by her contemporaries to be one of the most beautiful women of the Belle Epoque and bearing a resemblance to American actress Ethel Barrymore, she is remembered for the mysterious circumstances of her death: on the night of 24/25 July 1911, she fell from the yacht of her husband, Alfred Edwards.

== Early life ==
Mathilde Hortense Claire Fossey was born on 20 May 1883 in Paris, the third child to Edouard Fossey, a cashier who later became an accountant, and Claire Fossey (née Lantelme). Mathilde had two older sisters as well as one younger sister.

In 1895, Mathilde's parents divorced, and the court gave custody of the children to Edouard.

Another French actress of the turn of the century, Simone le Bargy, wrote about Lantelme in her memoirs, Sous de nouveaux soleils, in which she claimed, among other things, that Mathilde somehow ended up in a brothel run by her mother at the age of fourteen.

At fourteen she was one of the lures at her mother's brothel, but soon became an acclaimed Paris actress. Theatregoers savoured her reputation for enjoying the bodies of men and women with equal pleasure: her languid slouch was imitated by other Parisian vamps.

What is certain is that as a teenager, Mathilde was trafficked to powerful men, including Henry Poidatz, banker and owner of Le Matin newspaper, whose mistress she became in her late teens.

== Acting career ==
With Poidatz’ backing, Mathilde, who wanted to become an actress, embarked on a stage career, taking as her stage name her mother's maiden name, Lantelme, along with the first name, Geneviève. Poidatz recommended Lantelme to Alphonse Franck, the manager of the Théâtre du Gymnase in Paris, where she made her debut in a comedy called La Bascule on October 31, 1901, in the tiny part of a housemaid, with a few lines of dialogue.

Several small parts followed, and in October 1903, Lantelme entered the Conservatoire de Paris to study acting, where she was taught by an actor from the Comédie-Francaise named Maurice de Féraudy. Although the students of the Conservatoire were technically not allowed to perform in theatres before they graduated, Lantelme continued to appear on Parisian stages during the period of her studies, under the name of “Telmy.” Lantelme completed her course of study without receiving any prizes or distinctions, as her comedic talent was not valued by her school or her teachers, and resumed stage appearances under the name of Lantelme.

On April 1, 1905, Lantelme opened in a play called L’Age d’Aimer, whose leading role was played by the legendary actress Réjane. Upon hearing that her friend Alfred Edwards, a media tycoon and amateur playwright, had written a play named Par Ricochet and was looking for an actress, Réjane introduced him to Lantelme, who soon became his mistress.

In September 1906, Lantelme signed a contract with the Théâtre Réjane, but she broke it in January 1908 because she was frustrated that Réjane was given all of the leading roles. Réjane sued Lantelme for breach of contract and won; the young actress had to pay 20,000 francs in damages, an enormous sum at the time.

Despite this setback, 1908 was a turning point for Lantelme, because it was in this year that she finally landed a leading role in a hit play, starring in Le Roi. As a result of her success, she graced the covers of magazines like Le Theatre, Les Modes, and Femina, and appeared on dozens of postcards.

During her short career in the limelight, Lantelme was photographed often and featured in newspapers and magazines in both Europe and the United States. Celebrated for her fashion sense as well as her beauty, she frequently collaborated with Madeleine Vionnet and Jeanne Paquin, two prominent French fashion designers of her day, to produce her memorable clothing ensembles. Lantelme was also known for her voluminous hats, as can be seen in the postcards and other images of her that are collected to this day.

From 1906 to 1909, Lantelme shared Edwards’ attentions with his fourth wife, Misia Sert. Misia was extremely jealous of her husband's mistress, and said in her memoirs "I had contrived to get a photograph of Lantelme; it adorned my dressing-table, and I made desperate efforts to look like her, dress my hair in the same way, wear the same clothes." Marcel Proust used this as the model for Gilberte's jealousy of Rachel and Saint-Loup in À la recherche du temps perdu.

Eventually the younger woman won the battle for Edwards’ affections, and on July 5, 1909, Lantelme and Edwards married in Rouen, France.

== Death ==
In early July 1911, Lantelme, her husband Edwards, and a few of their friends boarded Edwards’ yacht, L’Aimée. On the night of July 24/25, Lantelme disappeared, and a few days later her body was discovered in the waters of the Rhine River. The official verdict was that the actress had drowned as the result of a tragic accident. Lantelme was also most likely under the influence of cocaine at the time of her death. However, many people speculated that Edwards had murdered his wife. In the autumn of 1911, two French newspapers, La Depéche Parlementaire and La Griffe, published their accusation that Edwards had murdered Lantelme; Edwards sued the publication for libel and won, although both newspapers escaped severe punishment.

== Gallery ==
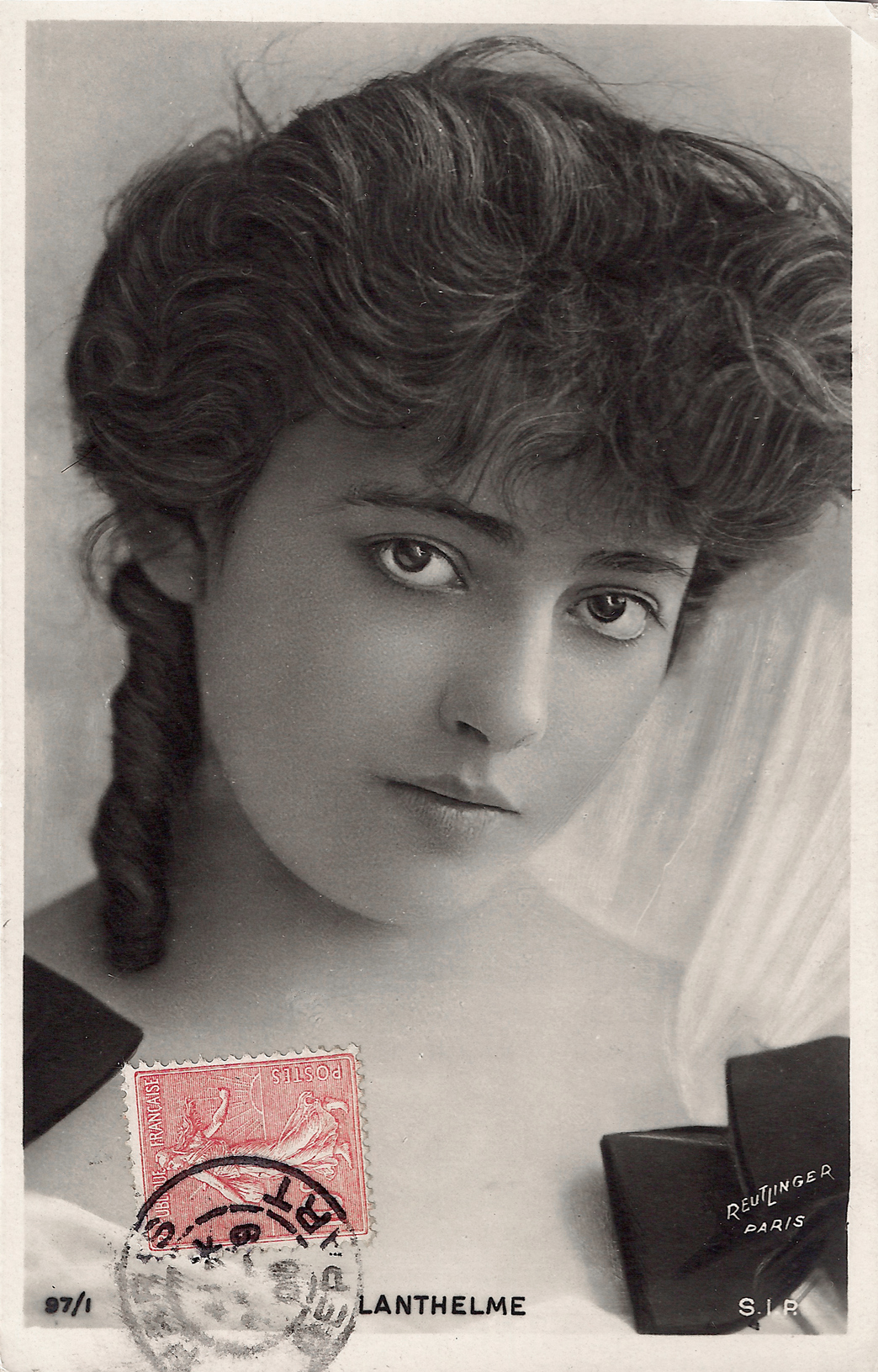
Early postcard of Lantelme, 1902

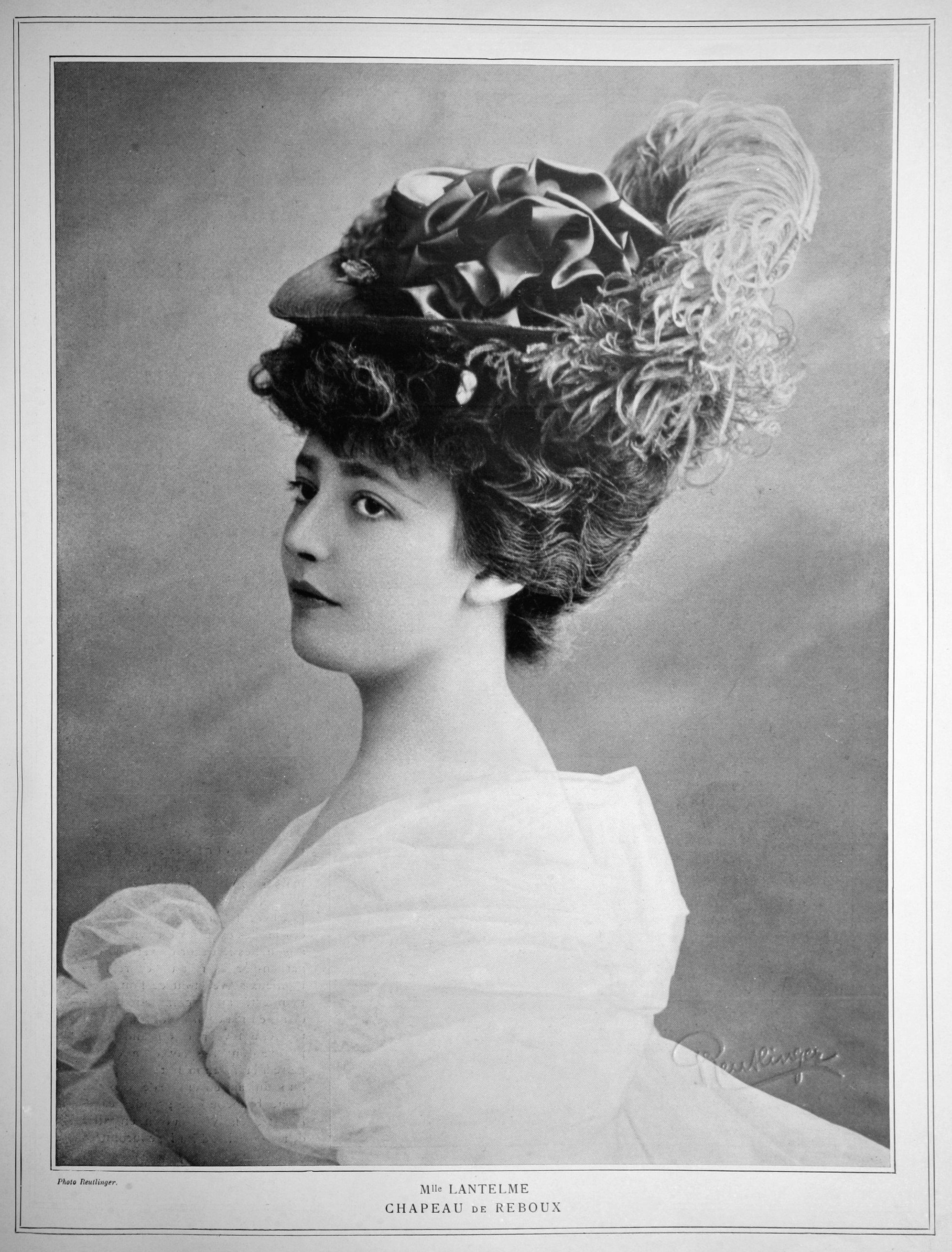
Geneviève Lantelme, in Les Modes, June 1905. Hat by Reboux

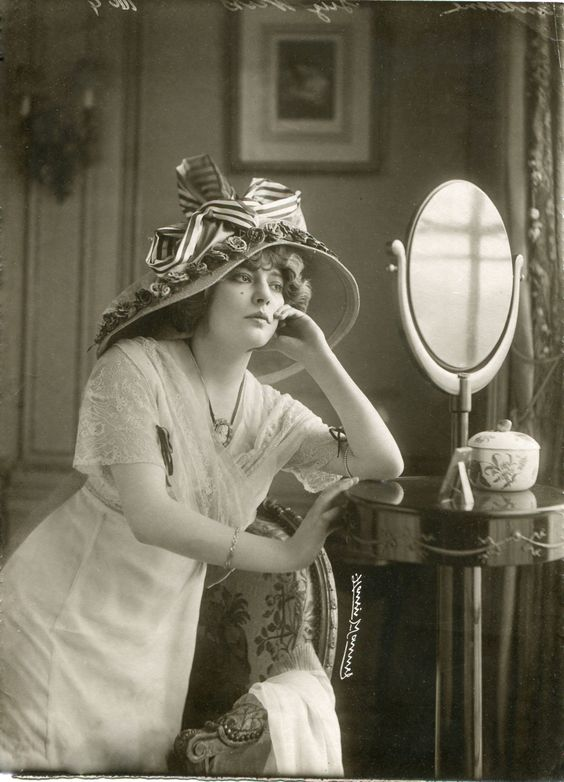
Lantelme, photographed by Henri Manuel

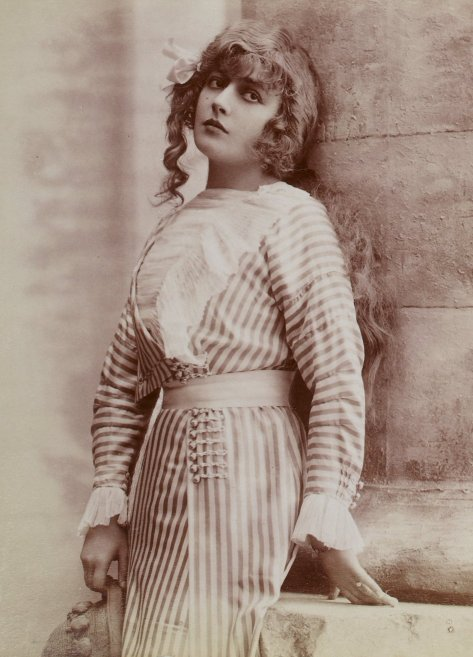
Lantelme, ca. 1900

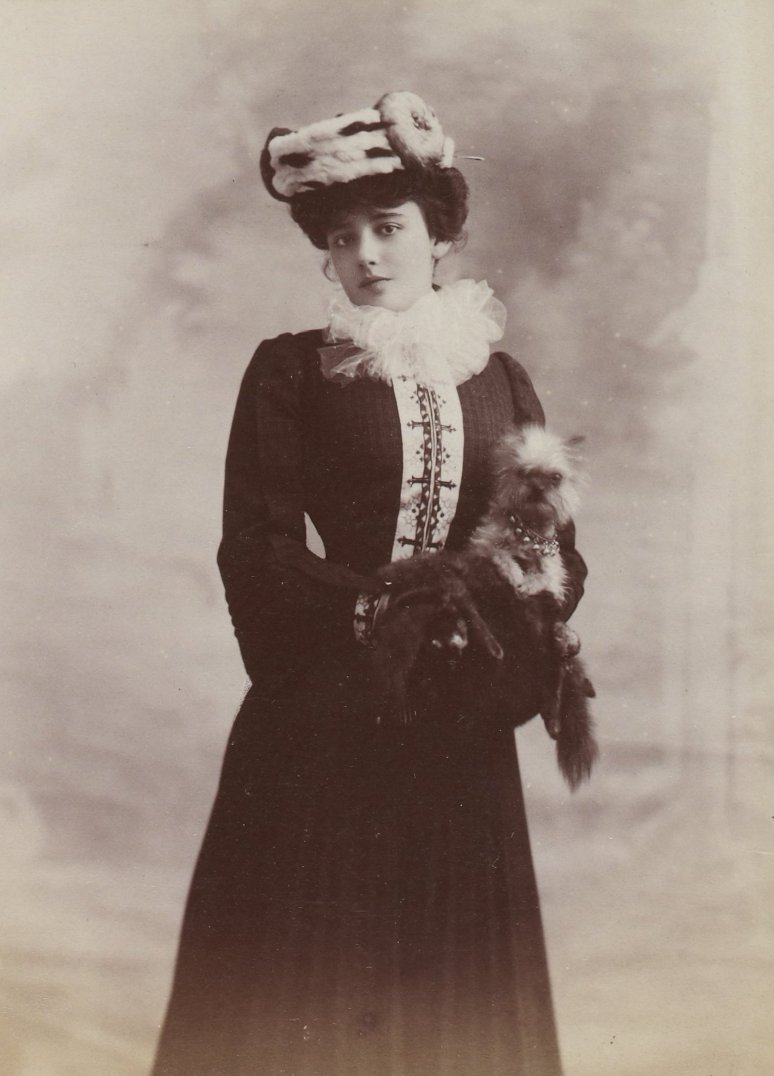
Lantelme, ca. 1900

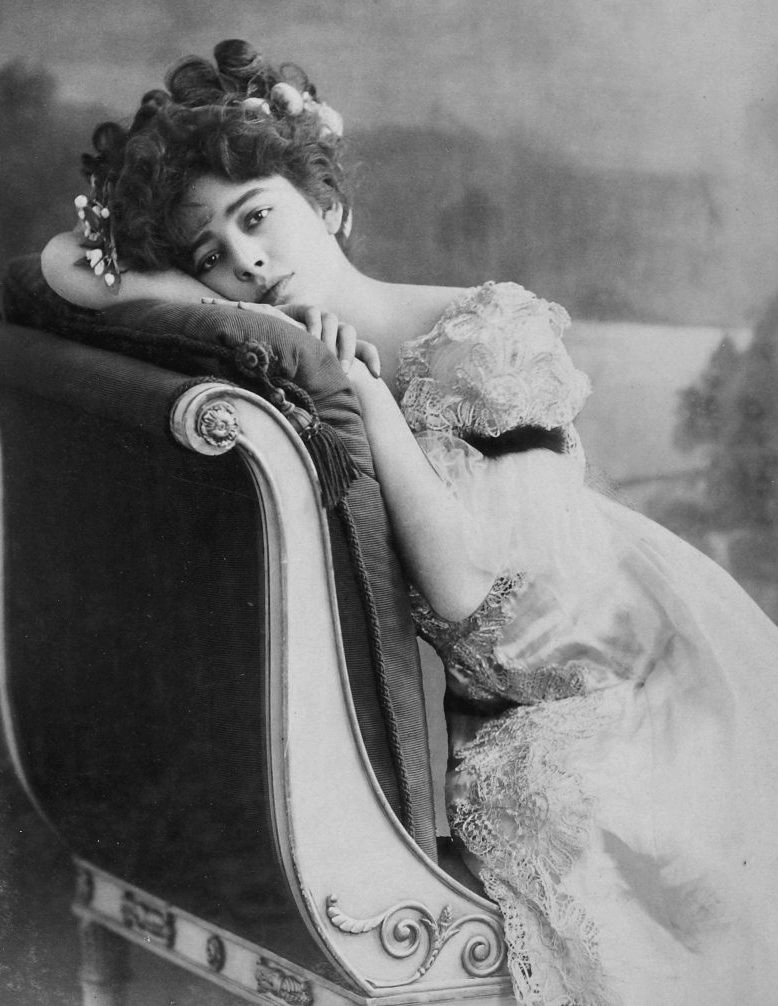
Lantelme, photographed by Léopold-Émile Reutlinger

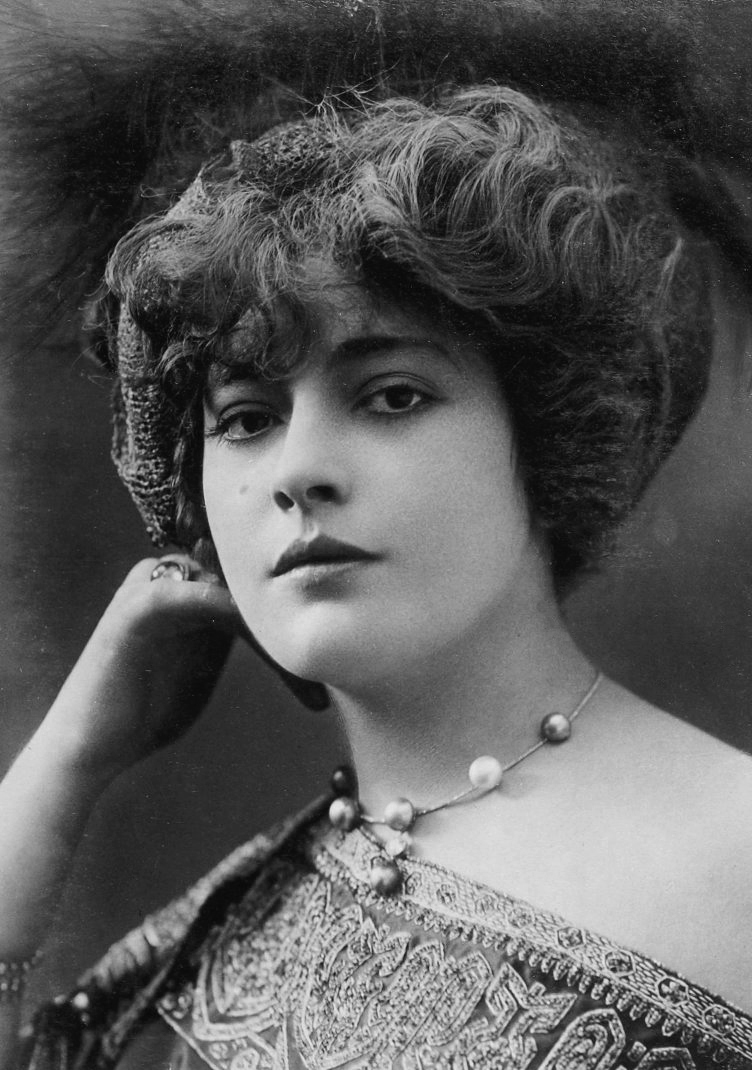
Lantelme, photographed by Reutlinger

== Bibliography ==
- Michael Lehmann: 1911: Unglück am Rhein. [About the death of Geneviève Lantelme]. Jahrbuch Kreis Wesel, ed. Kreisarchiv Wesel, 2018, pp 61–68 (in German)
