= Léopold-Émile Reutlinger =

French photographer (1863–1937)

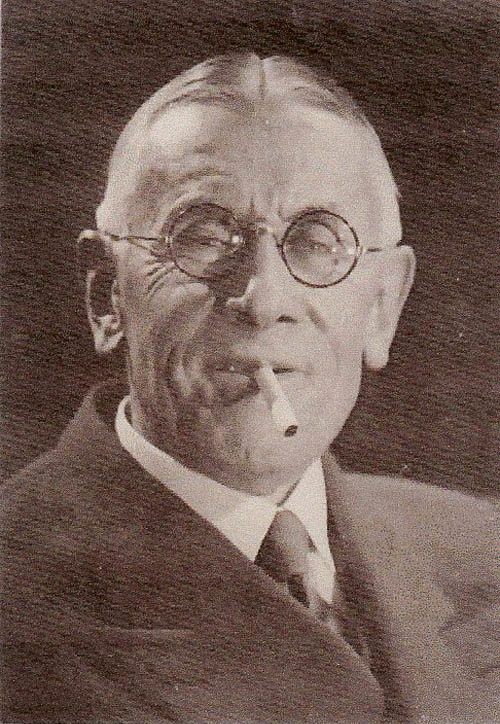
- Reutlinger, c. 1910
- Born: 17 March 1863; Callao, Peru
- Died: 16 March 1937 (aged 73); Paris, French Third Republic
- Occupation: Photographer

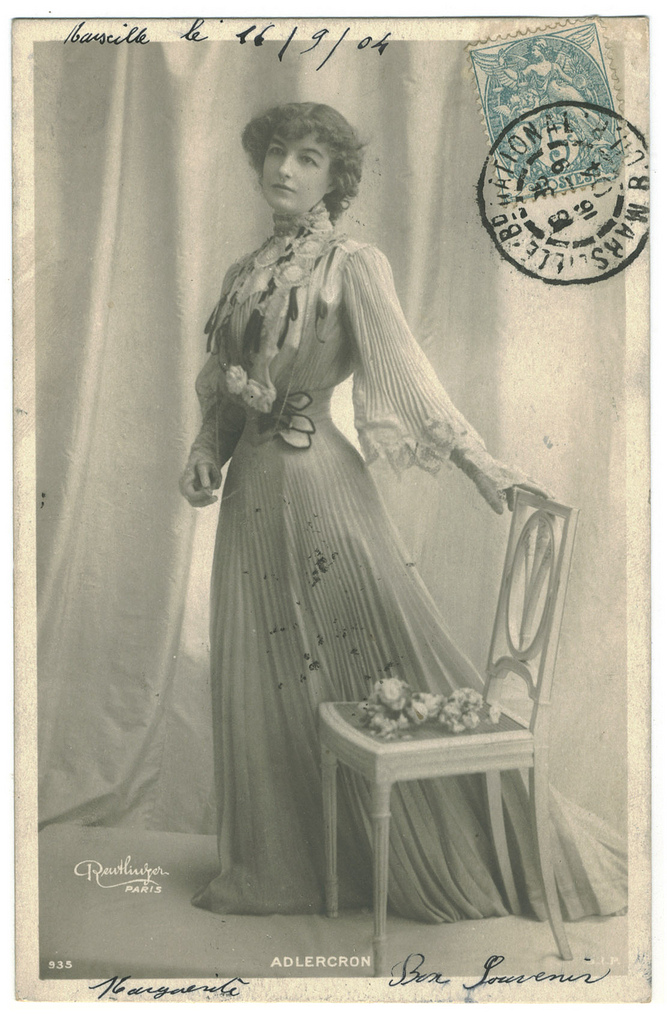
A photograph by Reutlinger sent as a postcard, 1904

Léopold-Émile Reutlinger (17 March 1863 – 16 March 1937) was a Peruvian-born French photographer.

He came from a successful German-Jewish family of photographers. His uncle, Charles Reutlinger, founded the family's photography business, and his father was the photographer Émile Reutlinger. His son, Jean Reutlinger, was also a prominent photographer.

== Life ==
Born in Callao, Peru, Reutlinger became a photographer like his uncle and his father. He lived in Callao until 1883 and then, at his father's insistence, entered the studio in Paris, which his father had been running alone since 1880. He took over the studio from his father after 1890.

Like his uncle, he took photographs of popular actresses and opera singers from the beginning. Soon, he also took fashion and advertising photos and photographed stars of the entertainment venues, including the Moulin Rouge and the Folies Bergère, both in Paris. The photographs were either sold to magazines and newspapers or reproduced as postcards.

Especially the business with pictures in postcard format, which were often clearly influenced by Art Nouveau, was successful. Some of the pictures were colored and designed as photomontages.

Reutlinger had an excellent reputation at age forty. He clearly trumped his uncle's success. He recorded, among others, the exotic dancer and spy Mata Hari, the dancer Cléo de Mérode, the stage actress Sarah Bernhardt, the stage actress Léonie Yahne, the stage performer Anna Held and the operatic soprano and actress Lina Cavalieri. Reutlinger was also one of the pioneers of erotic photography.

In 1891, his son, Jean, was born, who worked together with his father as a photographer from 1910. Jean died in 1914 in World War I.

In 1930, Reutlinger suffered an accident with a champagne cork, which cost him an eye and seriously affected his profession. But he continued to run the studio until his death in Paris in 1937.

== Gallery ==
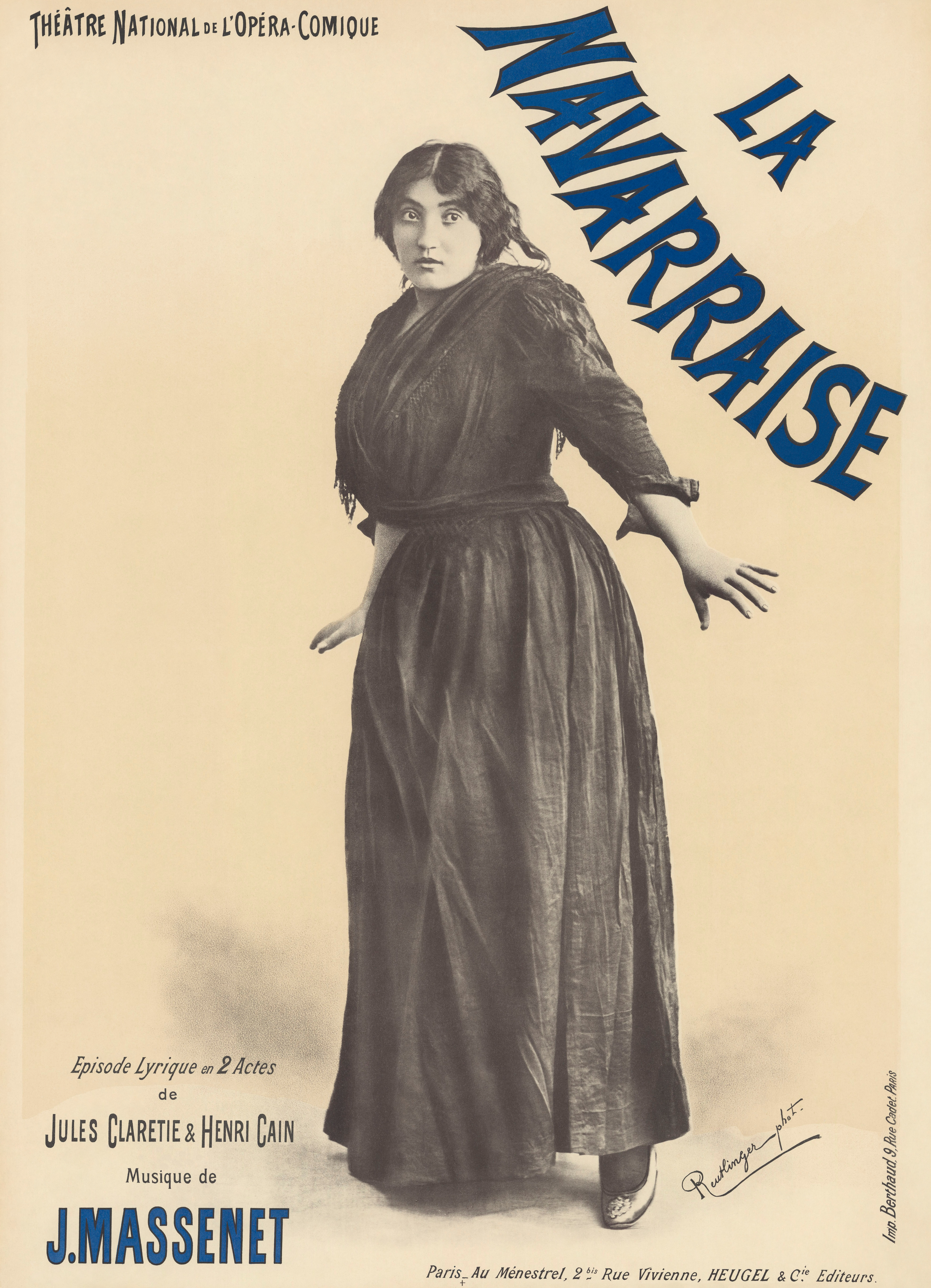
Poster for Jules Massenet's La Navarraise with Emma Calvé in the rôle of Anita, 1895

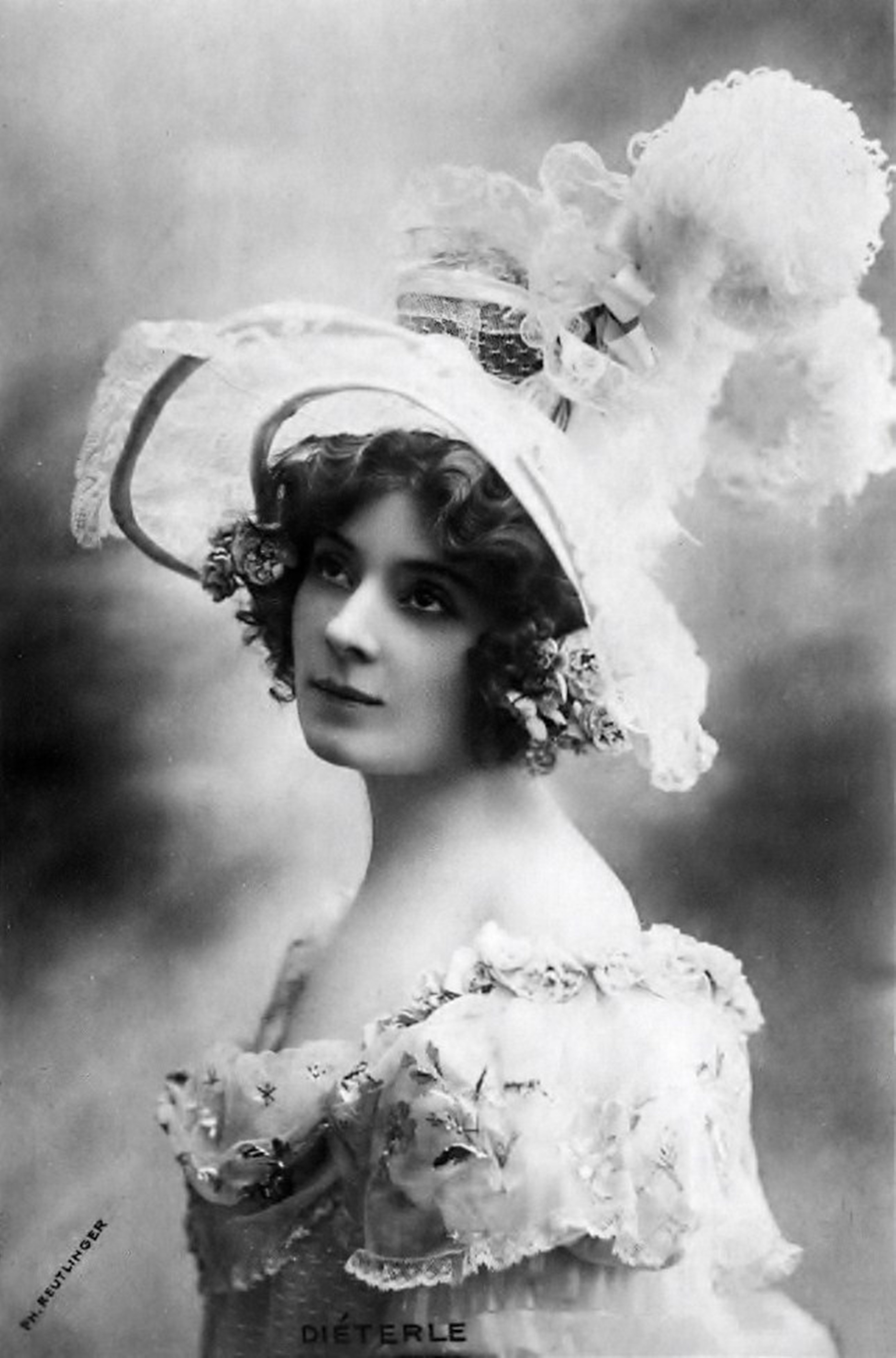
Amélie Diéterle photographed by Reutlinger circa 1900

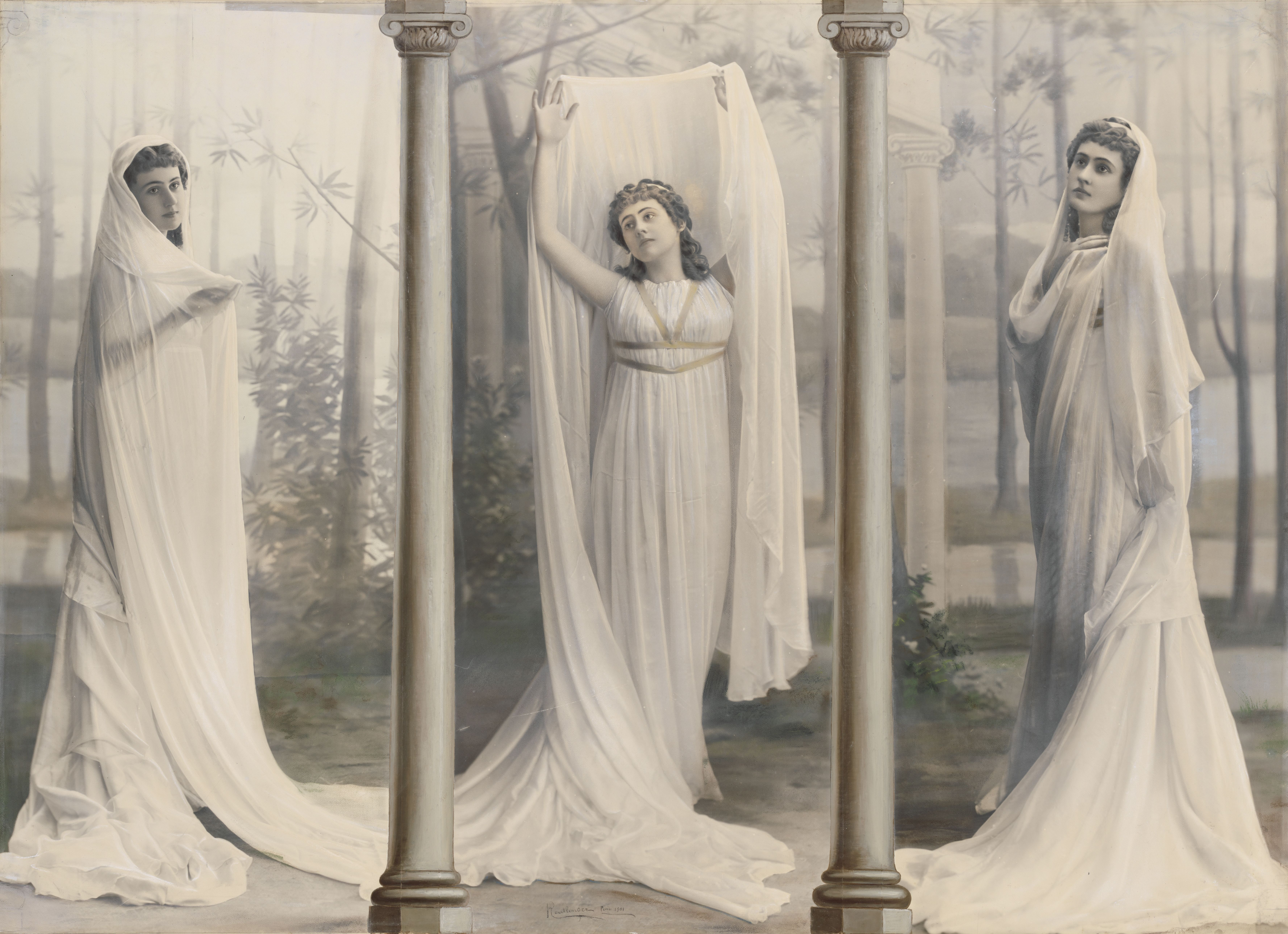
Aino Ackté in 1901

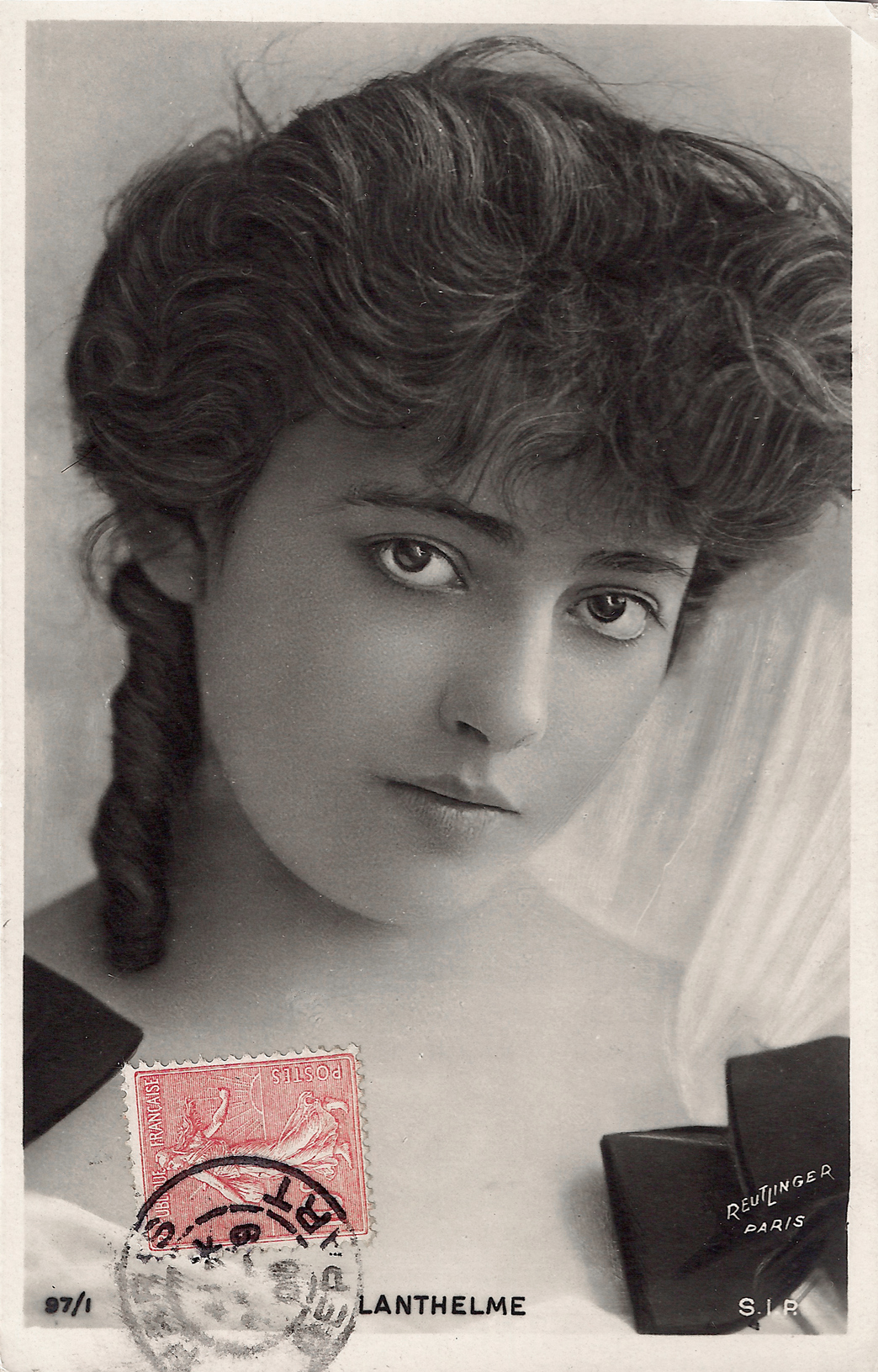
Postcard of Geneviève Lantelme, c. 1902

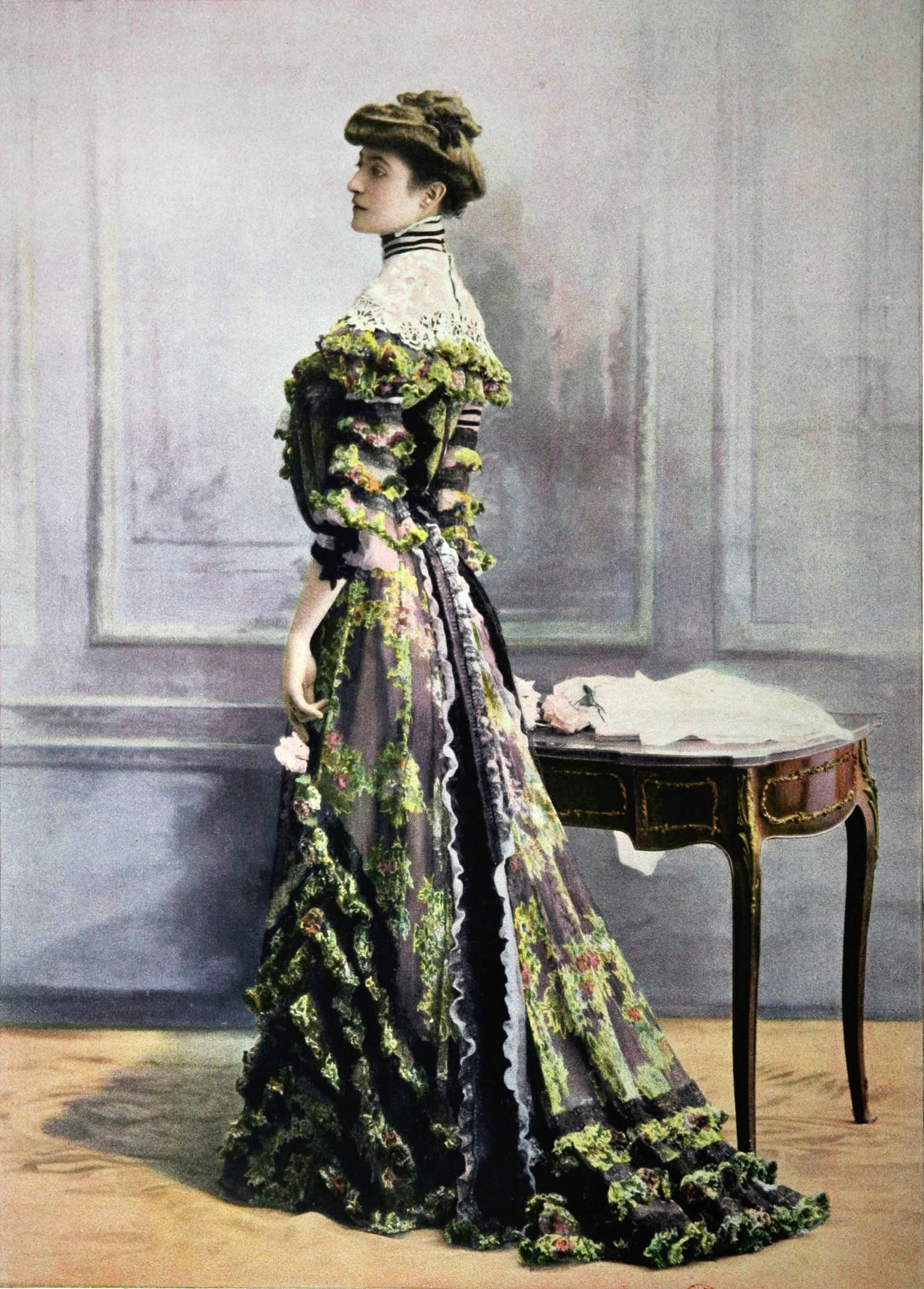
Hand-tinted photograph of a dress for a magazine, 1903

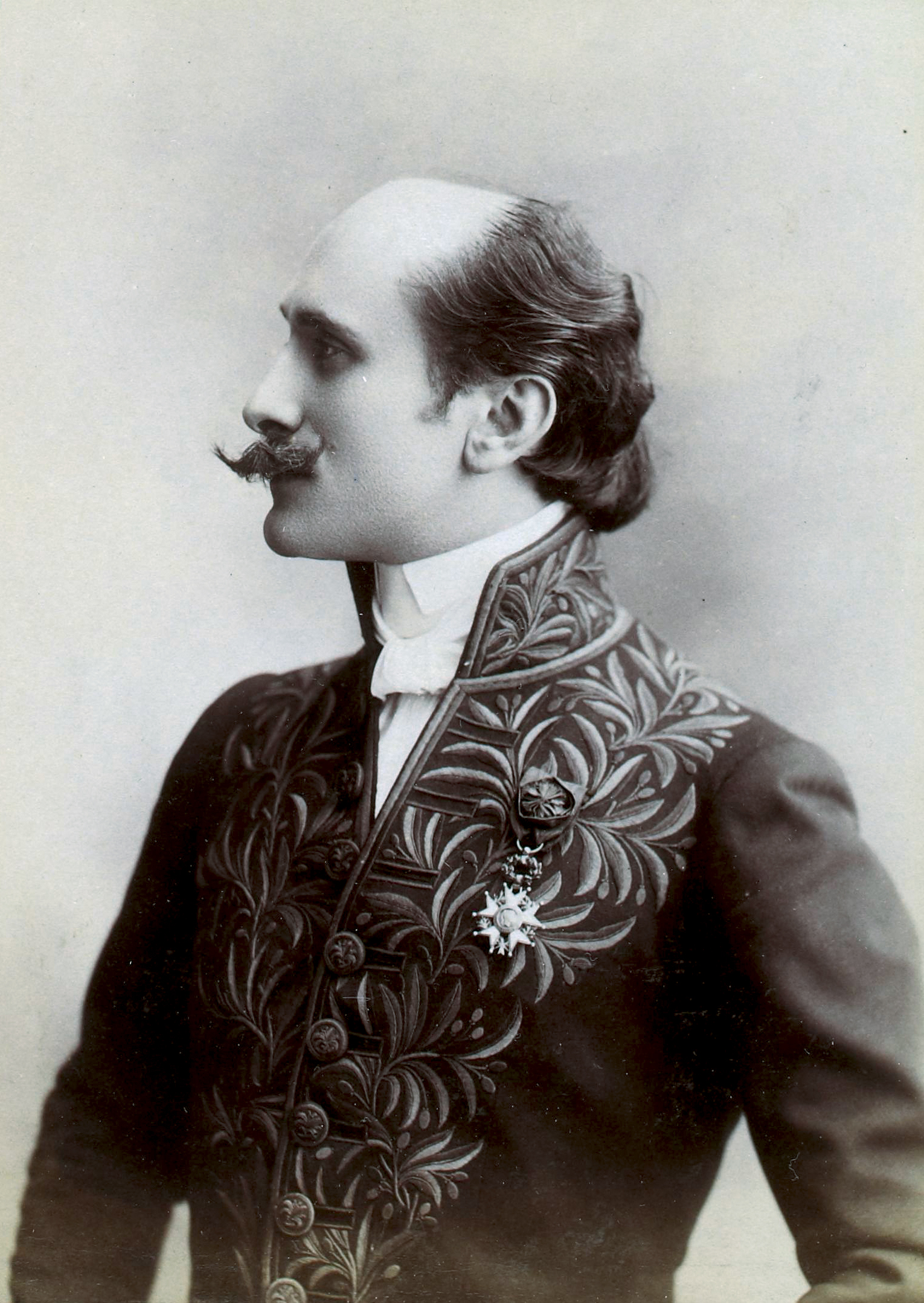
Edmond Rostand, 1903

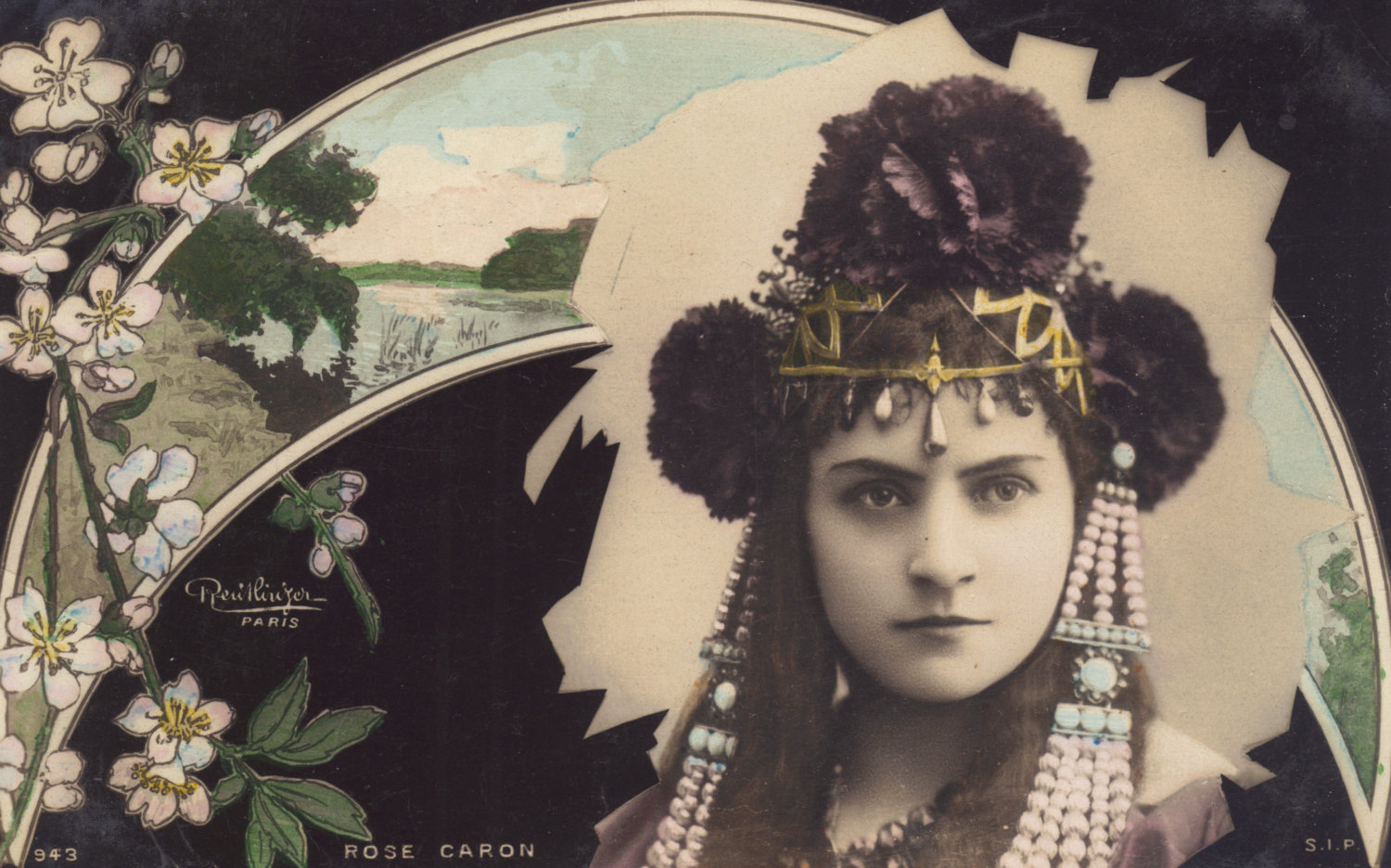
Rose Caron, c. 1905

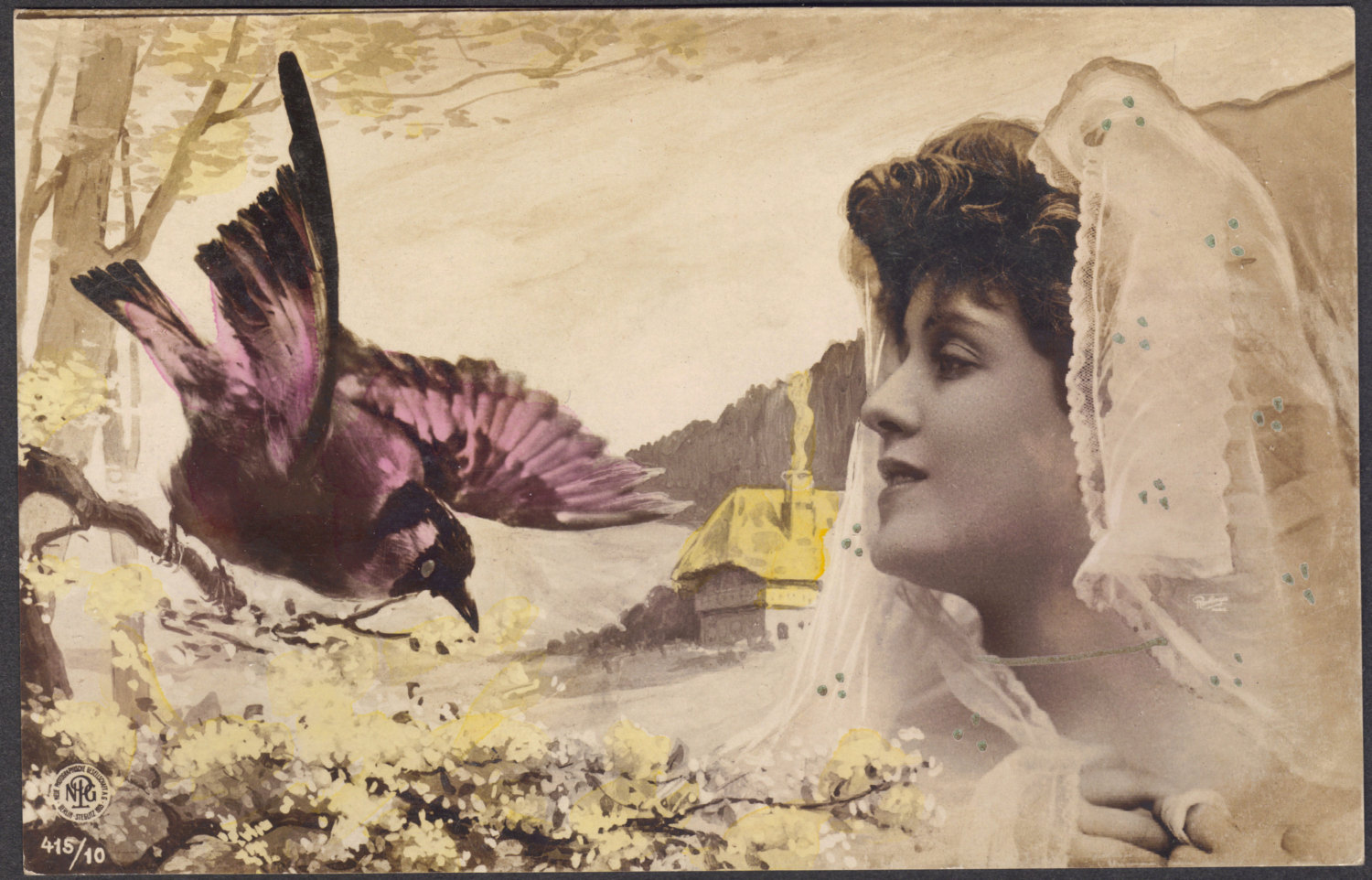
Marguerite Lucile Brésil, 1906

== Bibliography ==
- Lebeck, Robert – Leopold Reutlinger, 1979
- Bourgeron, Jean-Pierre – Les Reutlinger. Photographes à Paris 1850–1937, Grove Art: Paris, 1979, ISBN 2-903097-02-X
- Die Schonen von Paris: Fotografien aus der Belle Epoque, Leopold Reutlinger, 1981

== Video ==
- La Belle Otero sous l'objectif de Reutlinger (DVD), Édition du Compas, 2009, ISBN 978-2-35029-004-1
