= Marguerite Lucile Brésil =

French actress and model (1880–1961)

Marguerite Brésil
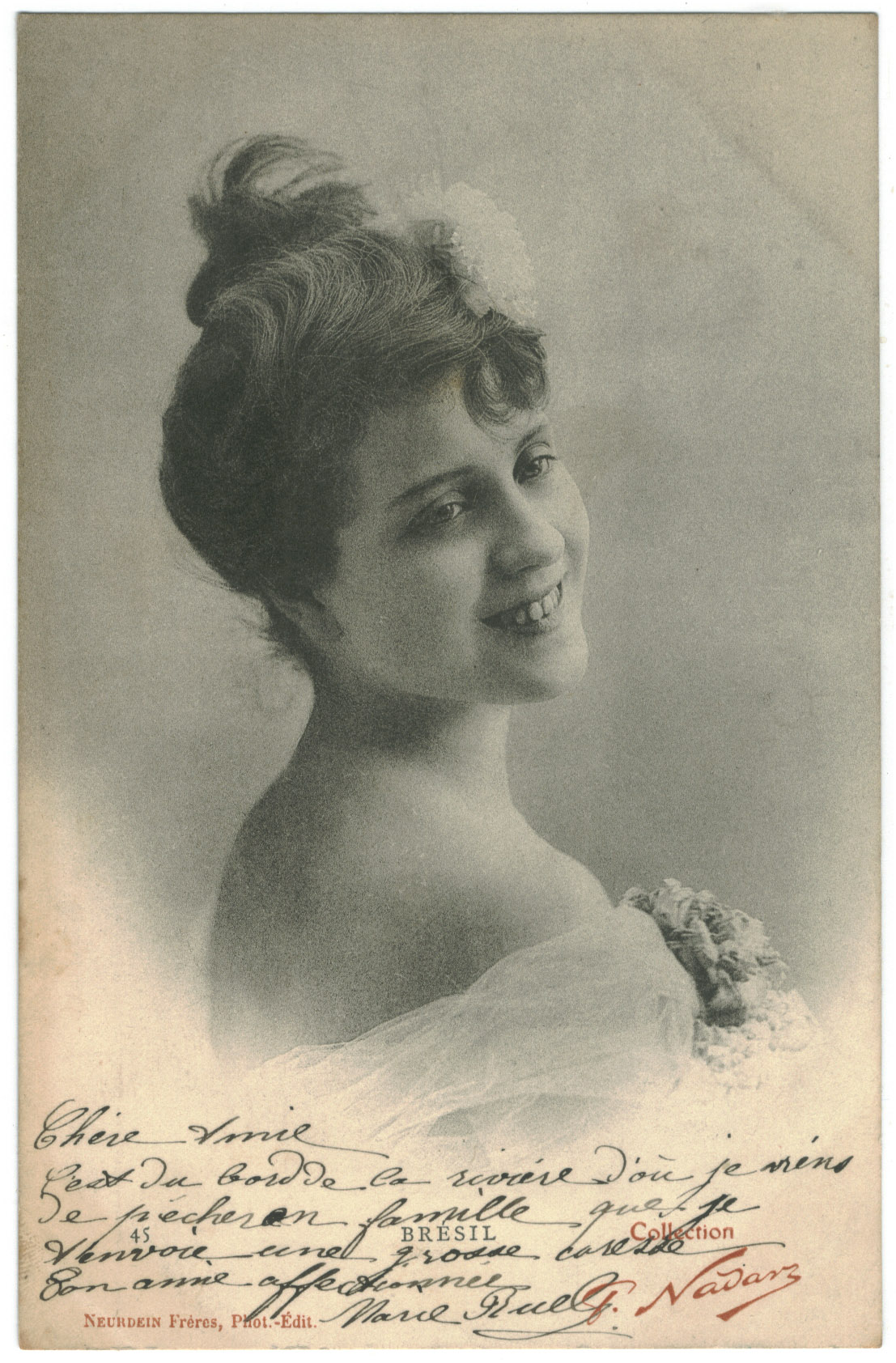
- Portrait of Marguerite Lucile Brésil by Paul Nadar
- Born: Marguerite Lucile Brésil; 19 August 1880; Sermaises, Loiret, France
- Died: 1 February 1961 (aged 80); Paris, 16th arrondissement of Paris France
- Resting place: Montparnasse Cemetery
- Other names: Marguerite Brésil; Marguerite Brezil
- Occupations: Actress; model; singer
- Years active: 1899 – 1912
- Spouse: Paul Joseph Clément Débard (m. 1924; died 1944)
- Parent(s): Léon Brésil (father); Marie Servin (mother)
- Relatives: Serge Brésil (brother); Jules Brésil (grandfather); Lucile Henriette Mondutaigny (grandmother)

Signature
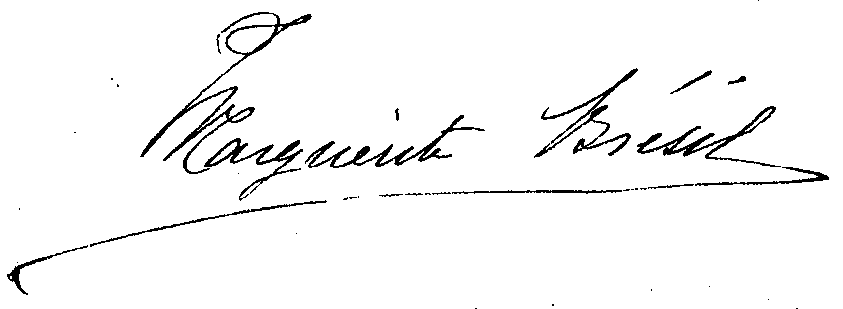

Marguerite Lucile Brésil (19 August 1880 – 1 February 1961) was a French stage and early silent film actress whose career spanned the height of the Belle Époque. She performed across major theatre venues in Paris and was a notable cultural and fashion figure of early 20th-century French society, modernly remembered for popularizing the classical Récamier hairstyle.

== Early life and education ==
Marguerite Lucile Brésil was born on August 19, 1880, in Sermaises in the Loiret department of France. Her family was embedded within the elite Parisian theatrical and journalistic spheres.

Marguerite's father Léon Brésil (1850–1919), was a well-known cultural journalist for the prestigious French daily newspaper Le Figaro and her grandfather Jules Brésil (1818–1899), was a playwright and theater actor. Marguerite's grandmother Lucile Henriette Mondutaigny (1826–1901), was an opera singer.

At Paris, she studied at the Conservatoire under MM. Worms and Delaunay. Growing up in an environment dominated by dramatic literature and press commentary, Brésil was introduced to theater production from a young age.

== Career ==
=== Theater ===
Brésil made her formal professional stage debut in Paris in 1899 starring in the production Petit Chagrin (Little Sorrow). Her performance gained the attention of contemporary directors, allowing her to transition to the prominent Théâtre des Variétés by 1901.

Over the next decade, she established herself as a versatile lead actress in revues, romantic comedies, and classic dramas. Critical reviews tracked by Le Figaro and Le Gaulois routinely praised her stage presence, noting her playful charm (charme enjoué) and her high marketability across different companies.

One of her career-defining theatrical milestones came when she was cast in a high-profile revival of Zaza, the popular play by Pierre Berton and Charles Simon. Taking over the complex, emotionally taxing title role—originally debuted at the Théâtre du Vaudeville—cemented her standing as a leading dramatic actress.

=== Silent film (1908–1912) ===
As the early French cinematic industry began to rapidly expand under studios like Pathé Frères, Brésil transitioned into screen acting. She collaborated with French directors such as Albert Capellani and Georges Monca.

In 1908, she made her debut in L'Homme aux gants blancs (The Man with White Gloves / A Pair of White Gloves), directed by Albert Capellani, where she played a notable courtesan. Later in 1909, she appeared in lead role in film Elle est partie, directed by Georges Monca. Later she did a lead role in L'Infidélité d'Ernest, portraying the character Pamela in 1910. In 1911, she worked in La Dévouement de la postière.

=== Retirement and later life ===
Following her retirement from the stage and acting, Brésil lived a relatively quiet life in Paris.

== Personal life ==
She married Paul Joseph Clément Débard a Parisian metallurgical founder in 1924 after she retired from acting.

== Death ==
She died on February 1, 1961, at the age of 80 in the wealthy 16th arrondissement of Paris. She is buried in the Montparnasse Cemetery (7th Division).

== Filmography ==
=== Film ===
| Year | Title | Role | Notes |
|---|---|---|---|
| 1908 | L'Homme aux gants blancs | Courtesan | Debut |
| 1909 | Elle est partie | Lady | Directed by Georges Monca |
| 1910 | L'Infidélité d'Ernest | Pamela | |
| 1911 | La Dévouement de la postière | Marie | |

=== Stage ===
| Year | Title | Role(s) | Venue(s) | Notes |
|---|---|---|---|---|
| 1899 | Petit Chagrin | Lucie Renouard | Théâtre des Variétés | Debut |
| 1900 | Les femmes de paille | Lucienne | Théâtre du Palais-Royal | |
| 1901 | La Revue des Variétés | Bella | Théâtre des Variétés | |
| 1903 | Paris aux Variétés | Veronica | Théâtre des Variétés | |
| 1904 | La Dame du numéro 23 | Patricia | Théâtre des Nouveautés | |
| 1904 | La Baronne Pasquier | Baroness Pasquier | Théâtre Sarah-Bernhardt | |
| 1906 | Nono by Sacha Guitry | Nina d'Œillet | Théâtre de l'Odéon | |
| 1908 | La Conquête des fleurs | Queen of Roses | Théâtre de l'Athénée | |
| 1908 | La Patronne | Adrienne | Théâtre du Vaudeville | |
| 1909 | Zaza | Juliet | Théâtre Michel | |

== Cultural legacy and fashion impact ==
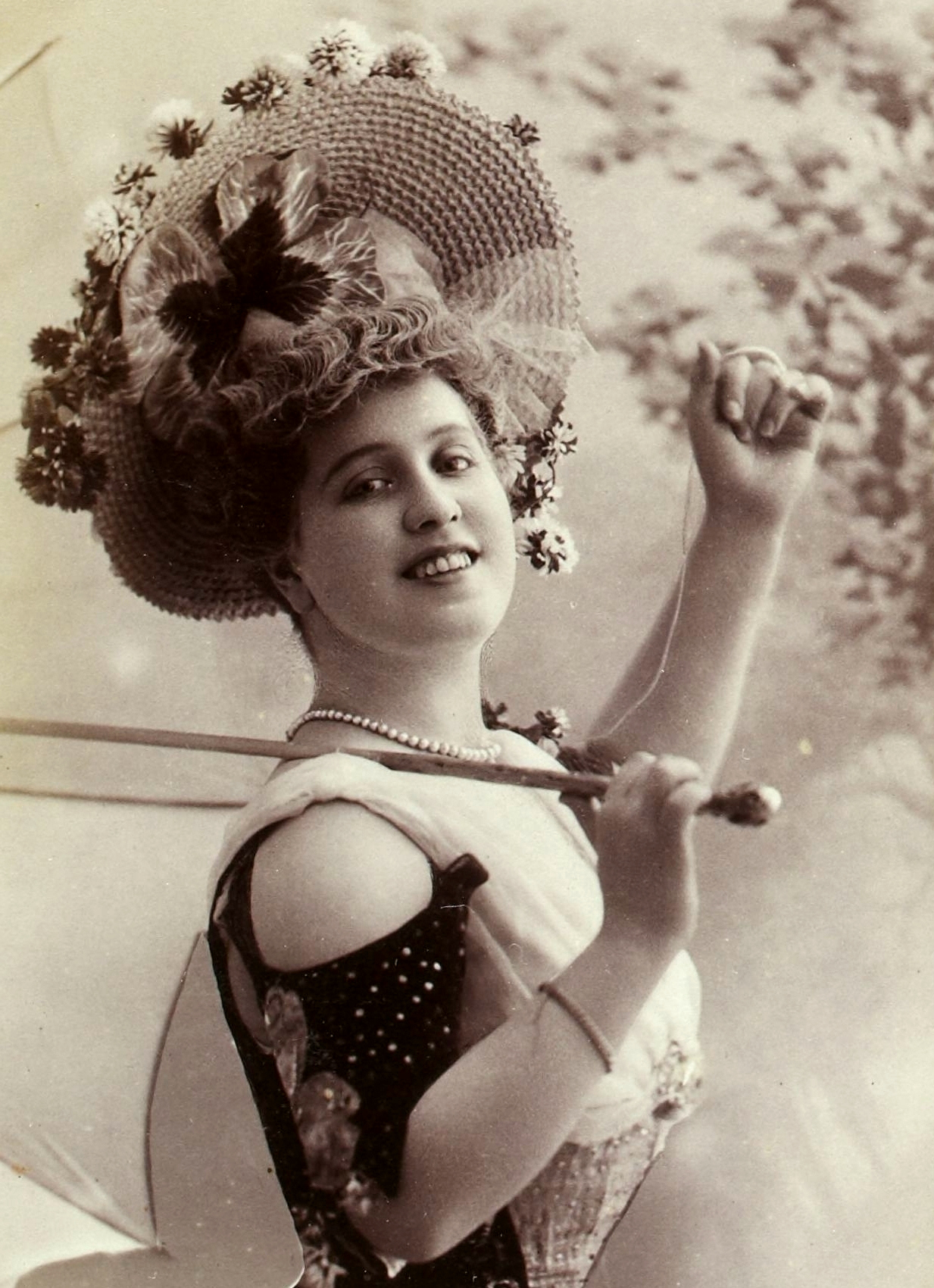
Photo of Marguerite Lucile Brésil by Jean Reutlinger.

Brésil's impact extended far beyond the stage door. During the Belle Époque, she was widely recognized as a Parisian style icon.

== The Récamier hairstyle ==
Brésil is historically credited with popularizing the widespread resurgence of the Récamier hairstyle during the early 1900s. Inspired by the Napoleonic-era socialite Juliette Récamier, the look consisted of an elegant, high updo anchored with cascading, loose ringlets framing the face.

== Archival photography ==
She was a favorite subject for the era's elite celebrity portraitists. Sessions with studios like Paul Nadar and Emile Auguste Reutlinger yielded iconic imagery. Her portraits were mass-produced on real-photo postcards—a major collectible medium of the time—and featured in the luxury theater magazine Le Théâtre, which documented high-society fashion. The French National Library (BnF Data) preserves 51 distinct archival collections of her photography and stage renderings.
