= François Louis de Salignac =

French soldier and playwright

François-Louis de Salignac, marquis de La Mothe-Fénelon

Governor of Martinique
- In office July 1763 – April 1764
- Preceded by: William Rufane
- Succeeded by: Victor-Thérèse Charpentier

Personal details
- Born: 7 November 1722
- Died: 10 October 1767 (aged 44) Aschères-le-Marché, Loiret, France
- Occupation: Soldier, playwright

François-Louis de Salignac de La Mothe-Fénelon, marquis de La Mothe-Fénelon (7 November 1722 – 10 October 1767) was a French soldier and playwright who was governor of Martinique from 1763 to 1764.

== Family ==
François-Louis de Salignac de La Mothe-Fénelon was born on 7 November 1722. His paternal family was descended from Antoine de Neuville, baron of Magnac in Manche in the 16th century, whose sole granddaughter married Francois de Salignac or Salangac, Baron of Motte-Fénelon, in 1599. His father was Gabriel Jacques de Salignac de La Mothe-Fénelon (1688–1746), Marquis of Mothe-Fénelon, an army lieutenant general and ambassador to the Hague. His father died of wounds received in the battle of Rocoux. His mother was Françoise Louise Le Pelletier de Montméliand (died 1782).

== Career ==
In 1737 Fénelon was a second lieutenant in the King's Infantry Regiment at the age of 15. He was made a knight of the Order of Saint Louis in 1740. He was attached to the gendarmes of Berry in 1740, and was a lieutenant-colonel of cavalry in 1741. In 1745 he was colonel of the Régiment de La Fère. In 1747 Fénelon was a brigadier of the infantry. On 29 October 1747 Fénelon married Marie Charlotte Malon de Bercy (died 1760). Their children were Louis François Charles (1750–1803), Jean Louis Augustin (1753–1829) and Louise Charlotte (1758–1840). He was a maréchal de camp in 1759, lieutenant general in 1762 and governor of Martinique in 1763.

He was also Lieutenant General of the Windward Islands. In addition to his capacity as imperial official, Fénelon upheld the slave system ideologically through his white supremacist writings, stating that

The safety of the whites demands that the blacks be kept in the most profound ignorance. I have come to believe firmly that the blacks must be managed like beasts.

He died at the age of 44 on 10 October 1767 in Aschères-le-Marché, Loiret, France.

== Publications ==
Fénelon was also a playwright. His publications include:

- M. de Fen... [Fénelon.] (1754), Alexandre, tragédie nouvelle en 5 actes, Paris: Prault fils, p. 57
- Bremond, Henri; Fénelon, François-Louis de Salignac de La Mothe (1930), Les Plus belles pages de Fénelon, Paris: Flammarion

== Sources ==
- Expilly, Jean-Joseph (1766), Dictionnaire Géographique, Historique Et Politique Des Gaules Et De La France: L - M. 4 (in French), Desaint & Saillant
- François-Louis de Salignac de La Mothe Fénelon (1722-1764) (in French), BnF – Bibliotheque nationale de France
- Mazas, Alexandre; Anne, Théodore (1860), Histoire de L'ordre royal et militaire de Saint-Louis ... jusqu'en 1830, terminée per T. Anne (in French)
- "Morts", Mercure de France: 1767, 12 (in French), 1767
- Wailly, Guillaume, "François Louis de SALIGNAC de La MOTHE FÉNELON", Geneanet (in French)
