= Guigneville =

- Commune
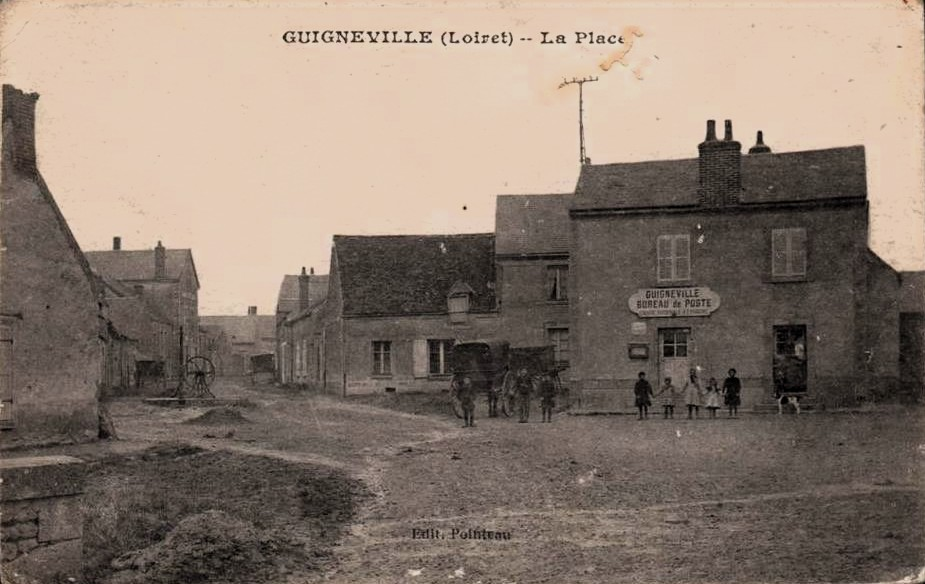
- An old postcard view of Guigneville
- Location of Guigneville
- Location within France Location within Centre-Val de Loire
- Coordinates: 48°12′25″N 2°10′41″E
- Country: France
- Region: Centre-Val de Loire
- Department: Loiret
- Arrondissement: Pithiviers
- Canton: Pithiviers
- Intercommunality: Pithiverais

Government
  - Mayor (2020–2026): Jérémie Amiard
- Area^{1}: 32.01 km^{2} (12.36 sq mi)
- Highest elevation: 141 m (463 ft)
- Lowest elevation: 117 m (384 ft)
- Population (2023): 540
  - Density: 17/km^{2} (44/sq mi)
- Demonym: Guignevillois
- Time zone: UTC+01:00 (CET)
  - Summer (DST): UTC+02:00 (CEST)
- INSEE/Postal code: 45162 /45300
- ^{1} French Land Register data, which excludes lakes, ponds, glaciers > 1 km^{2} (0.386 sq mi or 247 acres) and river estuaries.

Guigneville (French pronunciation: [ɡiɲvil]) is a commune in the Loiret department in north-central France.

== Geography ==
The commune is in the north of the department, in the Beauce, large cereal area with a gentle slope. It is located 7 km northwest of Pithiviers, and 40 km northeast of Orléans. The departmental roads 22, 23 et 134 cross the territory of the commune.

== Heritage ==
Saint-Hilaire church was built in several stages between the 12th and 16th century. It is a listed historic monument since 6 March 1928. It is holding a copy of a 17th century painting by Jean Jouvenet representing the Visitation of the Virgin created for the choir of the cathedral Notre-Dame de Paris. This copy was originally created for the Abbey of Saint-Benoît-sur-Loire, and was classified as a historic object on 5 December 1908.

== See also ==
- Communes of the Loiret department
