= Jean-Antoine Verdier =

French general

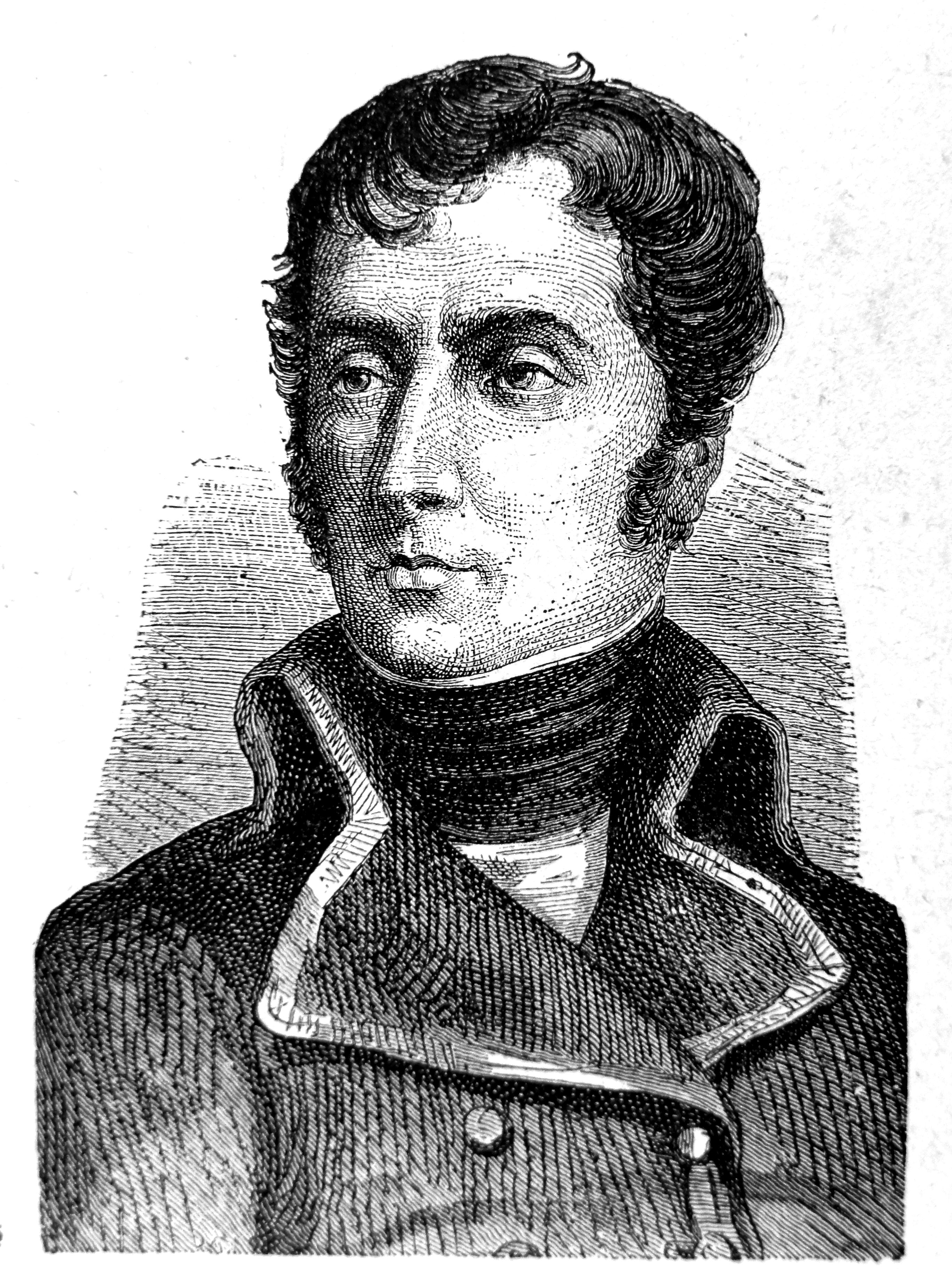
- Général Jean Antoine Verdier
- Born: 2 May 1767; Toulouse
- Died: 1839 (aged 71–72); Mâcon
- Military career
- Allegiance: Kingdom of France; France
- Branch: French Army
- Service years: 1785–1817
- Rank: General
- Conflicts: French Revolutionary Wars; War of the First Coalition (WIA); Egyptian Campaign (WIA); Napoleonic Wars; War of the Fourth Coalition; Peninsular War; Russian Campaign (WIA); War of the Sixth Coalition
- Awards: Sabre of Honour; Order of Saint Louis; Légion d'honneur; Order of the Iron Crown; Peerage of France

Jean-Antoine Verdier (French pronunciation: [ʒɑ̃.n‿ɑ̃twan vɛʁdje]; 2 May 1767 – 30 May 1839) was a French General during the Revolutionary and Napoleonic Wars.

== Service ==
Born in Toulouse, he enlisted into the Régiment de la Fère on 18 February 1785. He served as Aide-de-camp to Augereau in 1792 with the army of the Eastern Pyrenees.

=== Spain ===
In 1793, during the war with Spain, Verdier, with only a battalion of tirailleurs, captured a redoubt outside Figueres defended by 4,000 Spanish troops and 80 guns, gaining promotion from Captain to Adjutant-General. He was promoted to Brigadier in 1795, and the following year in Italy, at the head of three Grenadier battalions, captured the hill called Monte Medolano. He was made General of Brigade on the battlefield of Castiglione, was wounded at Arcole, and fought on until the end of the war of the First Coalition.

=== Egypt ===
In Egypt, he commanded a brigade in Kléber's division at the Battle of the Pyramids. At the siege of Acre, he was wounded by a bayonet thrust. On 1 November 1799, with only 1,000 men, Verdier attacked 8,000 Janissaries who had landed close to Damiette. He killed 3,000, took 800 prisoners, and captured 5 guns and 32 standards. Kléber presented him with the Sabre of Honour and promoted him to Divisional General.

=== Europe ===
After returning to France, Verdier was employed under Joachim Murat for a time in the Cisalpine Republic, then placed in charge of the troops of Etruria. As the campaigns got underway in 1805, Verdier took command of a division of the Army of Italy under Marshal André Masséna. During this campaign he was wounded in the crossing of the Adige, and then became commander at Livorno. In February 1806, Verdier was transferred to the Army of Naples where he took command of a division of Reynier's corps. He led this division into the fighting at Campo Tenese, and in July evacuated Cosenza.

In March 1807, Verdier left Italy to join Grande Armée, and in May he took command of the 2nd Division of the Reserve Corps under Jean Lannes. After taking part in the fierce fighting of Heilsberg and Friedland, he was rewarded the next year with two honors: Count of the Empire, and Commander of the Iron Crown.

Spain was the next campaign for Verdier, and in March 1808 he took command of the 2nd Division of Bessières' corps. After winning at Logrono in June, he was chosen to replace Savary as commander of Aragon and Navarre. Upon taking charge of the siege of Saragossa, Verdier was wounded and then later lifted the siege. In November he was to join Soult's corps, but instead was directed to command the province of Bilbao. Replacing Reille as commander of a German division, Verdier then took up the siege of Girona in March 1809, and in December he accepted the city's surrender. The month before returning to France in April 1810, Verdier distinguished himself in the fighting around Arenys de Mar.

For the next few years, Verdier commanded a division in a corps of observation, which later became Oudinot's II Corps for the Russian campaign. In Russia, he fought at Jaboukowo, Khastitzi, Polotsk, and Swolna, and then at the second battle of Polotsk he was badly wounded. Due to his awful wounds, he was sent back to France and avoided the horrors of the retreat.

By May 1813 Verdier was fit enough for duty, and took command of the 4th Infantry Division of the Corps of Observation at the Adige. That September he took command of a corps under Prince Eugene consisting of Rouyer's and Gratien's divisions in the Army of Italy, and was then placed under Paul Grenier. He was wounded by a shot in the combat of Ala in November, but it was not bad enough to put him out of action. In 1814 he took command of a corps consisting of the divisions commanded by Quesnel, Fressinet, and Palombini. In February he fought at the battle of the Mincio and at Borghetto, then in June he returned to France, only to be put on non-activity. However, he was rewarded with a Grand Cross of the Legion of Honor in January 1815.

For the Hundred Days, Verdier commanded the 17th Infantry Division of Brune's IX Corps, and was made a Peer of France. He also commanded the 8th Military District (Marseille). In the chaos after the Waterloo, he prevented Toulon from being plundered. Shortly after Napoleon's abdication, he retired.

== Honors ==
Upon the first restoration of King Louis XVIII, Verdier was retired, but was awarded the Cross of Saint-Louis. On 17 January 1815, he was decorated with the Grand Cross of the Legion of Honour. He had already been made Commander of the Iron Crown by Napoleon.

The ordinance of 1 August 1817 obliged him to retire once again. Though he was briefly reactivated in the reserves in 1830, he soon retired for good.

While on active service, Verdier's wife was widely admired for accompanying her husband in the field.
