= Villereau =

Villereau is the name of the following communes in France:

- Villereau, Loiret, in the Loiret department
- Villereau, Nord, in the Nord department
