= Greneville-en-Beauce =

- Commune
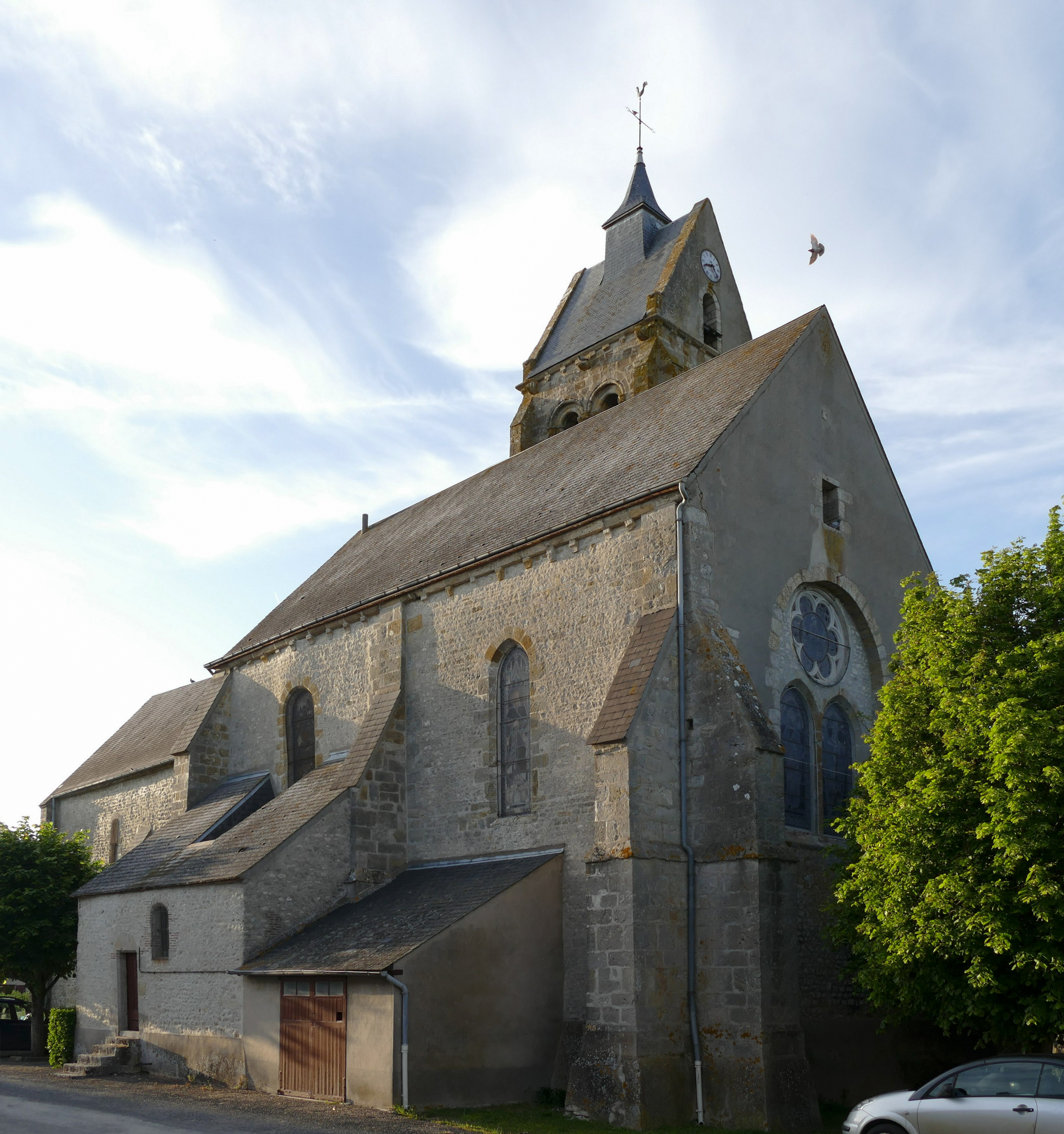
- Saint-Félix's church

- Coat of arms
- Location of Greneville-en-Beauce
- Location within France Location within Centre-Val de Loire
- Coordinates: 48°10′57″N 2°06′49″E
- Country: France
- Region: Centre-Val de Loire
- Department: Loiret
- Arrondissement: Pithiviers
- Canton: Pithiviers
- Intercommunality: CC de la Plaine du Nord Loiret

Government
  - Mayor (2020–2026): Jean-Louis Brisson
- Area^{1}: 22.47 km^{2} (8.68 sq mi)
- Highest elevation: 137 m (449 ft)
- Lowest elevation: 114 m (374 ft)
- Population (2023): 654
  - Density: 29.1/km^{2} (75.4/sq mi)
- Demonym: Grenevillois
- Time zone: UTC+01:00 (CET)
  - Summer (DST): UTC+02:00 (CEST)
- INSEE/Postal code: 45160 /45480
- ^{1} French Land Register data, which excludes lakes, ponds, glaciers > 1 km^{2} (0.386 sq mi or 247 acres) and river estuaries.

Greneville-en-Beauce (French pronunciation: [ɡʁœnvil ɑ̃ bos], literally Greneville in Beauce) is a commune in the Loiret department in north-central France. In 1973 it absorbed the former commune Guignonville.

== See also ==
- Communes of the Loiret department
