= Charmont-en-Beauce =

- Commune
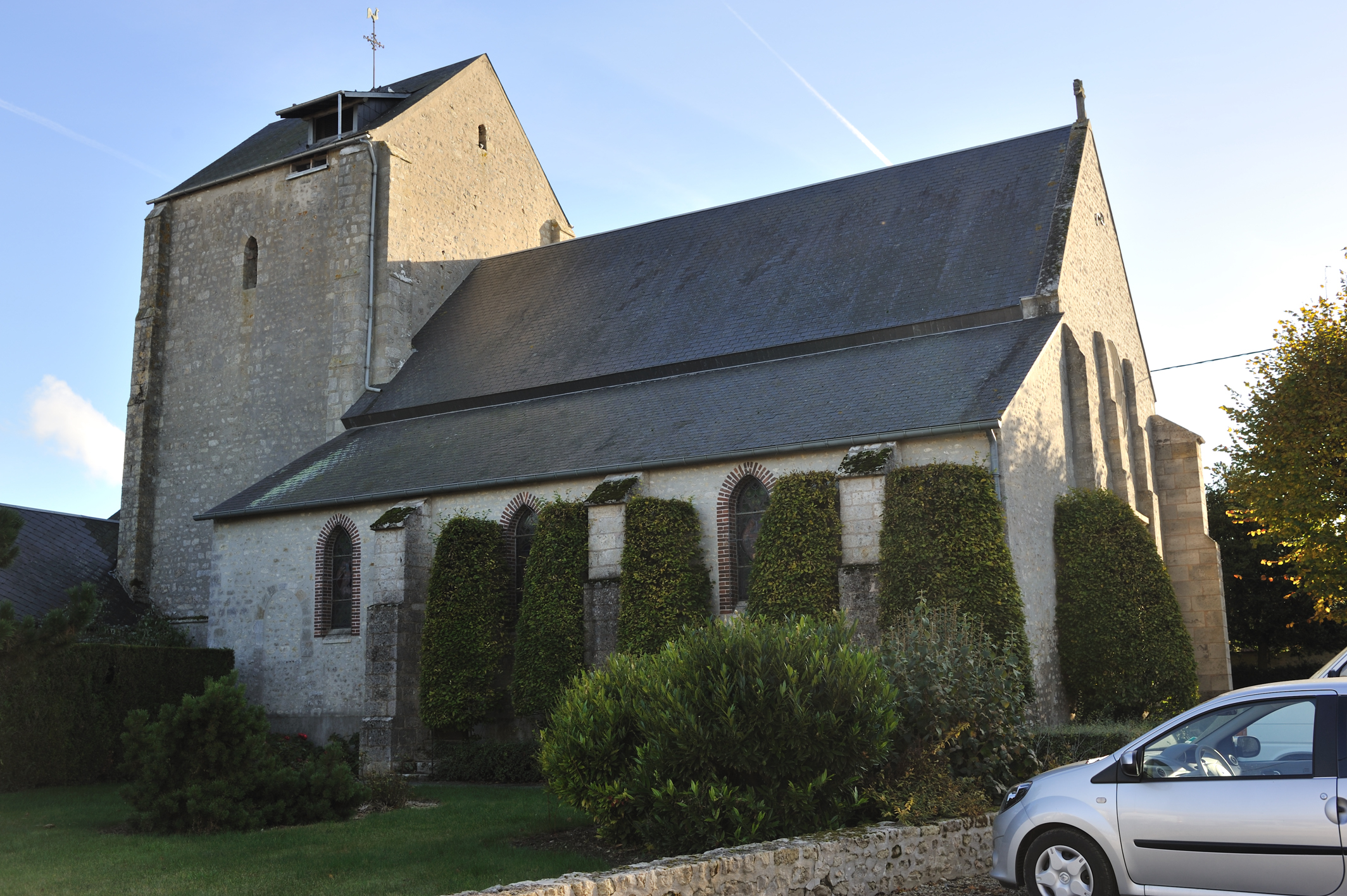
- The church in Charmont-en-Beauce
- Location of Charmont-en-Beauce
- Location within France Location within Centre-Val de Loire
- Coordinates: 48°13′58″N 2°06′23″E
- Country: France
- Region: Centre-Val de Loire
- Department: Loiret
- Arrondissement: Pithiviers
- Canton: Pithiviers
- Intercommunality: CC Plaine du Nord Loiret

Government
  - Mayor (2020–2026): Delphine Prunet
- Area^{1}: 18.05 km^{2} (6.97 sq mi)
- Highest elevation: 134 m (440 ft)
- Lowest elevation: 106 m (348 ft)
- Population (2023): 336
  - Density: 18.6/km^{2} (48.2/sq mi)
- Demonym: Charmontois
- Time zone: UTC+01:00 (CET)
  - Summer (DST): UTC+02:00 (CEST)
- INSEE/Postal code: 45080 /45480
- ^{1} French Land Register data, which excludes lakes, ponds, glaciers > 1 km^{2} (0.386 sq mi or 247 acres) and river estuaries.

Charmont-en-Beauce (French pronunciation: [ʃaʁmɔ̃ ɑ̃ bos], literally Charmont on Beauce) is a commune in the Loiret department in north-central France.

== See also ==
- Communes of the Loiret department
