= Chaussy =

Chaussy may refer to:

- An alternate name of Chavusy, a district town in Mahilyow Province, Belarus

Chaussy is the name of several communes in France:

- Chaussy, in the Loiret département
- Chaussy, in the Val-d'Oise département
