= Rouvres =

Rouvres may refer to several communes in France:

- Rouvres, Calvados, in the Calvados département
- Rouvres, Eure-et-Loir, in the Eure-et-Loir département
- Rouvres, Seine-et-Marne, in the Seine-et-Marne département
- Rouvres-en-Multien, in the Oise département
- Rouvres-en-Plaine, in the Côte-d'Or département
- Rouvres-en-Woëvre, in the Meuse département
- Rouvres-en-Xaintois, in the Vosges département
- Rouvres-la-Chétive, in the Vosges département
- Rouvres-les-Bois, in the Indre département
- Rouvres-les-Vignes, in the Aube département
- Rouvres-Saint-Jean, in the Loiret département
- Rouvres-sous-Meilly, in the Côte-d'Or département
- Rouvres-sur-Aube, in the Haute-Marne département
