= Morville-en-Beauce =

- Commune
- Location of Morville-en-Beauce
- Location within France Location within Centre-Val de Loire
- Coordinates: 48°15′02″N 2°10′24″E
- Country: France
- Region: Centre-Val de Loire
- Department: Loiret
- Arrondissement: Pithiviers
- Canton: Pithiviers
- Intercommunality: Pithiverais

Government
  - Mayor (2020–2026): Georges Jeanne
- Area^{1}: 11.02 km^{2} (4.25 sq mi)
- Highest elevation: 134 m (440 ft)
- Lowest elevation: 115 m (377 ft)
- Population (2023): 175
  - Density: 15.9/km^{2} (41.1/sq mi)
- Time zone: UTC+01:00 (CET)
  - Summer (DST): UTC+02:00 (CEST)
- INSEE/Postal code: 45217 /45300
- ^{1} French Land Register data, which excludes lakes, ponds, glaciers > 1 km^{2} (0.386 sq mi or 247 acres) and river estuaries.

Morville-en-Beauce (French pronunciation: [mɔʁvil ɑ̃ bos], literally Morville in Beauce) is a commune in the Loiret department in north-central France. It is located about 12 km north of Pithiviers.

== See also ==
- Communes of the Loiret department
