= Jouy-en-Pithiverais =

- Commune
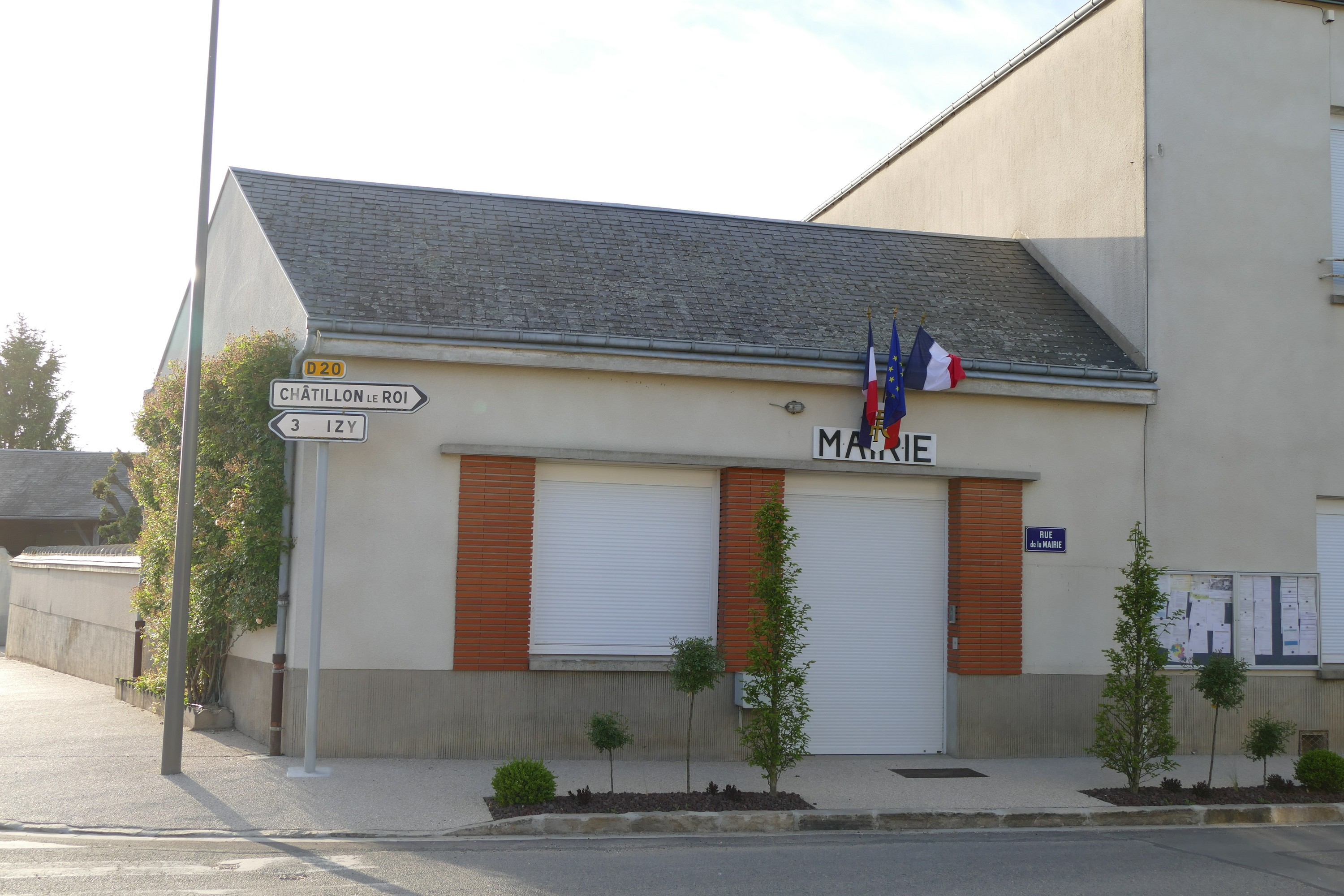
- Jouy-en-Pithiverais Town Hall

- Coat of arms
- Location of Jouy-en-Pithiverais
- Location within France Location within Centre-Val de Loire
- Coordinates: 48°08′32″N 2°06′50″E
- Country: France
- Region: Centre-Val de Loire
- Department: Loiret
- Arrondissement: Pithiviers
- Canton: Pithiviers
- Intercommunality: CC Plaine du Nord Loiret

Government
  - Mayor (2020–2026): Martial Bourgeois
- Area^{1}: 15.86 km^{2} (6.12 sq mi)
- Highest elevation: 137 m (449 ft)
- Lowest elevation: 109 m (358 ft)
- Population (2023): 263
  - Density: 16.6/km^{2} (42.9/sq mi)
- Demonym: Joviciens
- Time zone: UTC+01:00 (CET)
  - Summer (DST): UTC+02:00 (CEST)
- INSEE/Postal code: 45174 /45480
- ^{1} French Land Register data, which excludes lakes, ponds, glaciers > 1 km^{2} (0.386 sq mi or 247 acres) and river estuaries.

Jouy-en-Pithiverais is a commune in the Loiret department in north-central France.

== See also ==
- Communes of the Loiret department
