= Canton of Pithiviers =

Coordinates: 48.17°N 2.25°E

The canton of Pithiviers is an administrative division of the Loiret department, central France. Its borders were modified at the French canton reorganisation which came into effect in March 2015. Its seat is in Pithiviers.

It consists of the following communes:

1. Andonville
2. Aschères-le-Marché
3. Attray
4. Audeville
5. Autruy-sur-Juine
6. Bazoches-les-Gallerandes
7. Boisseaux
8. Bougy-lez-Neuville
9. Césarville-Dossainville
10. Charmont-en-Beauce
11. Châtillon-le-Roi
12. Chaussy
13. Crottes-en-Pithiverais
14. Dadonville
15. Engenville
16. Erceville
17. Greneville-en-Beauce
18. Guigneville
19. Intville-la-Guétard
20. Jouy-en-Pithiverais
21. Léouville
22. Montigny
23. Morville-en-Beauce
24. Neuville-aux-Bois
25. Oison
26. Outarville
27. Pannecières
28. Pithiviers
29. Pithiviers-le-Vieil
30. Rouvres-Saint-Jean
31. Saint-Lyé-la-Forêt
32. Sermaises
33. Thignonville
34. Tivernon
35. Villereau
