= Césarville-Dossainville =

- Commune
- Location of Césarville-Dossainville
- Location within France Location within Centre-Val de Loire
- Coordinates: 48°15′43″N 2°16′38″E
- Country: France
- Region: Centre-Val de Loire
- Department: Loiret
- Arrondissement: Pithiviers
- Canton: Pithiviers
- Intercommunality: Pithiverais

Government
  - Mayor (2020–2026): Olivier Herve
- Area^{1}: 19.06 km^{2} (7.36 sq mi)
- Highest elevation: 142 m (466 ft)
- Lowest elevation: 106 m (348 ft)
- Population (2023): 217
  - Density: 11.4/km^{2} (29.5/sq mi)
- Time zone: UTC+01:00 (CET)
  - Summer (DST): UTC+02:00 (CEST)
- INSEE/Postal code: 45065 /45300
- ^{1} French Land Register data, which excludes lakes, ponds, glaciers > 1 km^{2} (0.386 sq mi or 247 acres) and river estuaries.

Césarville-Dossainville (French pronunciation: [sesaʁvil dosɛ̃vil]) is a commune in the Loiret department in north-central France. It was created in 1973 by the merger of two former communes: Césarville and Dossainville.

== See also ==
- Communes of the Loiret department
