= Pithiviers-le-Vieil =

- Commune
- Coat of arms
- Location of Pithiviers-le-Vieil
- Location within France Location within Centre-Val de Loire
- Coordinates: 48°09′48″N 2°12′36″E
- Country: France
- Region: Centre-Val de Loire
- Department: Loiret
- Arrondissement: Pithiviers
- Canton: Pithiviers

Government
  - Mayor (2020–2026): Philippe Chaline
- Area^{1}: 33.68 km^{2} (13.00 sq mi)
- Highest elevation: 132 m (433 ft)
- Lowest elevation: 98 m (322 ft)
- Population (2023): 1,718
  - Density: 51.01/km^{2} (132.1/sq mi)
- Time zone: UTC+01:00 (CET)
  - Summer (DST): UTC+02:00 (CEST)
- INSEE/Postal code: 45253 /45300
- ^{1} French Land Register data, which excludes lakes, ponds, glaciers > 1 km^{2} (0.386 sq mi or 247 acres) and river estuaries.

Pithiviers-le-Vieil (French pronunciation: [pitivje lə vjɛj]) is a commune in the Loiret department in north-central France.

== See also ==
- Communes of the Loiret department
