= William Rufane =

British Army general

Lieutenant-General William Rufane

Governor of Martinique
- In office 21 May 1762 – July 1763
- Preceded by: Louis-Charles Le Vassor de La Touche (French)
- Succeeded by: François Louis de Salignac, marquis de la Mothe Fénelon

Personal details
- Died: 14 February 1773 Saint Vincent.
- Occupation: Soldier

William Rufane (died 14 February 1773) was a British soldier who fought in the Seven Years' War, was governor of Martinique in 1762–63 and rose to the rank of lieutenant-general.

== Early career ==
William Rufane was from a family that originated in France, and seems to have formerly been named Ruffane or Ruffine. His brother, Henry Rufane, was a linen draper before joining the navy. He rose to the rank of captain, and was court-martialed for cowardice in an action at sea in July 1745, but later acquitted. William Rufane joined the army in 1721. He was commissioned ensign on 8 February 1722. For many years he served in what would become the 24th Regiment of Foot. He was commissioned captain of Brigadier Thomas Wentworth's Regiment of Foot on 27 September 1737. Rufane was appointed major of the 24th in 1741. On 9 February 1751 Rufane was made lieutenant colonel of the regiment of foot commanded by William Kerr, Earl of Ancram, and William Godfrey, major. By 1752, the 24th Regiment was under the command of Edward Cornwallis and Rufane was posted to Minorca until 1756.

== Seven Years War ==
During the Seven Years War (1756–1763) Britain and France struggled for supremacy in North America. After initial French victories, the British captured Louisbourg in 1758, Quebec City and Guadeloupe in 1759 and Montreal in 1760. On 16 January 1761 Rufane took over command from George Forbes as colonel of the 76th Regiment of Foot. At the capture of Belle Île off the coast of France in 1761 he served with distinction under Lieutenant General Studholme Hodgson. He was then transferred to the West Indies. The 76th participated in the capture of Martinique in early 1762. Robert Monckton left Barbados on 5 January 1762 bound for Martinique with an army of about 14,000 troops and a black labour force of 1,500. After abandoning an attempt on Pigeon Island in Fort Royale Bay, the army disembarked without opposition in Cas Navires Bay on 16 January 1762. The advance on the French positions began on 24 January, the citadel surrendered on 3 February and the remaining French forces capitulated on 14 February 1762.

== Governor of Martinique ==
Monckton appointed Brigadier General William Rufane governor and commander in chief of Martinique and its dependencies on 8 May 1762. Captain Robert Donkin, the future general, was a member of Governor Rufane's staff. (Note: Donkin's son, born in 1772, was named Rufane Shaw Donkin.) On 10 July 1762 Rufane was promoted to major general.

A letter of 2 June 1762 from Rufane to Charles Wyndham, 2nd Earl of Egremont reports that Rufane had ordered a census taken of the inhabitants, free 'Negroes', Mulattos and slaves, with the state of their plantations, etc. He needed additional vessels to prevent smuggling and improve communications. The inhabitants of Saint Lucia had been disarmed and sworn to allegiance, and submissions had been received from Saint Vincent. A tax on houses and 'Negroes' had been raised to provide provisions for troops as military funds were almost exhausted. In a letter from Rufane to Egremont dated 19 July 1762 he enclosed the census and representations from Mr MacLean, receiver general and collector, on matters relating to trade on which he needed instructions. Rufane asked for instructions on various matters concerning the government of the island, and reported difficulties in dealing with criminal matters and taxation. He had issued an ordinance that required all agreements between French and English to be recorded in both languages and signed by both parties before witnesses, except where money is paid on the spot.

The Treaty of Paris was signed on 10 February 1763 by France, Britain and Spain. Spain ceded Florida to Britain. France ceded Île-Royale (Cape Breton Island), Canada (Quebec), the Great Lakes Basin and the land east of the Mississippi River. Britain returned France's West Indian possessions, including Martinique, as well as the French trading posts in India and the slaving station on the Île de Gorée in what is now Senegal.

== See also ==
- List of colonial and departmental heads of Martinique

== Later career ==
Rufane was replaced as governor on 1 July 1763 by François Louis de Salignac^{(et)} (1722–1764), marquis de la Mothe Fénelon. The 76th regiment was disbanded in 1763. Rufane was placed on half pay. On 14 June 1765 Rufane was made colonel of the 6th Regiment of Foot stationed in Scotland, in place of General John Guise, who had died. In 1769 the regiment was transferred to England. Rufane was promoted to lieutenant general in May 1772. In October 1772 the 6th embarked for Saint Vincent in the West Indies, which had been ceded to Britain by the 1763 treaty. Their mission was to subdue rebellious Caribs and Garifuna and confine them to part of the island, or if necessary to move them to another island or to Africa. Rufane died on 14 February 1773 shortly after reaching Saint Vincent and was succeeded by Lieutenant General John Gore of the 61st regiment.

== Sources ==
- "61st Regiment of Foot, 76th Regiment of Foot [1756-1763]", Regiments.Org, archived from the original on 21 November 2007
- "Births, Deaths and Preferments", The Magazine of Magazines, March 1751
- Brigadier William Rufane, St. Peters, Martinique, to Egremont. Sends report of..., National Archives (Britain)
- Cahoon, Ben, "Martinique", Worldstatesmen.org
- Cannon, Richard (1839), Historical record of the Sixth, or Royal First Warwickshire Regiment of Foot: containing an account of the formation of the regiment in the year 1674, and of its subsequent services to 1838, London: Longman, Orme; W. Clowes, ISBN 9780665483431
- Copy of Monckton's commission appointing Brigadier General William Rufane as governor..., National Archives (Britain)
- Eagles, Robin (15 May 2018), "'Skulking on the Poop': the court martial of Captain Henry Rufane 1745", The History of Parliament
- Eccles, William John (2006), "Seven Years War", The Canadian Encyclopedia
- Governor William Rufane, Martinique, to Egremont. Transmits 'recensement' [census] of..., National Archives (Britain)
- Gruber, Ira D. (25 October 2010), Books and the British Army in the Age of the American Revolution, Univ of North Carolina Press, ISBN 978-0-8078-9940-3
- Harding, Richard (9 November 2012), "The War in the West Indies", The Seven Years' War: Global Views, BRILL, ISBN 978-90-04-23644-8
- Jaenen, Cosnelius J. (2013), "Treaty of Paris 1763", The Canadian Encyclopedia
- Oettle, Mike (2009), General Sir Rufane Shaw Donkin, Clan Duncan Society
- Yonge, William (1740), A List of the Colonels, Lieutenant Colonels, Majors, Captains, Lieutenants, and Ensigns of His Majesty's Forces on the British Establishment..., T. Cox / Great Britain. War Office
