= Châtillon-le-Roi =

- Commune
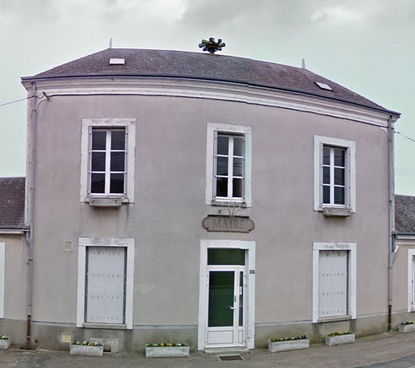
- Town hall

- Coat of arms
- Location of Châtillon-le-Roi
- Location within France Location within Centre-Val de Loire
- Coordinates: 48°09′51″N 2°06′27″E
- Country: France
- Region: Centre-Val de Loire
- Department: Loiret
- Arrondissement: Pithiviers
- Canton: Pithiviers
- Intercommunality: CC Plaine du Nord Loiret

Government
  - Mayor (2020–2026): Céline Dupré
- Area^{1}: 4.54 km^{2} (1.75 sq mi)
- Highest elevation: 136 m (446 ft)
- Lowest elevation: 118 m (387 ft)
- Population (2023): 278
  - Density: 61.2/km^{2} (159/sq mi)
- Demonym: Châtillonnais
- Time zone: UTC+01:00 (CET)
  - Summer (DST): UTC+02:00 (CEST)
- INSEE/Postal code: 45086 /45480
- ^{1} French Land Register data, which excludes lakes, ponds, glaciers > 1 km^{2} (0.386 sq mi or 247 acres) and river estuaries.

Châtillon-le-Roi (French pronunciation: [ʃatijɔ̃ lə ʁwa]) is a commune in the Loiret department in north-central France. As of 2023, the population of the commune was 278.

== See also ==
- Communes of the Loiret department
