= Bazoches-les-Gallerandes =

- Commune
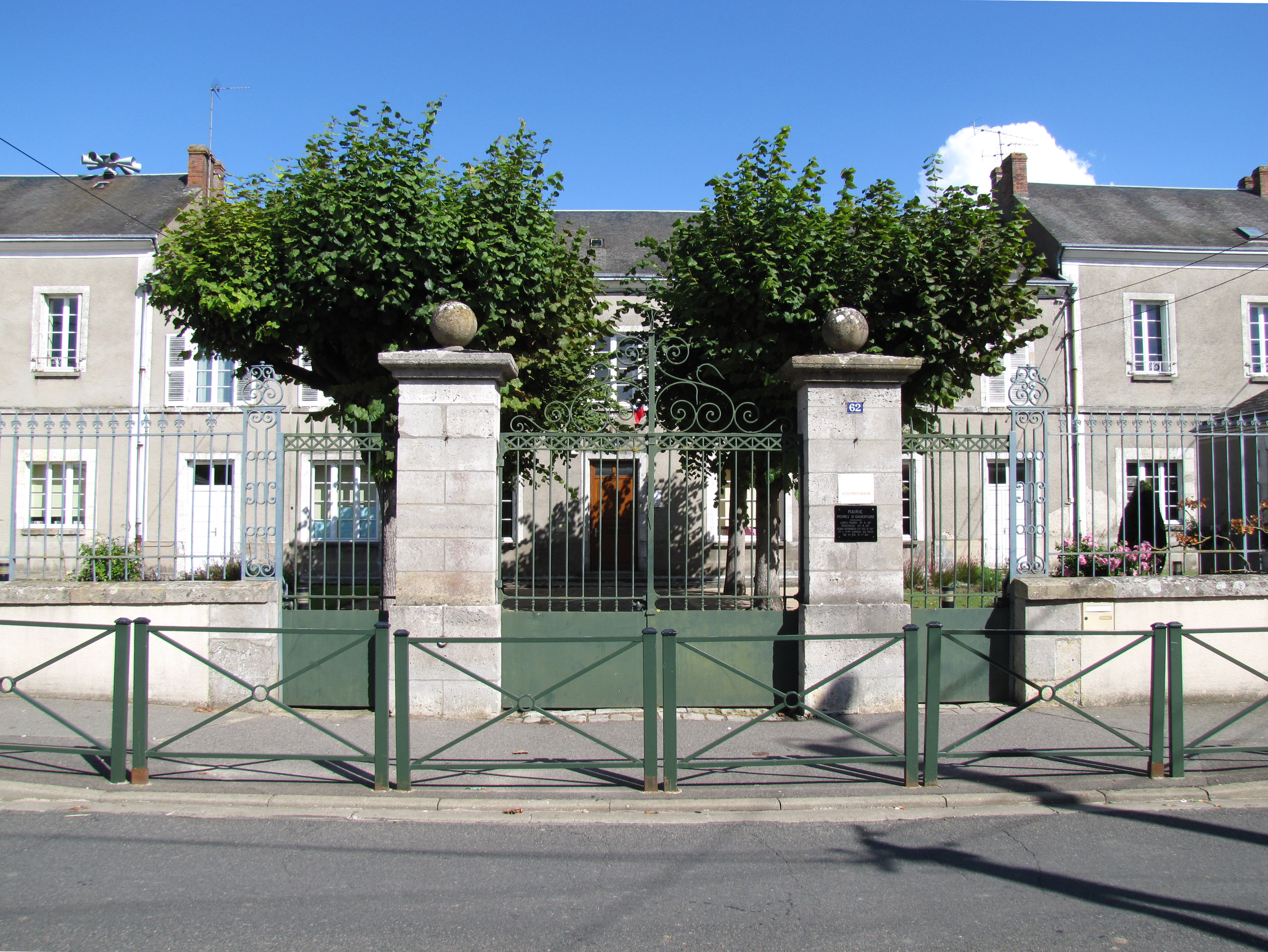
- The town hall in Bazoches-les-Gallerandes

- Coat of arms
- Location of Bazoches-les-Gallerandes
- Location within France Location within Centre-Val de Loire
- Coordinates: 48°09′47″N 2°02′38″E
- Country: France
- Region: Centre-Val de Loire
- Department: Loiret
- Arrondissement: Pithiviers
- Canton: Pithiviers
- Intercommunality: Plaine du Nord Loiret

Government
  - Mayor (2020–2026): Alain Chachignon
- Area^{1}: 36.73 km^{2} (14.18 sq mi)
- Highest elevation: 137 m (449 ft)
- Lowest elevation: 120 m (390 ft)
- Population (2023): 1,465
  - Density: 39.89/km^{2} (103.3/sq mi)
- Time zone: UTC+01:00 (CET)
  - Summer (DST): UTC+02:00 (CEST)
- INSEE/Postal code: 45025 /45480
- ^{1} French Land Register data, which excludes lakes, ponds, glaciers > 1 km^{2} (0.386 sq mi or 247 acres) and river estuaries.

Bazoches-les-Gallerandes (French pronunciation: [bazɔʃ le ɡalʁɑ̃d]) is a commune in the Loiret department in north-central France. In 1973 it absorbed the former commune Izy.

== Population ==
Historical population
Year	Pop.	±% p.a.
1968	1,063	—
1975	1,216	+1.94%
1982	1,325	+1.23%
1990	1,326	+0.01%
1999	1,348	+0.18%
2007	1,442	+0.85%
2012	1,484	+0.58%
2017	1,538	+0.72%
2023	1,465	−0.81%
Source: INSEE

== See also ==
- Communes of the Loiret department
