= Tivernon =

- Commune
- Location of Tivernon
- Location within France Location within Centre-Val de Loire
- Coordinates: 48°09′22″N 1°55′52″E
- Country: France
- Region: Centre-Val de Loire
- Department: Loiret
- Arrondissement: Pithiviers
- Canton: Pithiviers
- Intercommunality: CC Plaine du Nord Loiret

Government
  - Mayor (2020–2026): Delphine Bruchet
- Area^{1}: 12.61 km^{2} (4.87 sq mi)
- Highest elevation: 139 m (456 ft)
- Lowest elevation: 125 m (410 ft)
- Population (2023): 278
  - Density: 22.0/km^{2} (57.1/sq mi)
- Time zone: UTC+01:00 (CET)
  - Summer (DST): UTC+02:00 (CEST)
- INSEE/Postal code: 45325 /45170
- ^{1} French Land Register data, which excludes lakes, ponds, glaciers > 1 km^{2} (0.386 sq mi or 247 acres) and river estuaries.

Tivernon (French pronunciation: [tivɛʁnɔ̃]) is a commune in the Loiret department in north-central France.

== See also ==
- Communes of the Loiret department
