= Dadonville =

- Commune
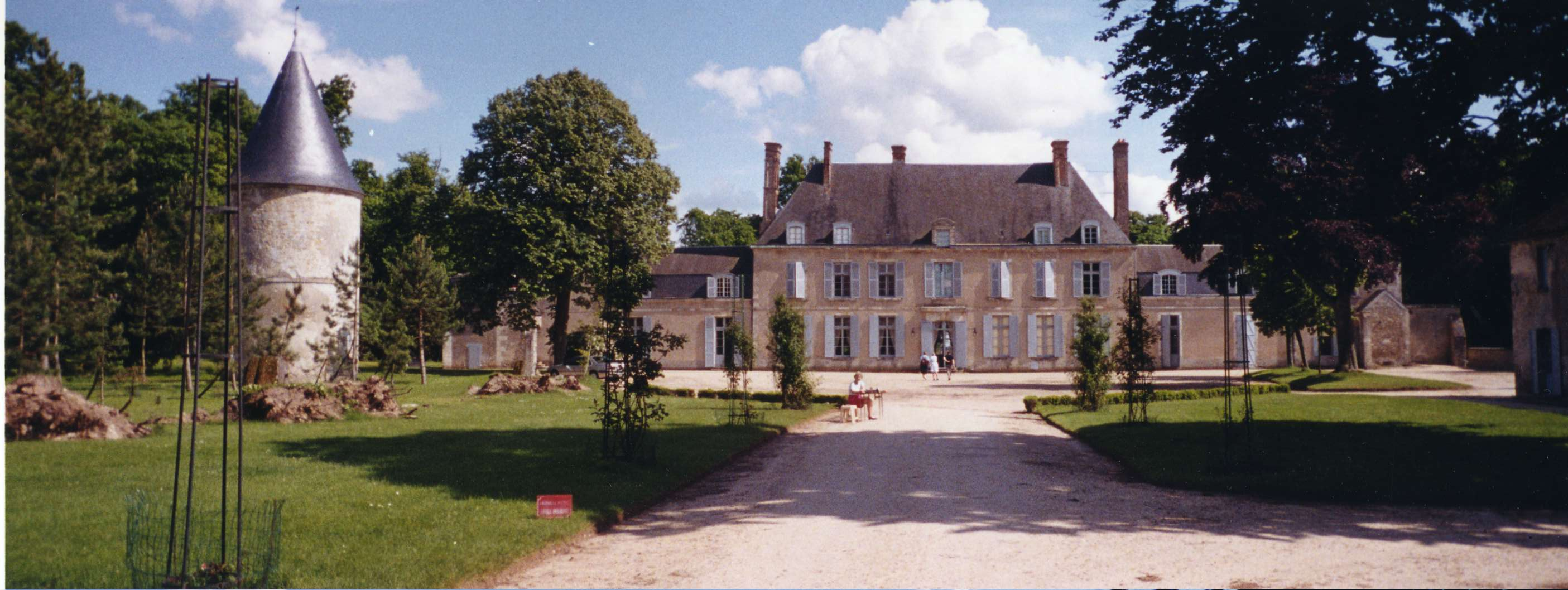
- The chateau in Dadonville
- Location of Dadonville
- Location within France Location within Centre-Val de Loire
- Coordinates: 48°08′35″N 2°15′11″E
- Country: France
- Region: Centre-Val de Loire
- Department: Loiret
- Arrondissement: Pithiviers
- Canton: Pithiviers
- Intercommunality: Pithiverais

Government
  - Mayor (2020–2026): Evelyne Charvin
- Area^{1}: 18.21 km^{2} (7.03 sq mi)
- Highest elevation: 125 m (410 ft)
- Lowest elevation: 96 m (315 ft)
- Population (2023): 2,354
  - Density: 129.3/km^{2} (334.8/sq mi)
- Demonym: Dadonvillois
- Time zone: UTC+01:00 (CET)
  - Summer (DST): UTC+02:00 (CEST)
- INSEE/Postal code: 45119 /45300
- ^{1} French Land Register data, which excludes lakes, ponds, glaciers > 1 km^{2} (0.386 sq mi or 247 acres) and river estuaries.

Dadonville (French pronunciation: [dadɔ̃vil]) is a commune in the Loiret department in north-central France.

== Population ==
Historical population
Year	Pop.	±% p.a.
1968	735	—
1975	854	+2.17%
1982	1,249	+5.58%
1990	1,715	+4.04%
1999	1,873	+0.98%
2007	2,008	+0.87%
2012	2,437	+3.95%
2017	2,433	−0.03%
2023	2,354	−0.55%
Source: INSEE

== See also ==
- Communes of the Loiret department
