= Andonville =

- Commune
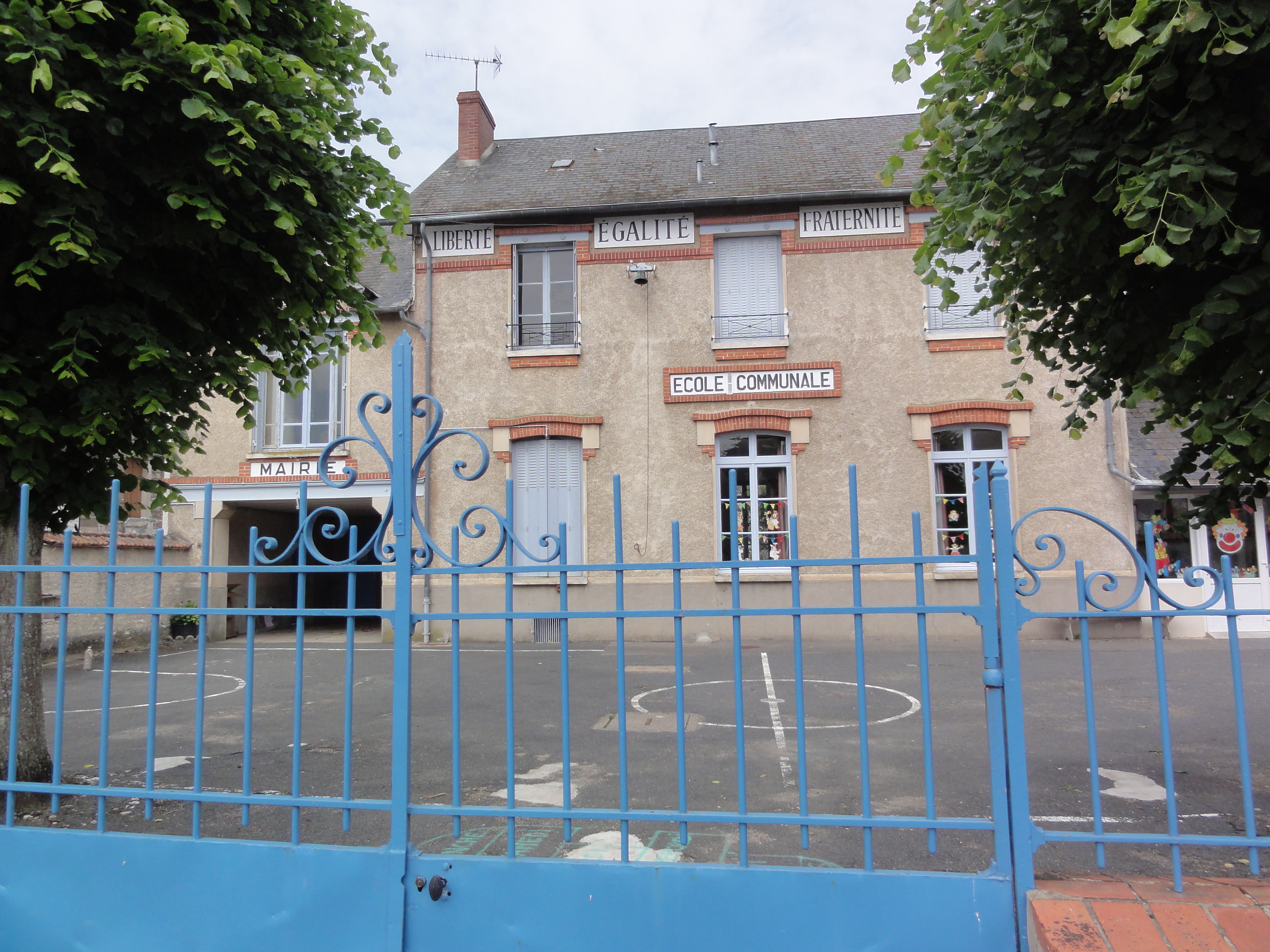
- The town hall and school in Andonville
- Location of Andonville
- Location within France Location within Centre-Val de Loire
- Coordinates: 48°16′16″N 2°01′55″E
- Country: France
- Region: Centre-Val de Loire
- Department: Loiret
- Arrondissement: Pithiviers
- Canton: Pithiviers
- Intercommunality: Plaine du Nord Loiret

Government
  - Mayor (2020–2026): Jean-Marc Lirot
- Area^{1}: 11.94 km^{2} (4.61 sq mi)
- Highest elevation: 140 m (460 ft)
- Lowest elevation: 112 m (367 ft)
- Population (2023): 247
  - Density: 20.7/km^{2} (53.6/sq mi)
- Time zone: UTC+01:00 (CET)
  - Summer (DST): UTC+02:00 (CEST)
- INSEE/Postal code: 45005 /45480
- ^{1} French Land Register data, which excludes lakes, ponds, glaciers > 1 km^{2} (0.386 sq mi or 247 acres) and river estuaries.

Andonville (French pronunciation: [ɑ̃dɔ̃vil]) is a commune in the Loiret department in north-central France.

== Population ==
Historical population
Year	Pop.	±% p.a.
1968	194	—
1975	184	−0.75%
1982	157	−2.24%
1990	175	+1.37%
1999	217	+2.42%
2007	200	−1.01%
2012	208	+0.79%
2017	246	+3.41%
2023	247	+0.07%
Source: INSEE

== See also ==
- Communes of the Loiret department
