= Erceville =

- Commune
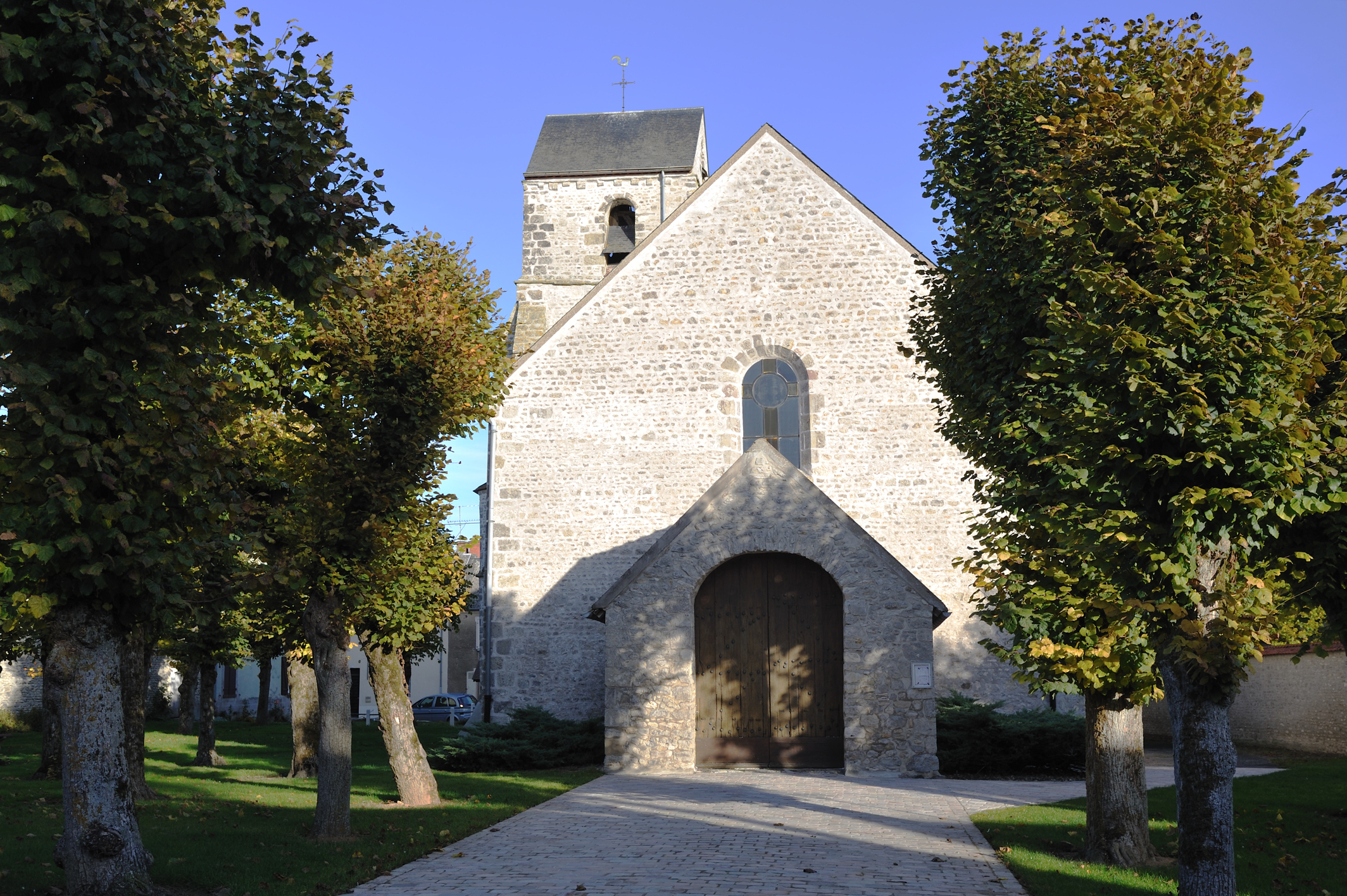
- The church in Erceville
- Location of Erceville
- Location within France Location within Centre-Val de Loire
- Coordinates: 48°14′24″N 2°02′14″E
- Country: France
- Region: Centre-Val de Loire
- Department: Loiret
- Arrondissement: Pithiviers
- Canton: Pithiviers
- Intercommunality: CC Plaine du Nord Loiret

Government
  - Mayor (2020–2026): Bertrand Poisson
- Area^{1}: 12.72 km^{2} (4.91 sq mi)
- Highest elevation: 137 m (449 ft)
- Lowest elevation: 110 m (360 ft)
- Population (2023): 291
  - Density: 22.9/km^{2} (59.3/sq mi)
- Demonym: Ercevillois
- Time zone: UTC+01:00 (CET)
  - Summer (DST): UTC+02:00 (CEST)
- INSEE/Postal code: 45135 /45480
- ^{1} French Land Register data, which excludes lakes, ponds, glaciers > 1 km^{2} (0.386 sq mi or 247 acres) and river estuaries.

Erceville (French pronunciation: [ɛʁsəvil]) is a commune in the Loiret department in north-central France.

== See also ==
- Communes of the Loiret department
