= Montigny, Loiret =

Montigny
- Commune
- Coat of arms
- Location of Montigny
- Location within France Location within Centre-Val de Loire
- Coordinates: 48°06′48″N 2°06′47″E
- Country: France
- Region: Centre-Val de Loire
- Department: Loiret
- Arrondissement: Orléans
- Canton: Pithiviers
- Intercommunality: CC de la Forêt

Government
  - Mayor (2020–2026): Christian Massein
- Area^{1}: 5.36 km^{2} (2.07 sq mi)
- Highest elevation: 134 m (440 ft)
- Lowest elevation: 115 m (377 ft)
- Population (2023): 246
  - Density: 45.9/km^{2} (119/sq mi)
- Time zone: UTC+01:00 (CET)
  - Summer (DST): UTC+02:00 (CEST)
- INSEE/Postal code: 45214 /45170
- ^{1} French Land Register data, which excludes lakes, ponds, glaciers > 1 km^{2} (0.386 sq mi or 247 acres) and river estuaries.

Montigny (French pronunciation: [mɔ̃tiɲi]) is a commune in the Loiret department in north-central France.

== See also ==
- Communes of the Loiret department
