= Jules Brésil =

French writer (1818–1899)

Jules-Henri Brésil (8 May 1818 – 22 October 1899) was a French writer who collaborated with Adolphe d'Ennery on the librettos of at least two operas.

== Life ==
Brésil was born in Paris and died in Bois-Colombes. He married mezzo soprano Lucile Henriette Mondutaigny on 20 June 1848. Brésil's granddaughter Marguerite Lucile Brésil was an actress.

== Works ==
- 1839: Une mauvaise plaisanterie, vaudeville in 1 act), with Adolphe Guénée
- 1842: La Dernière Heure d'un condamné, monologue in verses
- 1845: Constant-la-Girouette, comédie-vaudeville in 1 act, music by Adolphe Adam, with Eugène Grangé
- 1852: Si j'étais roi, opéra comique in 3 acts, with Adolphe d'Ennery
- 1853: Les Œuvres du démon, melodrama in 5 acts
- 1856: Vénus au moulin d'Ampiphros, tableau bouffon et mythologique in 1 act, music by Paul Destribaud
- 1856: La Parade (opérette), music by Émile Jonas
- 1857: Les Orphelines de la charité, drama in 5 acts, with Adolphe d'Ennery
- 1859: Le Martyre du cœur, drama in 5 acts in prose, with Victor Séjour
- 1860: Quittons Nuremberg, operetta in 1 act
- 1860: L'Escamoteur, drama in 5 acts, with Adolphe d'Ennery
- 1860: L'Ondine
- 1861: Silvio-Silvia, opéra comique in 1 act, music by Paul Destribaud
- Les Orléanais (drame), music by Eugène Prévost
- 1876: La Mandragore, music by Henry Litolff
- 1880: Diana, drama in 5 acts
- 1881:Le tribut de Zamora, music by Charles Gounod
- 1885: La Couronne des reines ! (Mélodie, lyrics by d'Ennery and Brésil), music by Gounod
- 1888: L'Escadron volant de la reine, avec Adolphe d'Ennery, music by Litolff
- 1889: Aubade à la fiancée (poetry by A. Dennery and J. Brésil), music by Charles Gounod

== Bibliography ==
- Ferdinand-Camille Dreyfus, André Berthelot, La Grande Encyclopédie : inventaire raisonné des sciences, des lettres et des arts, vol.7, 1885, p. 1127
- Jules Martin, Nos auteurs et compositeurs dramatiques, 1897, (p. 80)
- Jules Claretie, La Vie à Paris, 1900, (p. 281–289) (obituary)
- Henry Lyonnet, Dictionnaire des comédiens français (ceux d'hier), 1910
- Joann Elart, Catalogue des fonds musicaux conservés en Haute-Normandie, 2004, (p. 744–830)
