= Audeville =

- Commune
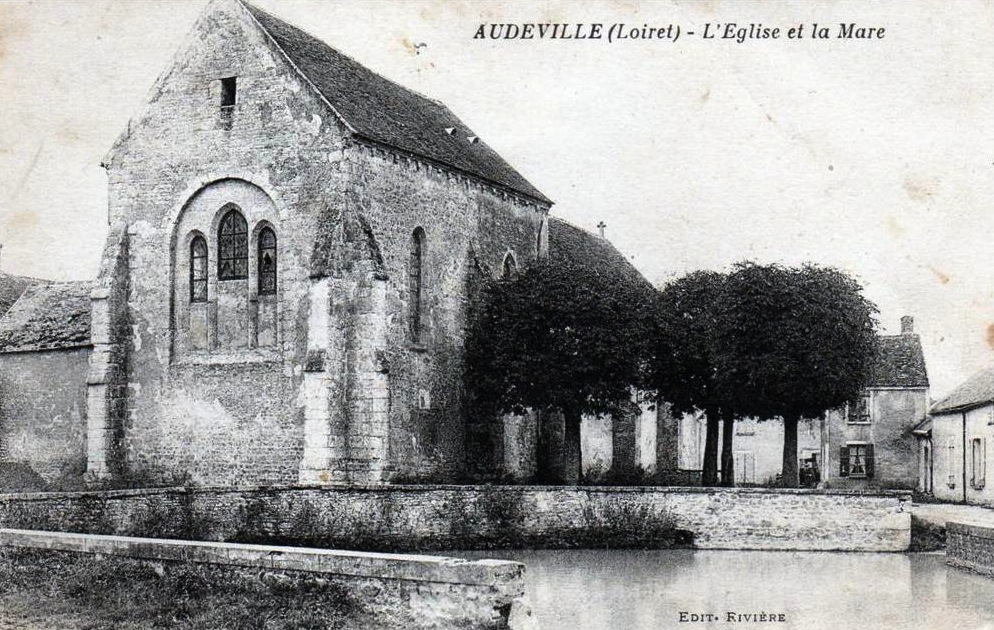
- An old postcard view of the church in Audeville
- Location of Audeville
- Location within France Location within Centre-Val de Loire
- Coordinates: 48°16′44″N 2°14′20″E
- Country: France
- Region: Centre-Val de Loire
- Department: Loiret
- Arrondissement: Pithiviers
- Canton: Pithiviers
- Intercommunality: Pithiverais

Government
  - Mayor (2020–2026): Matthieu Chenu
- Area^{1}: 12.71 km^{2} (4.91 sq mi)
- Highest elevation: 137 m (449 ft)
- Lowest elevation: 120 m (390 ft)
- Population (2023): 179
  - Density: 14.1/km^{2} (36.5/sq mi)
- Time zone: UTC+01:00 (CET)
  - Summer (DST): UTC+02:00 (CEST)
- INSEE/Postal code: 45012 /45300
- ^{1} French Land Register data, which excludes lakes, ponds, glaciers > 1 km^{2} (0.386 sq mi or 247 acres) and river estuaries.

Audeville (French pronunciation: [odvil]) is a commune in the Loiret department in north-central France.

== Population ==
Historical population
Year	Pop.	±% p.a.
1968	159	—
1975	132	−2.62%
1982	121	−1.24%
1990	173	+4.57%
1999	161	−0.80%
2007	163	+0.15%
2012	183	+2.34%
2017	190	+0.75%
2023	179	−0.99%
Source: INSEE

== See also ==
- Communes of the Loiret department
