= Pannecières =

- Commune
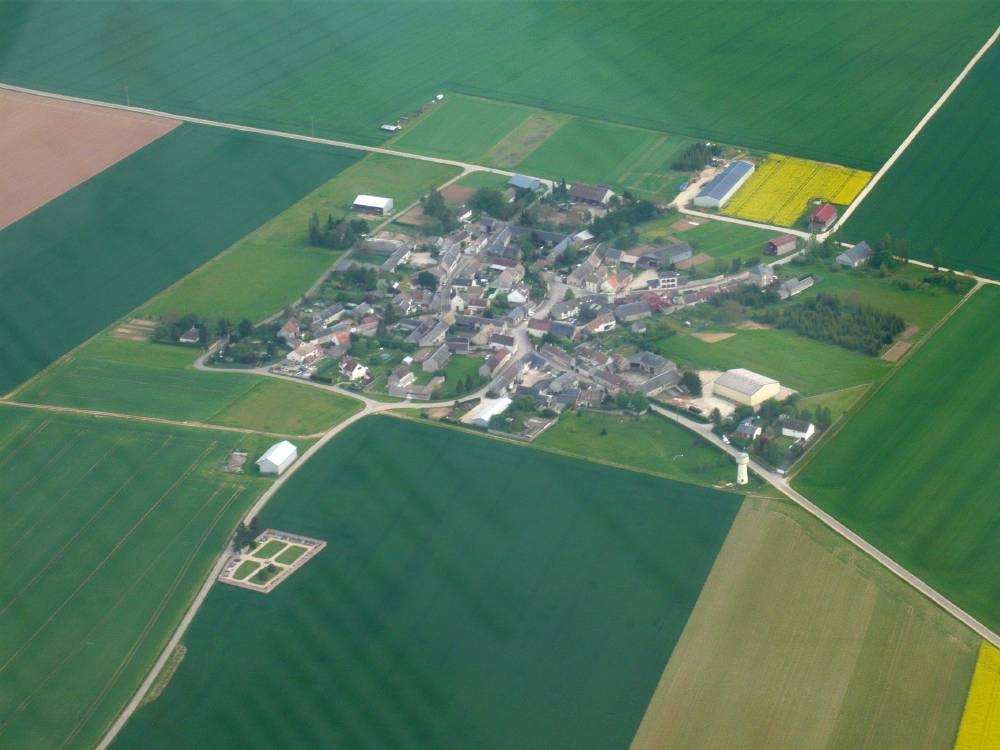
- An aerial view of Pannecières
- Location of Pannecières
- Location within France Location within Centre-Val de Loire
- Coordinates: 48°17′36″N 2°08′52″E
- Country: France
- Region: Centre-Val de Loire
- Department: Loiret
- Arrondissement: Pithiviers
- Canton: Pithiviers
- Intercommunality: Pithiverais

Government
  - Mayor (2020–2026): José Bréchemier
- Area^{1}: 7.02 km^{2} (2.71 sq mi)
- Highest elevation: 136 m (446 ft)
- Lowest elevation: 120 m (390 ft)
- Population (2023): 114
  - Density: 16.2/km^{2} (42.1/sq mi)
- Demonym: Pannecièrois
- Time zone: UTC+01:00 (CET)
  - Summer (DST): UTC+02:00 (CEST)
- INSEE/Postal code: 45246 /45300
- ^{1} French Land Register data, which excludes lakes, ponds, glaciers > 1 km^{2} (0.386 sq mi or 247 acres) and river estuaries.

Pannecières (French pronunciation: [pansjɛʁ]) is a commune in the Loiret department in north-central France.

Pannecieres is a small village in a rural area located 62 km south of Paris, France.

Agriculture is the main resource, while more and more "suburbanites" are moving in to become "rurbanites".

== See also ==
- Communes of the Loiret department
