= Intville-la-Guétard =

- Commune
- Location of Intville-la-Guétard
- Location within France Location within Centre-Val de Loire
- Coordinates: 48°15′39″N 2°12′51″E
- Country: France
- Region: Centre-Val de Loire
- Department: Loiret
- Arrondissement: Pithiviers
- Canton: Pithiviers
- Intercommunality: Pithiverais

Government
  - Mayor (2020–2026): Gilles Alanic
- Area^{1}: 4.88 km^{2} (1.88 sq mi)
- Highest elevation: 134 m (440 ft)
- Lowest elevation: 120 m (390 ft)
- Population (2023): 164
  - Density: 33.6/km^{2} (87.0/sq mi)
- Demonym: Intvillois
- Time zone: UTC+01:00 (CET)
  - Summer (DST): UTC+02:00 (CEST)
- INSEE/Postal code: 45170 /45300
- ^{1} French Land Register data, which excludes lakes, ponds, glaciers > 1 km^{2} (0.386 sq mi or 247 acres) and river estuaries.

Intville-la-Guétard (French pronunciation: [ɛ̃tvil la ɡetaʁ]) is a commune in the Loiret department in north-central France.

== See also ==
- Communes of the Loiret department
