= Bougy-lez-Neuville =

- Commune
- Location of Bougy-lez-Neuville
- Location within France Location within Centre-Val de Loire
- Coordinates: 48°02′27″N 2°01′41″E
- Country: France
- Region: Centre-Val de Loire
- Department: Loiret
- Arrondissement: Orléans
- Canton: Pithiviers

Government
  - Mayor (2020–2026): Isabelle Marois
- Area^{1}: 16.73 km^{2} (6.46 sq mi)
- Highest elevation: 144 m (472 ft)
- Lowest elevation: 116 m (381 ft)
- Population (2023): 154
  - Density: 9.21/km^{2} (23.8/sq mi)
- Time zone: UTC+01:00 (CET)
  - Summer (DST): UTC+02:00 (CEST)
- INSEE/Postal code: 45044 /45170
- ^{1} French Land Register data, which excludes lakes, ponds, glaciers > 1 km^{2} (0.386 sq mi or 247 acres) and river estuaries.

Bougy-lez-Neuville (French pronunciation: [buʒi lɛ nøvil]) is a commune in the Loiret department in north-central France.

== Population ==
Historical population
Year	Pop.	±% p.a.
1968	93	—
1975	95	+0.30%
1982	148	+6.54%
1990	180	+2.48%
1999	177	−0.19%
2007	171	−0.43%
2012	189	+2.02%
2017	159	−3.40%
2023	154	−0.53%
Source: INSEE

== See also ==
- Communes of the Loiret department
