= 76th Regiment of Foot (1756) =

- Active: 1756
- Disbanded: 1763
- Country: Great Britain
- Allegiance: Army
- Type: Regiment

The 76th Regiment of Foot was a regiment of the British Army from 1756 (when it was originally created the 61st Regiment of Foot) to 1763.

The regiment was redesignated the 76th Foot in 1758 when a number of lower numbered (and thus senior) regiments divided into two. In 1758 the second battalion of the 76th regiment itself became the 86th Regiment of Foot. The regiment disbanded in 1763.

== Regimental Colonels ==
- 1756–1761: Lt-Gen. George Forbes, 4th Earl of Granard (Viscount Forbes)
- 1761–1763: Lt-Gen. William Rufane
