= Chaussy, Loiret =

Chaussy
- Commune
- Coat of arms
- Location of Chaussy
- Location within France Location within Centre-Val de Loire
- Coordinates: 48°10′09″N 1°59′48″E
- Country: France
- Region: Centre-Val de Loire
- Department: Loiret
- Arrondissement: Pithiviers
- Canton: Pithiviers
- Intercommunality: CC Plaine du Nord Loiret

Government
  - Mayor (2020–2026): Pierre Rousseau
- Area^{1}: 12.94 km^{2} (5.00 sq mi)
- Highest elevation: 135 m (443 ft)
- Lowest elevation: 107 m (351 ft)
- Population (2023): 278
  - Density: 21.5/km^{2} (55.6/sq mi)
- Demonym: Calcédoniens
- Time zone: UTC+01:00 (CET)
  - Summer (DST): UTC+02:00 (CEST)
- INSEE/Postal code: 45088 /45480
- ^{1} French Land Register data, which excludes lakes, ponds, glaciers > 1 km^{2} (0.386 sq mi or 247 acres) and river estuaries.

Chaussy (French pronunciation: [ʃosi]) is a commune in the Loiret department in north-central France in the Centre-Val de Loire region.

== See also ==
- Communes of the Loiret department
