= Lucile Henriette Mondutaigny =

French singer (1826–1901)

Lucile Henriette Mondutaigny (12 February 1826 – 24 February 1901) was a French singer.

== Life ==
Born in Lyon, she attained first prize in singing and second prize in opera at the Conservatoire de Paris in 1844. She married Jules Brésil 20 June 1848. A mezzo-soprano, she achieved recognition in the role of Alice in Meyerbeer's Robert le Diable (1844) then in the première of César Franck's oratorio Ruth, presented on 1 November 1845 in the Salle Érard and performed until she was over 80 years old.

She was also a teacher of voice and piano.

She died in Paris in 1901.

== Bibliography ==
- Félix Clément, Pierre Larousse, Arthur Pougin, Dictionnaire des opéras, 1969, vol.2, p. 311
