= Rouvres-Saint-Jean =

- Commune
- Location of Rouvres-Saint-Jean
- Location within France Location within Centre-Val de Loire
- Coordinates: 48°19′24″N 2°12′43″E
- Country: France
- Region: Centre-Val de Loire
- Department: Loiret
- Arrondissement: Pithiviers
- Canton: Pithiviers
- Intercommunality: Pithiverais

Government
  - Mayor (2020–2026): Jean-Luc Bretonnet
- Area^{1}: 10.10 km^{2} (3.90 sq mi)
- Highest elevation: 142 m (466 ft)
- Lowest elevation: 99 m (325 ft)
- Population (2023): 298
  - Density: 29.5/km^{2} (76.4/sq mi)
- Time zone: UTC+01:00 (CET)
  - Summer (DST): UTC+02:00 (CEST)
- INSEE/Postal code: 45263 /45300
- ^{1} French Land Register data, which excludes lakes, ponds, glaciers > 1 km^{2} (0.386 sq mi or 247 acres) and river estuaries.

Rouvres-Saint-Jean (French pronunciation: [ʁuvʁ sɛ̃ ʒɑ̃]) is a commune in the Loiret department in north-central France.

== See also ==
- Communes of the Loiret department
