= Sermaises =

- Commune
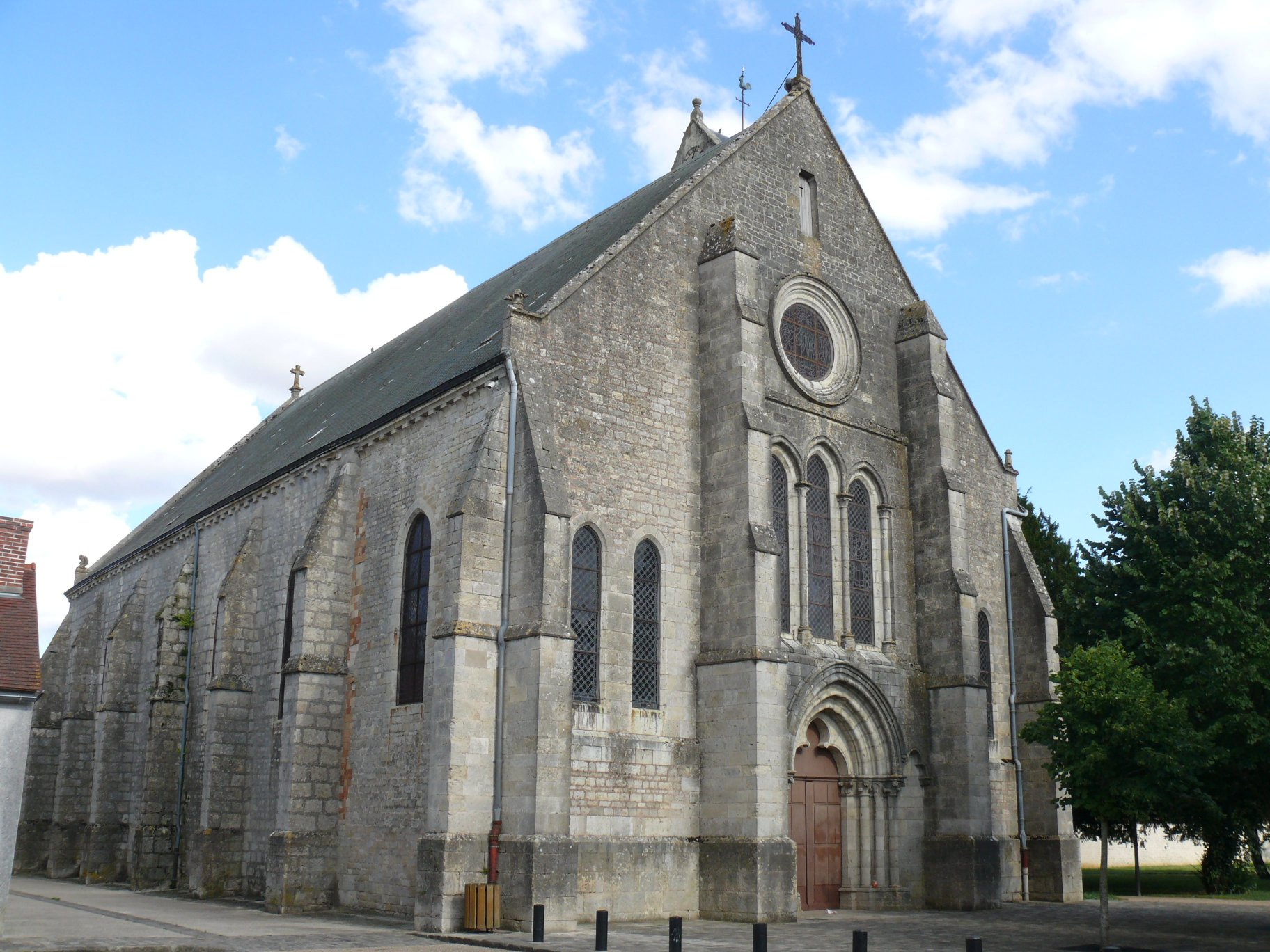
- The church in Sermaises
- Location of Sermaises
- Location within France Location within Centre-Val de Loire
- Coordinates: 48°17′50″N 2°12′20″E
- Country: France
- Region: Centre-Val de Loire
- Department: Loiret
- Arrondissement: Pithiviers
- Canton: Pithiviers
- Intercommunality: Pithiverais

Government
  - Mayor (2020–2026): James Bruneau
- Area^{1}: 21.25 km^{2} (8.20 sq mi)
- Highest elevation: 139 m (456 ft)
- Lowest elevation: 104 m (341 ft)
- Population (2023): 1,709
  - Density: 80.42/km^{2} (208.3/sq mi)
- Time zone: UTC+01:00 (CET)
  - Summer (DST): UTC+02:00 (CEST)
- INSEE/Postal code: 45310 /45300
- ^{1} French Land Register data, which excludes lakes, ponds, glaciers > 1 km^{2} (0.386 sq mi or 247 acres) and river estuaries.

Sermaises (French pronunciation: [sɛʁmɛz]) is a commune in the Loiret department in north-central France.

== See also ==
- Communes of the Loiret department
