= Villereau, Loiret =

Villereau
- Commune
- Coat of arms
- Location of Villereau
- Location within France Location within Centre-Val de Loire
- Coordinates: 48°04′12″N 1°59′21″E
- Country: France
- Region: Centre-Val de Loire
- Department: Loiret
- Arrondissement: Orléans
- Canton: Pithiviers
- Intercommunality: CC de la Forêt

Government
  - Mayor (2024–2026): Adrien Maillard
- Area^{1}: 9.12 km^{2} (3.52 sq mi)
- Highest elevation: 132 m (433 ft)
- Lowest elevation: 120 m (390 ft)
- Population (2023): 407
  - Density: 44.6/km^{2} (116/sq mi)
- Time zone: UTC+01:00 (CET)
  - Summer (DST): UTC+02:00 (CEST)
- INSEE/Postal code: 45342 /45170
- ^{1} French Land Register data, which excludes lakes, ponds, glaciers > 1 km^{2} (0.386 sq mi or 247 acres) and river estuaries.

Villereau (French pronunciation: [vilʁo]) is a commune in the Loiret department in north-central France.

== See also ==
- Communes of the Loiret department
