= Aschères-le-Marché =

- Commune
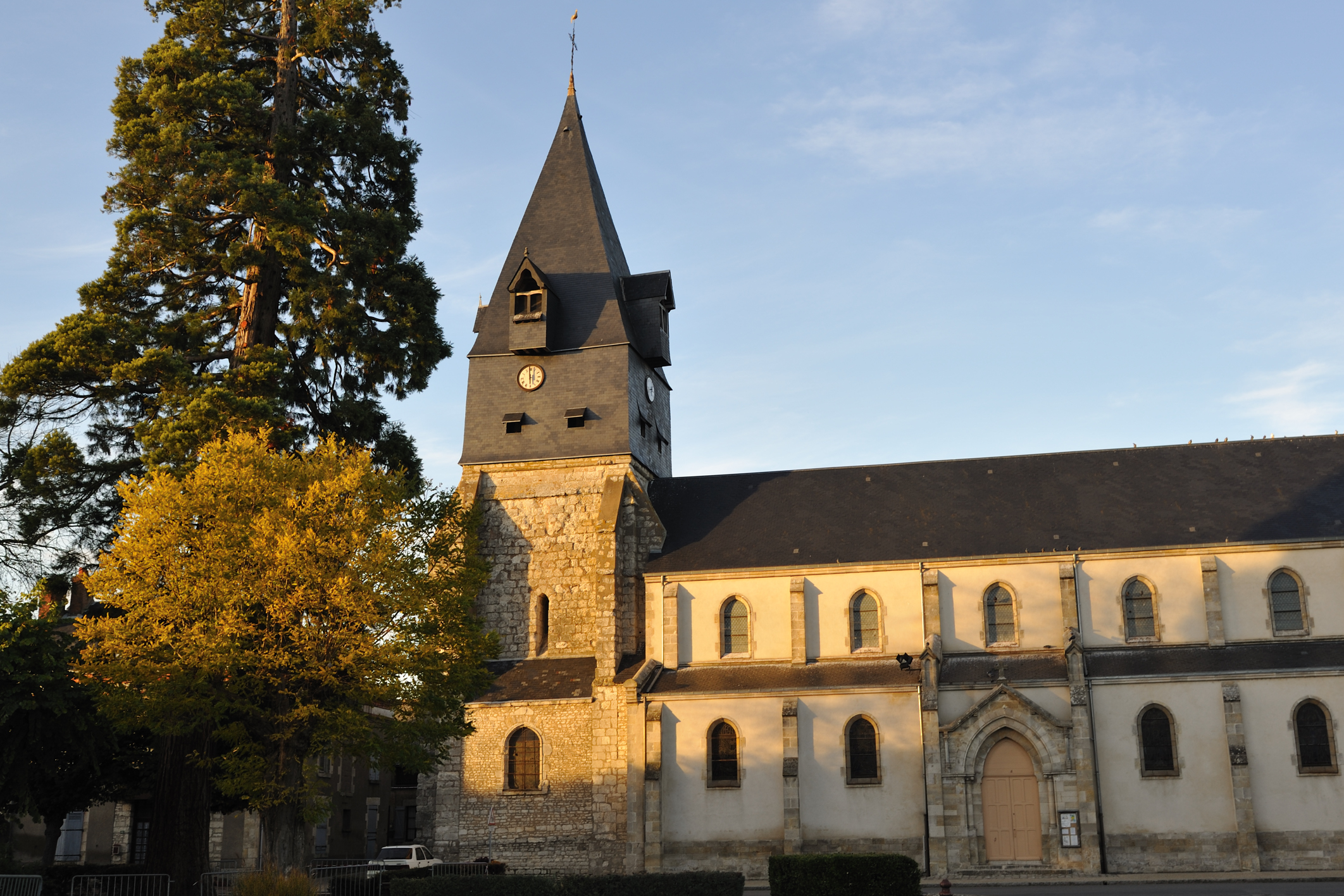
- The church in Aschères-le-Marché

- Coat of arms
- Location of Aschères-le-Marché
- Location within France Location within Centre-Val de Loire
- Coordinates: 48°06′29″N 2°00′32″E
- Country: France
- Region: Centre-Val de Loire
- Department: Loiret
- Arrondissement: Pithiviers
- Canton: Pithiviers
- Intercommunality: CC Forêt

Government
  - Mayor (2020–2026): Christian Legendre
- Area^{1}: 20.9 km^{2} (8.1 sq mi)
- Highest elevation: 133 m (436 ft)
- Lowest elevation: 121 m (397 ft)
- Population (2023): 1,157
  - Density: 55.4/km^{2} (143/sq mi)
- Demonym: Aschèrois
- Time zone: UTC+01:00 (CET)
  - Summer (DST): UTC+02:00 (CEST)
- INSEE/Postal code: 45009 /45170
- Website: www.ascheres.fr
- ^{1} French Land Register data, which excludes lakes, ponds, glaciers > 1 km^{2} (0.386 sq mi or 247 acres) and river estuaries.

Aschères-le-Marché (French pronunciation: [aʃɛʁ lə maʁʃe]; lit. 'Aschères-the-Market') or simply Aschères is a commune in the Loiret department in north-central France.

== Population ==
Historical population
Year	Pop.	±% p.a.
1968	808	—
1975	780	−0.50%
1982	809	+0.52%
1990	927	+1.72%
1999	1,052	+1.42%
2007	1,166	+1.29%
2012	1,182	+0.27%
2017	1,145	−0.63%
2023	1,157	+0.17%
Source: INSEE

== See also ==
- Communes of the Loiret department
