= La Fère Regiment =

Régiment de La Fère
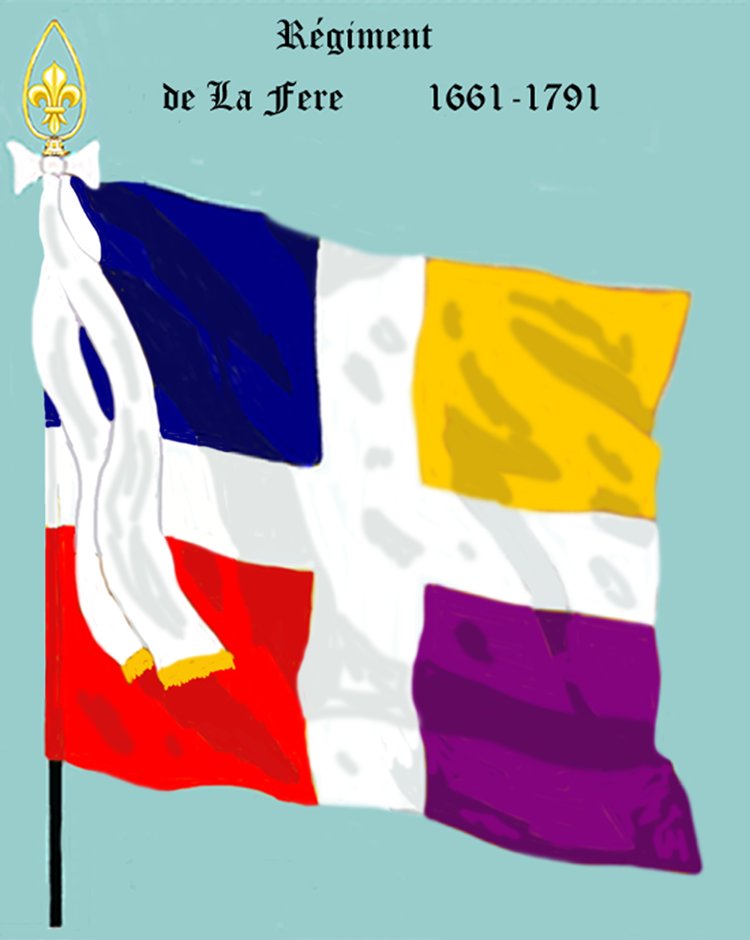
- Standard of the Régiment de La Fère
- Active: 1654–1795
- Country: Kingdom of France
- Role: Line infantry
- Size: 2 battalions

Le Régiment de La Fère was a regiment of infantry of the Kingdom of France, formed in 1645 as the Régiment de Mazarin-Français. It was renamed in 1661, and during the French Revolution it became the 52nd Line Infantry Regiment (52e régiment d’infanterie de ligne). In 1794, its 2nd Battalion became part of the 104e demi-brigade de bataille, and it ceased to exist when its 1st Battalion was made part of the 103e demi-brigade de bataille.
