= Beauce, France =

Natural region in north-central France

Coordinates: 48.2°N 1.7°E

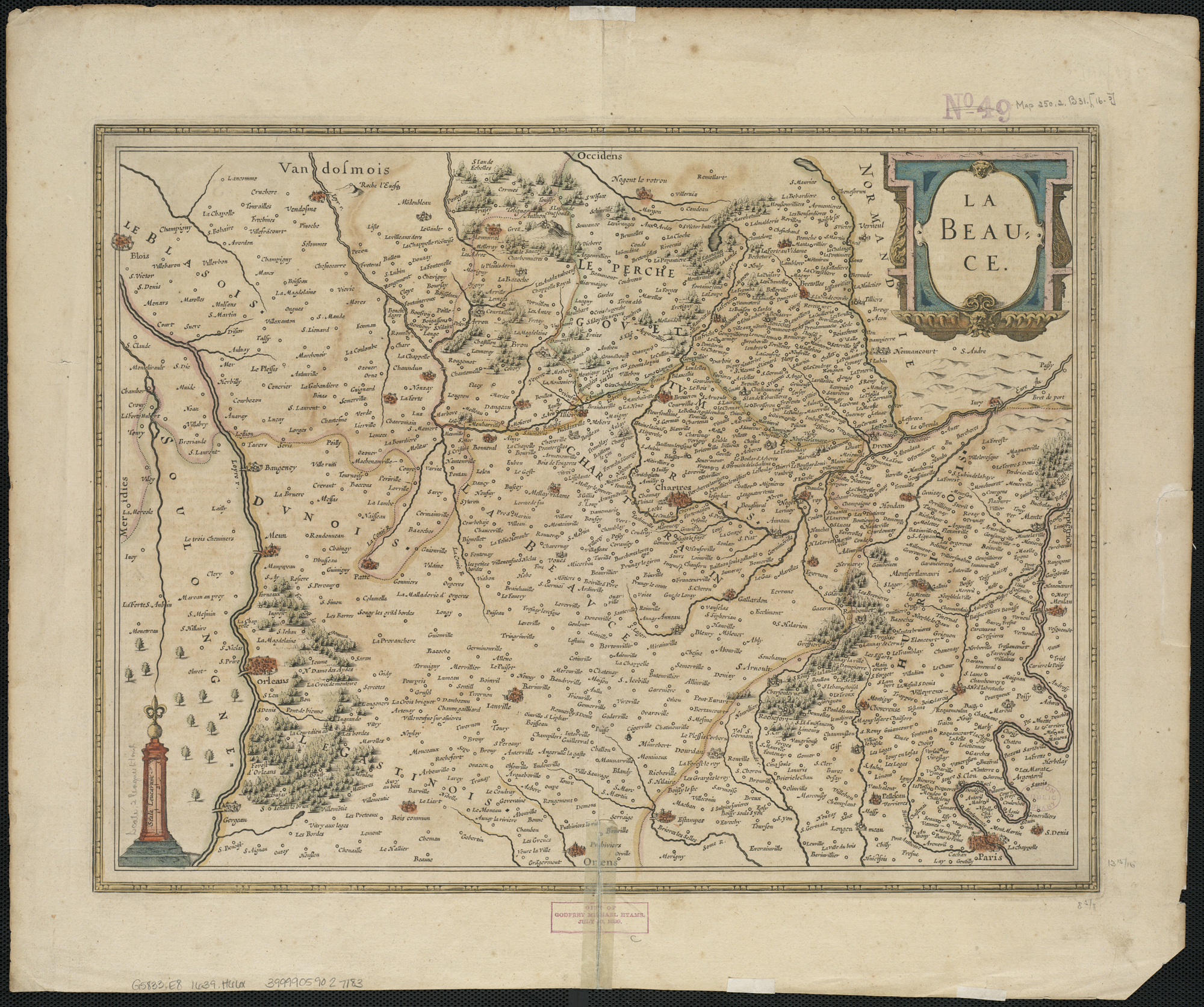
Map of Beauce, 1639

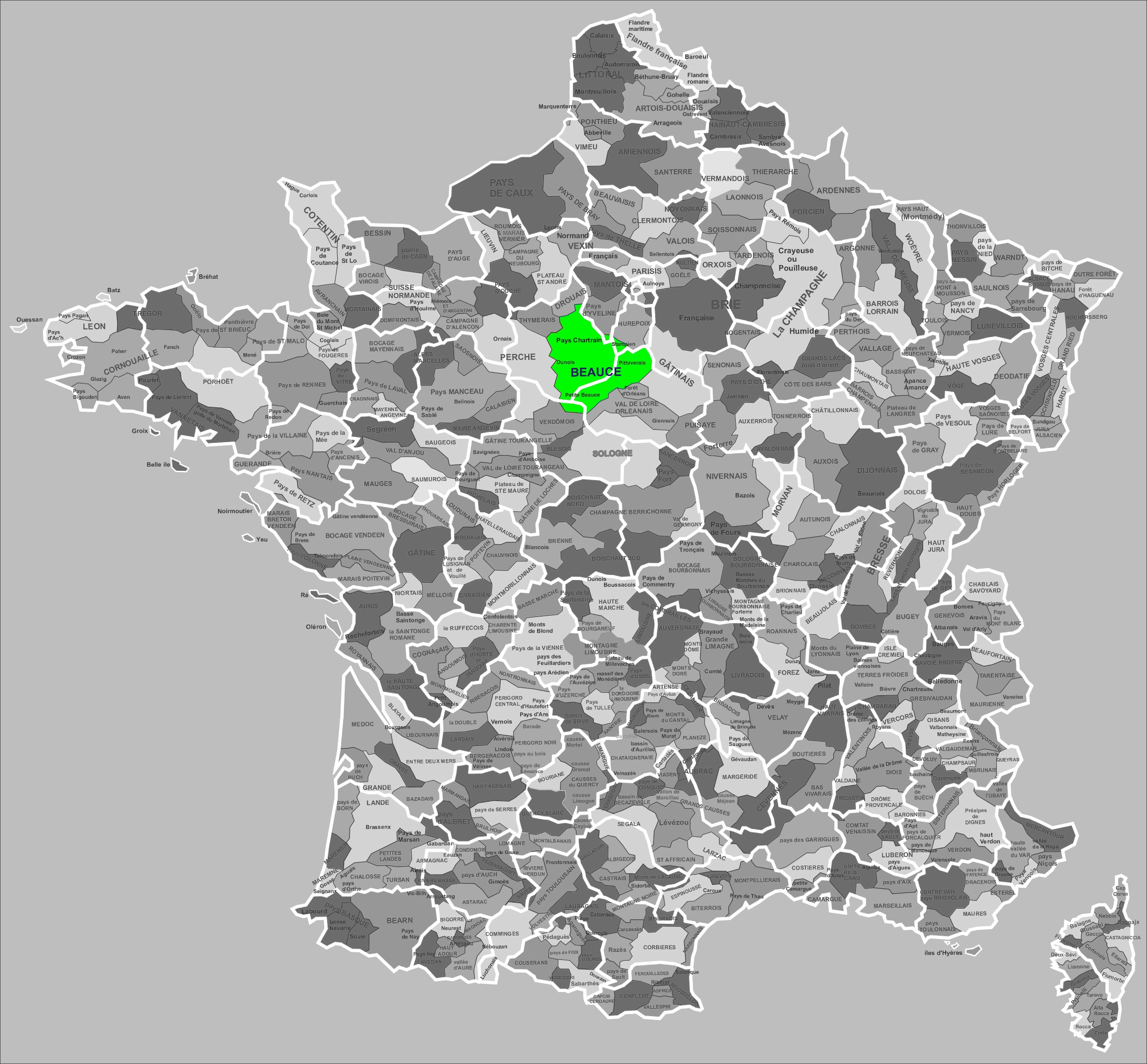
Map of Beauce in modern-day France

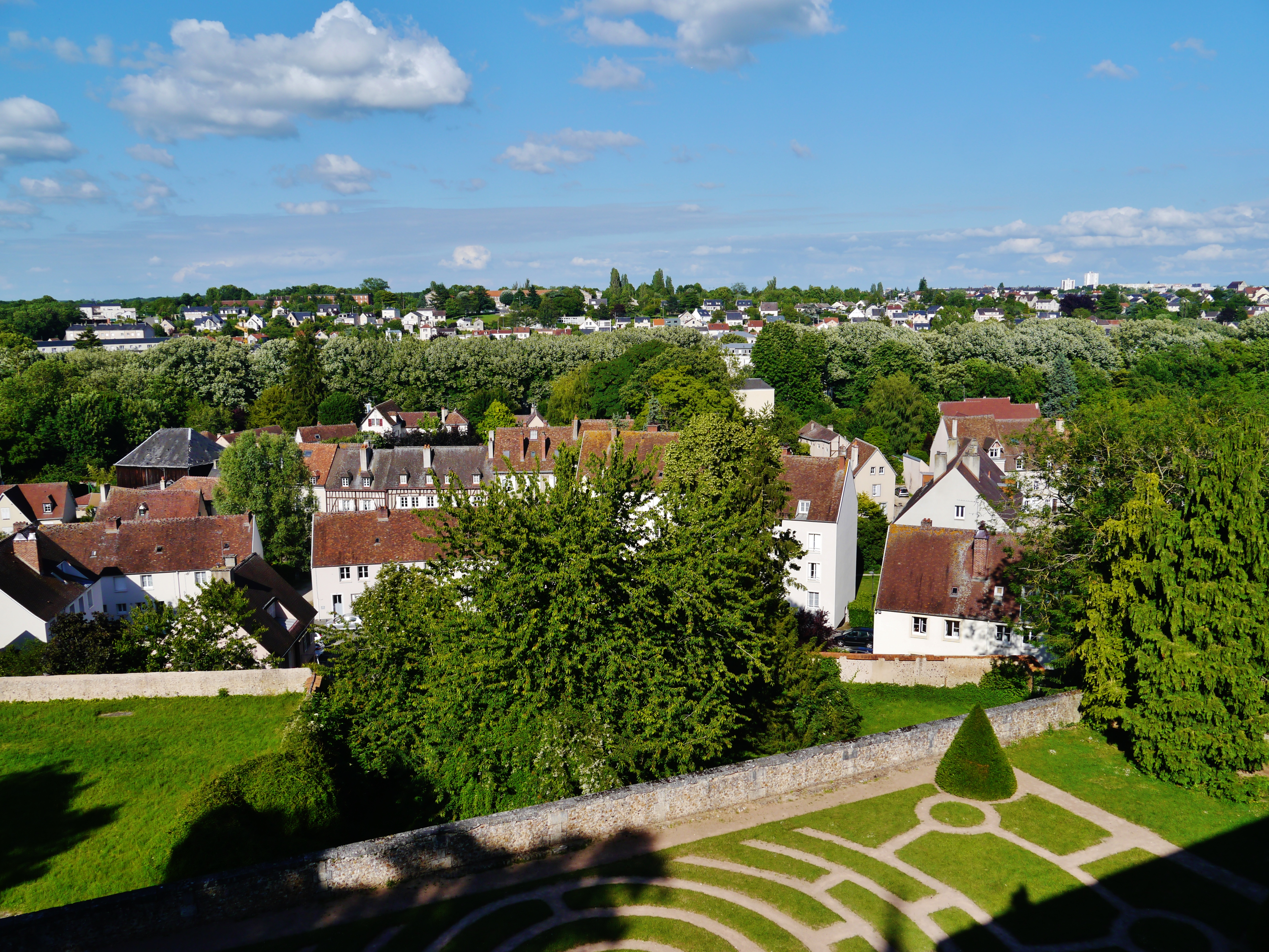
A view of the city of Chartres

Beauce (French pronunciation: [bos]) is a natural region in north-central France, located between the rivers Seine and Loire. It comprises the Eure-et-Loir modern-day department and parts of Loiret, Essonne, and Loir-et-Cher.

The region shared the history of the province of Orléanais and the county of Chartres, which is its sole major city. Beauce is one of France's most productive agricultural areas.

The name derives from Latin Belsia or Belsa, said by Virgilius Maro Grammaticus to be a Gaulish word meaning "grass plain, cultivated plain." It was formerly spelled La Beausse.

It is the setting of Émile Zola's novel La Terre (The Earth), and became inspiration for the backdrop and setting of Louis Clichy's animation Iron Boy.
