= Néron (Isère) =

Mountain in France

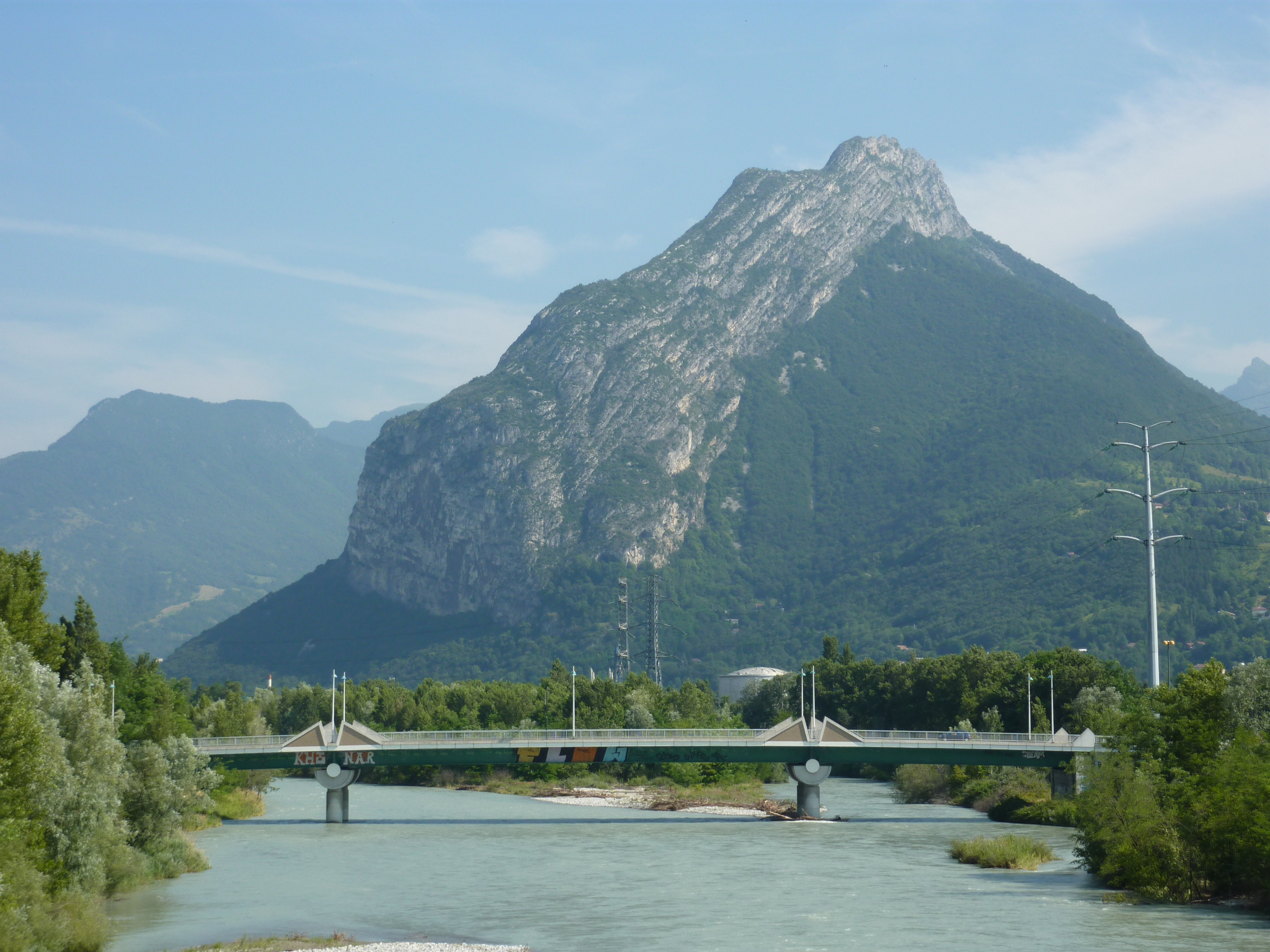
- View of the Néron from the Esclangon Bridge, to the south, crossing the Drac between Grenoble and Fontaine.

Highest point
- Elevation: 1,299 m (4,262 ft)
- Coordinates: 45°14′04″N 5°42′36″E

Geography
- Location: France/Isère
- State: Isère

Geology
- Mountain type: Perched synclinal fold
- Rock type: Limestone

Climbing
- Normal route: path along the ridge from the south

The Néron (French pronunciation: [neʁɔ̃]) is a mountain in the French department of Isère at 1,299 metres in the Chartreuse massif in the Alps. Sometimes called Casque du Néron in the 19th century because of its shape, its name literally means "the black one" and has no connection with the Roman emperor or with the existence of an ancient station used as a lookout and refuge in its southern part. The mountain is shaped like an inverted ship's hull with a very pronounced north–south oriented main ridge and is mainly composed of Urgonian limestone. Due to its exposure, it has a Mediterranean flora, although this has been weakened by the fire in the summer of 2003, which destroyed the entire upper part of the mountain. The mountain is also part of the Chartreuse regional nature park.

The southern end of the Néron is occupied by a cave called Balme de l'Hermitage. The site, occupied since the Neolithic period, was home to a luxurious villa from the Middle Ages onwards, transformed into a castle, which passed in turn into the hands of rich families and religious orders. At that time, the forests on the mountain slopes were intensively exploited to supply charcoal to the foundries and were largely replaced by vineyards. Thus, in the 19th century, the first scientific and military explorers used some of the steep paths made by the loggers. The Néron appeared in Joanne Guides, but the number of victims increased rapidly and it acquired a bad reputation. The first complete crossing from north to south was carried out in 1884 in order to evaluate the possibility of establishing military batteries on the summit of the mountain. Finally, the construction of a road was started in 1891 to lead to the location of the batteries, which were completed two years later to the north of the mountain, upstream of the Vence gorges. At the same time, exploration of the Néron led to the discovery of the ancient Roman pathway and the remains of the ten-metre long ancient footbridge in the south-eastern escarpments. Subsequently, a series of archaeological excavations led by Hippolyte Müller uncovered the cistern of the former lookout and a number of artefacts. New accidents led to the creation of the Dauphinois mountain rescue committee, the beaconing of trails, the laying of cables, and, in 1911, the inauguration of a new footbridge. The Roman path became the main route of the Néron, replacing the unstable corridors of the eastern face and the steep paths of the western slope. The Boujard inn, in the hamlet of l'Hermitage, flourished in the first half of the 20th century. However, the château de la Balme was burnt down in 1932 and abandoned for good. After the Second World War, with the exception of the opening of a few climbing routes around the 1970s and the chronicles generated by a work representing Lucky Luke on one of the summits overlooking the Grenoble area, the Néron lost much of its appeal; municipal by-laws regularly forbade access to it because of rock falls and the dropping of most of the paths.

== Toponymy ==
According to Henri Ferrand (Revue alpine, August 1906), the first mention of Néron goes back to a charter of 1261, preserved in the Departmental Archives of Isère, in the form Neroma de Noyrone. J. Breton also reports the mentions Neyronus and Neuronus. In 1279, the chapter of the collegiate church of Saint-André of Grenoble mentions in one of its publications the "némus situ subtus Neuronem", i.e. "the woods situated at the foot of the Néron". In a text credited by Jean-Pierre Moret de Bourchenu (Histoire du Dauphiné et des princes qui ont porté le nom des Dauphins, 1722) to an agreement held in 1291 between the bishop of Grenoble and the chapter of Saint-André, it is discussed whether the cave of Néron belonged to the parish of Saint-Martin-le-Vinoux: "foramen Rupis Neyronis situm intra farouchiam Sancti Martini" and "foramem dictum Rupis de Neyrone". In the following centuries, various property deeds mention Pascua Neyronis ("the pastures of Néron", 1323), In Neurone (1350) and En Neuron (1687). The name Néron appears for the first time on a map drawn up by Pierre Joseph de Bourcet in the mid-18th century. A few decades later, Jean-Étienne Guettard, in his Mémoires sur la minéralogie du Dauphiné (1782), mentions the Néron range and then the Néron mountain, while maps show the Niéron (1787) or the Néron mountain (1796). Catalogues on the flora of the Dauphiné dwell in turn on the Neyron or again on the Néron. In 1839, Loïs Hermenons mentioned the Sierra du Néron in his "Réminiscences de quelques excursions dans le Dauphiné", published in Le Courrier de l'Isère. Finally, in 1844, the Statistique générale du département de l'Isère mentions the Néron rock and Mount Néron. The name of the mountain is said to come from the local dialect Neiron, derived from neire meaning "the black one", and can be associated with the contemporary French language "Noireau". It would be linked to the dark aspect of its western slope, usually covered with shrubby vegetation. However, the ancient forms are incompatible with this explanation, since they attest to a Neurone form, variously Latinised and with different casual inflections Neuronus, Neuronem, Neurone. Since these forms are repetitive, they are not the result of a misconception, but show that it is probably another name.

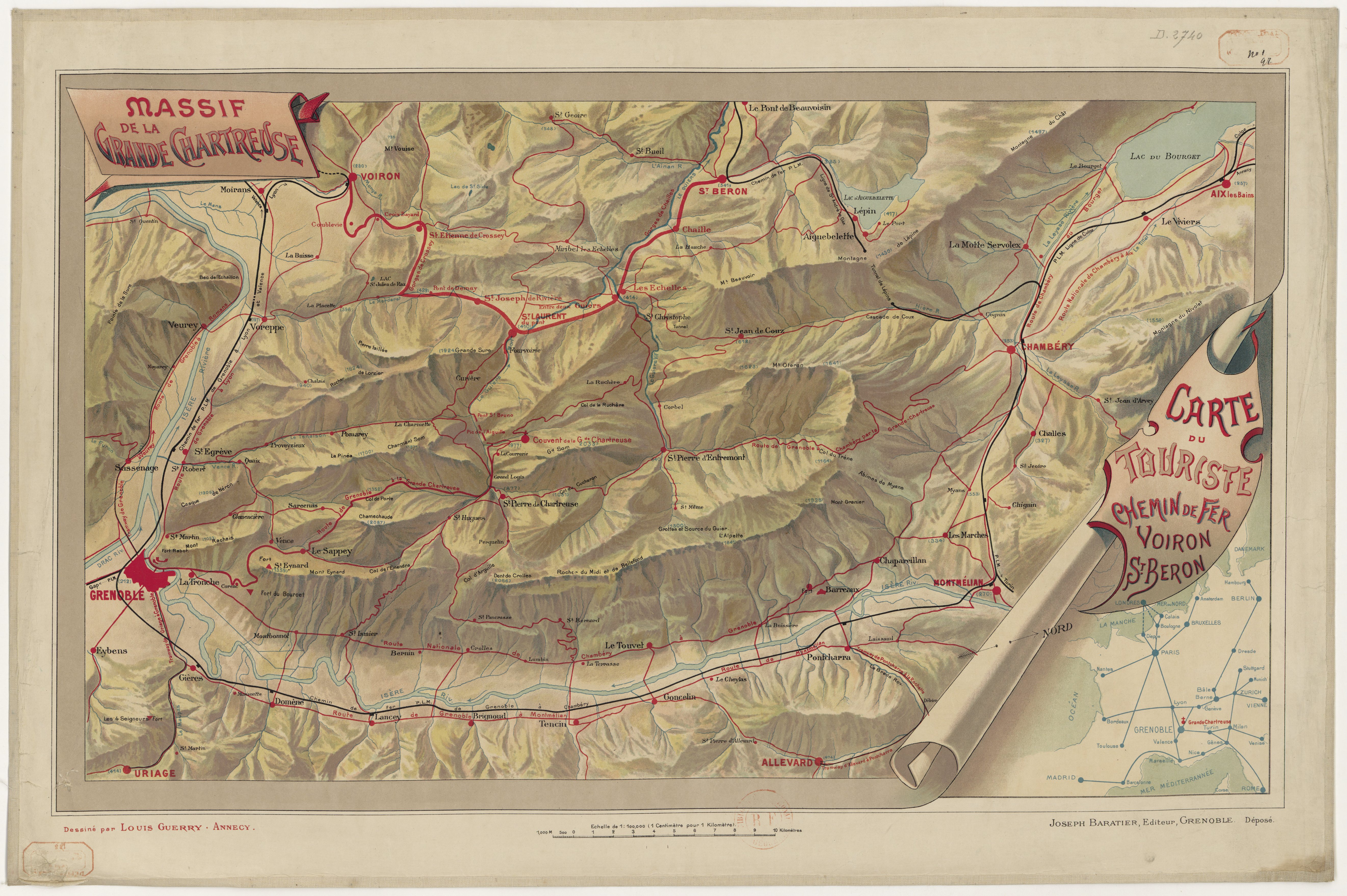
Tourist map of the "Grande Chartreuse massif" in 1897 showing the "Néron helmet".

In 1835, Cassien and Debelle, in L'Album du Dauphiné, wrote: "On the left, the Chartreuse summits, the Aiguille de Saint-Égrève [the Aiguille de Quaix], and the Néron helmet descend in varied contours to the town...". This description was quickly taken up again in 1839 by Loïs Hermenons: "The next morning, as the sun began to shine with a pale reflection on the Helmet of the Néron, the villagers, called to the chapel of Narbonne by the sound of the country bell, found two corpses on whose features rage still breathed." According to Henri Ferrand, "this figure, to which its author certainly did not give any importance, had a great success in the world of the fine spirits and the precious of the time...". Thus, in the same year, in Stendhal's Mémoires d'un touriste, the narrator says, referring to the mountain, "Oh! this helmet, my dear! The successive repetitions of this simple metaphor are the source of the main misunderstanding of the origin of the mountain's name. In fact, in 1853, in his Description pittoresque de la Grande Chartreuse, Auguste Bourne wrongly associated this name with the Roman emperor and wrote "Nero's helmet". Four years later, the Breton Antonin Macé, who had become a professor of history at the University of Grenoble, published a series of articles, notably in the Bulletin officiel des chemins de fer, using this wrong name. It then appeared from 1862 to 1905 in the famous Joanne Guides. It was introduced in 1864 in Charles Lory's Description géologique du Dauphiné. However, in July 1868, Louise Drevet simply pointed out in Le Petit Dauphinois that "seen from Grenoble, it looks like a helmet, always ready to crush the pretty village of La Buisseratte, which is scattered at its feet, with a little good will. In spite of everything, the General Staff map, which until then had been marked Neyron, was corrupted in turn in 1884, as were those of the Geological Research Bureau until 1952, and the regional map of Éléogard Marchand in 1886. The element helmet would be an alteration of break, that is to say a "place of ruins, scree, heaps of large stones" (like the Grande Casse or the Casse Déserte at the Izoard pass). In the magazine La Nature, the saying appears: "The mountain is often crowned with clouds; it is then said in the country that the Néron has its helmet". It was not until the July 17, 1898, issue of the Petit Dauphinois that General Cosseron de Villenoisy finally questioned the accuracy of this name: "Le Casque de Néron is a name imagined, I believe at least, by Joanne, who was the first to use it in her guides to the Dauphiné. This awareness led the Alpine Congress to consider the case of the Néron when it was looking into the "origin of mountain names". The work of Morel-Couprie in 1906 and Ferrand in 1907 finally rendered the term "helmet" inappropriate, even if it would take several years to make it archaic.

The spellings Nez-Rond, in the Joanne Guides of 1877 and 1890, and even Nez-Long were used, but appear to be fanciful, even from the simple point of view of appearance. The images of a reclining woman and a panama hat, during the Belle Époque, or of an overturned ship's hull have also been attached to it.

== Geography ==
=== Location ===
Topographic map of the Néron.

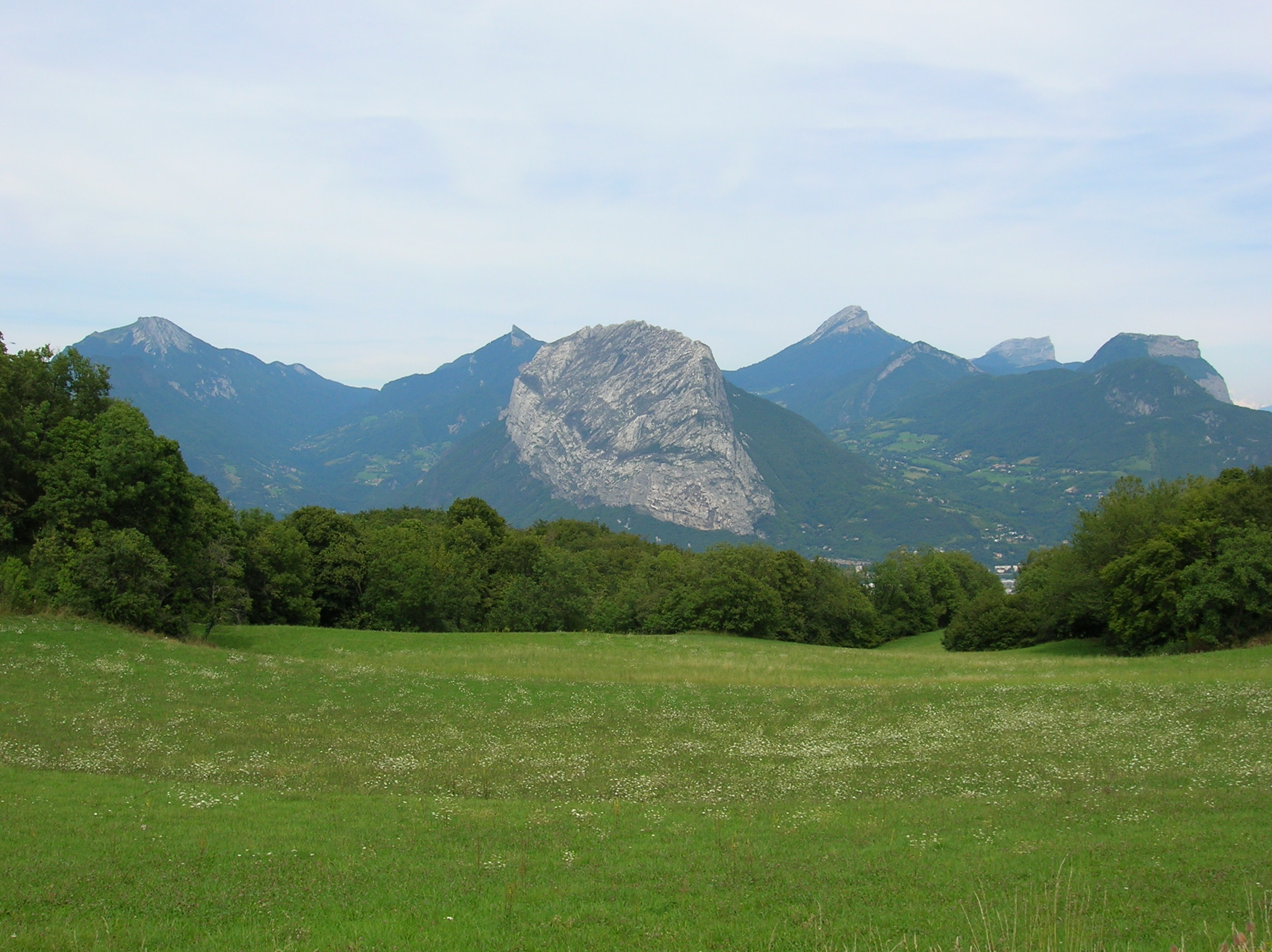
View of the Chartreuse massif with the Néron in the centre, from the heights of Seyssinet-Pariset to the south-west, on the slopes of the Vercors, three years after the fire.

The Néron is located in south-eastern France, in the Auvergne-Rhône-Alpes region and the Isère department. Its main ridge, including its summit, delimits the territory of the communes of Saint-Égrève to the west and Saint-Martin-le-Vinoux to the east and south; the northern slope, from a secondary peak, occupies the territory of Quaix-en-Chartreuse. The mountain dominates part of the Grenoble area and is almost 100 km south-east of Lyon. It belongs to the pre-Alpine range of the Chartreuse and forms the southern end of its median axis.

The mountain is surrounded by the Rachais (1,050m) to the east, the aiguille de Quaix (1,143m) to the north-north-east and the rocher de l'Église (1,300m) to the north-northwest. To the west and south, it overlooks part of the Isère cluse, sometimes called the Sud-Grésivaudan region.

=== Topography ===
The Néron is a strongly individualised mountain. It is separated from the other summits of the Chartreuse by the Col de Clémencières (621 m) to the east and by the gorges of the Vence, a tributary of the Isère, to the north.

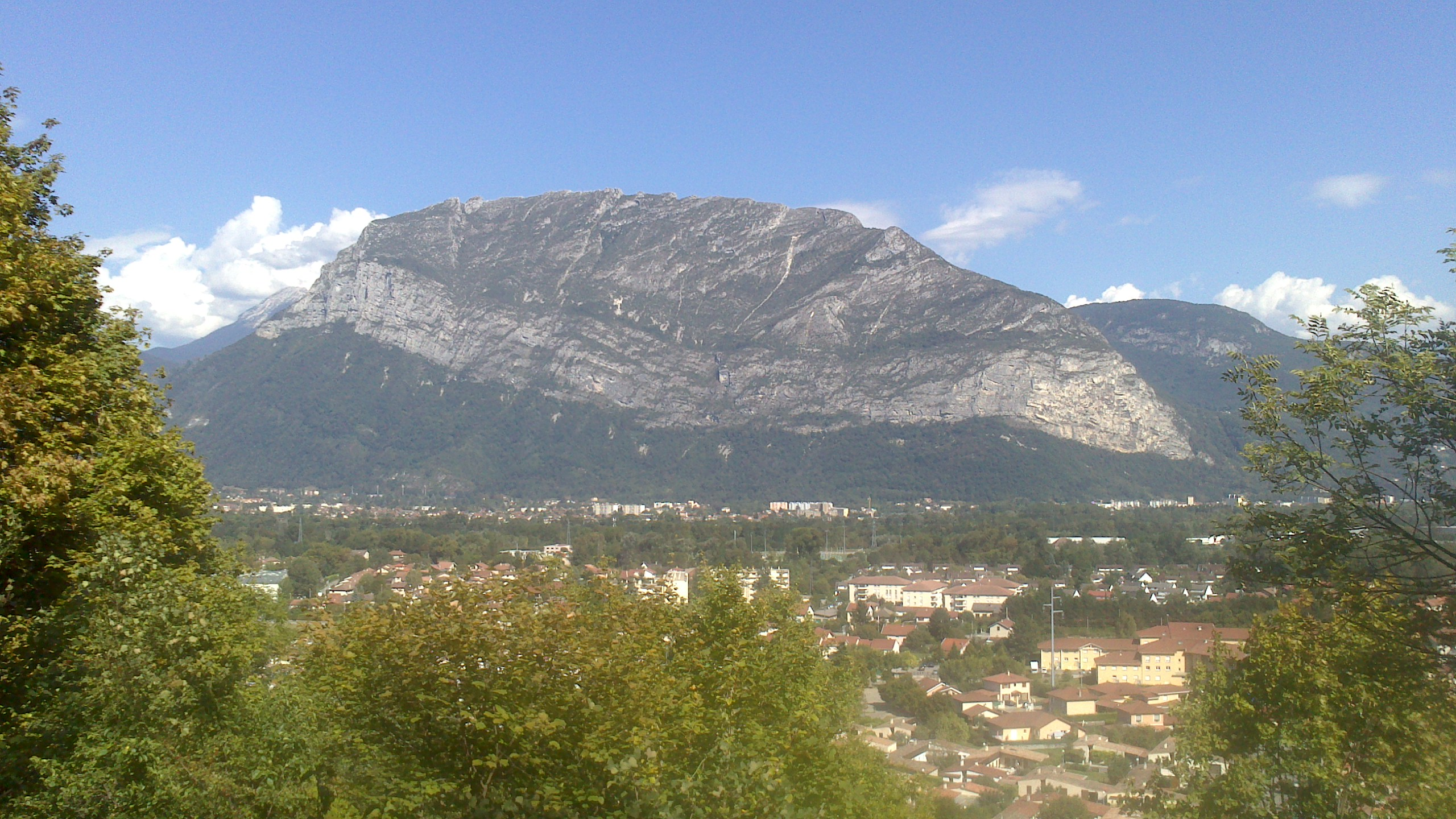
View of the western slope of the Néron from Sassenage.

Seen from the east or west, the mountain has the silhouette of a rounded ridge three to four kilometres long rising towards the north; seen from the south or north, it has a pronounced ridge profile. The western slope has large sloping sides which end in rocky walls dominating the slopes. It is crossed, from north to south (from left to right seen from the valley), by the Ullrich ravine, the Avalanche corridor (named in 1886 after a landslide) and another unnamed scree slope on the IGN maps which has developed strongly since the 2003 fire. The eastern slope is made up of cliffs of 150 to 200 metres in height overhanging scree. These are intersected by four main openings called, from north to south, the Quaix corridor, the Clémencières corridor, the Godefroy corridor and the Z corridor. The main summit, which rises to 1,299 metres, is located between the Ullrich ravine and the Avalanche corridor, approximately at the level of the Godefroy corridor; it is however not very pronounced. The secondary summit, or northern summit formerly known as Croix-Chabert, rises to an altitude of 1,294 metres and forms the northern edge of the gap separating the Ullrich ravine from the Clémencières couloir. The southern end of the mountain, above the hamlet of La Buisseratte, is occupied by a balme visible from certain points in the valley.

== Geology ==
Geological map of the Néron.

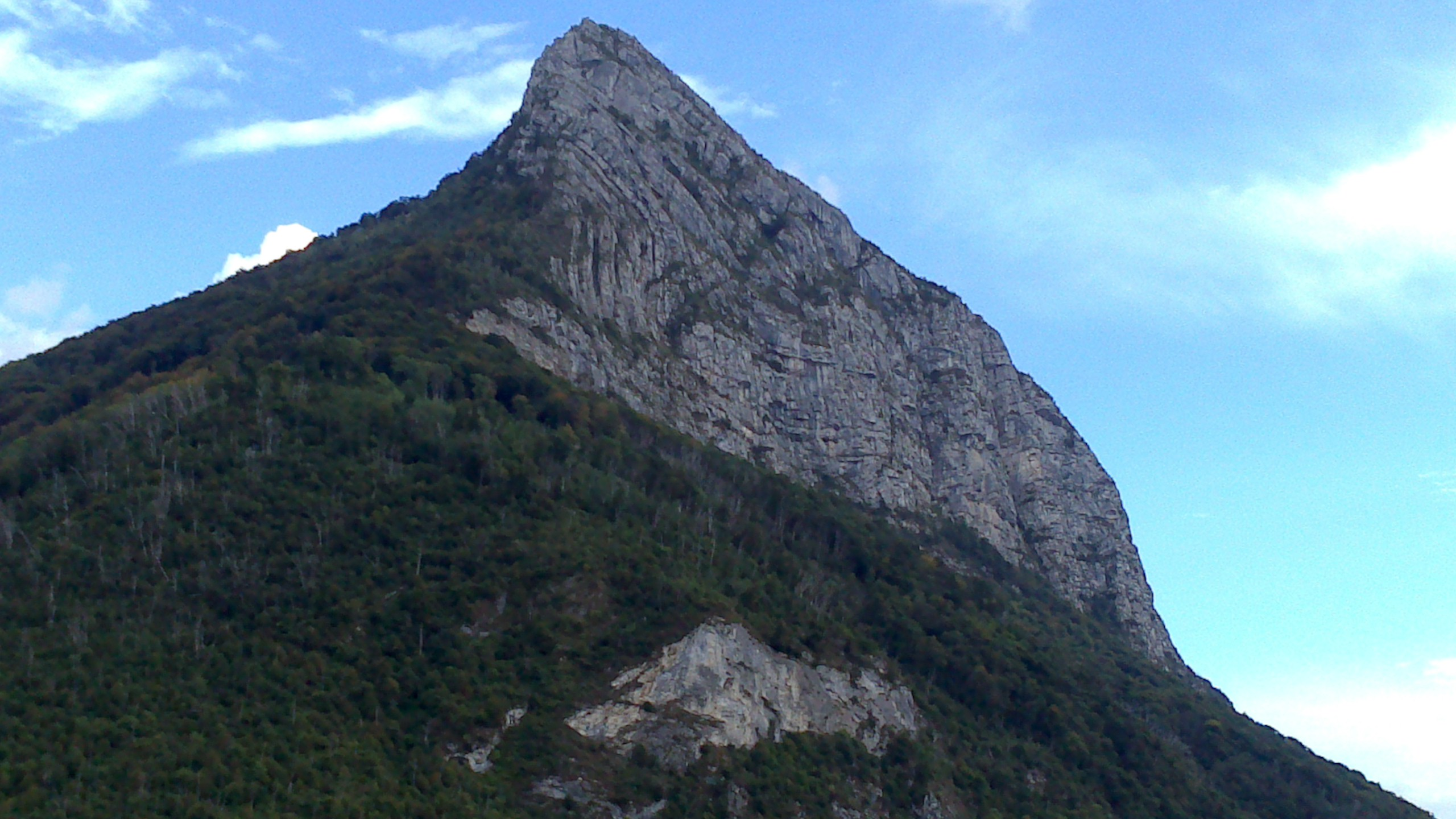
View of the northern end of the Néron limestone ridge showing a secondary anticlinal fold in the main syncline.

The Néron is composed almost exclusively of Lower Cretaceous limestone formed in the Tethys. The closing of this sea followed by the formation of the Alps led, at the beginning of the Miocene, to the formation of a thrust sheet and pushed the sedimentary rocks north-westwards while lifting them. The large, inclined slopes of the western side form a perched syncline with a very hard Urgonian facies, of coral origin, characteristic of the Prealps. It is nested on a fold of Hauterivian limestone, rich in fossils, and Fontanil. To the west, it overlaps the Senonian limestones which were overturned during the folding. The base of the mountain, to the east, is made up of Berriasian marlstone with fossilised ammonites and belemnites. This rock is relatively dark due to the presence of bitumen, and turns white as it oxidises. To the north-west of the Nero, along the course of the Vence, there are molasses and conglomerates of the Miocene.

During the Riss glaciation (around 370,000 to 130,000 years BP), the Néron was entirely covered - or almost (margin of error of twenty metres) - by the Isère glacier, which spread out globally from north-east to south-west. Only the summits 1,299 metres and 1,294 metres have emerged. However, the run-off water has certainly passed over the latter, the northern peak, and has cut the Ullrich ravine downstream on the western slope. During the Würm glaciation (around 125,000 to 11,430 years ago), the surface of the glacier reached an altitude of 1,050 to 1,100 metres at the Clémencières mountain pass. The more rounded appearance of the ridge and the presence of sheep-like rocks below the southern shoulder at 1,007 metres show that secondary glacial erosion took place at this time. In addition, the wide corridor on the west face, which originates over a hundred metres wide between the 1,007 metre and 1,100 metre humps, is the result of a massive flow of lateral glacial water towards the depths of the glacier. They are enlarged by runoff water that is pushed towards the right bank by glacial confluences at the level of the Grenoble umbilicus. The glaciers left several erratic blocks on the western slope of the Néron; moraines are also present all along the eastern piedmont, at the level of the Monta and between the Muret and the Buisseratte on the western piedmont.

=== Weather ===
The Chartreuse massif is subject to an oceanic mountain climate. It acts as a barrier to the prevailing westerly winds from the Atlantic Ocean and thus receives a large amount of rainfall, with a peak in early spring and another in early autumn. One third of this precipitation comes in the form of snow. As a result, the depth of the snow cover at the Porte Pass (1,326 m, comparable to the summit of Nero) is around one metre at the end of February, but reached record heights of 200 to 230 centimetres for the same period in 1979, 1982, and 1985. However, the average snow cover, which has halved over the last fifty years, has been measured at an average of fifty centimetres over the last ten years during the winter. Thus, since the 2000s, snow has remained on average 150 days per year at the Porte pass, i.e. thirty days less than in the 1960s; the presence of a snow cover greater than one metre has fallen by fifteen days every ten years on average over the same period. This observation coincides with an increase in temperature of 1.4 °C over the last half century, from December 1 to April 30.

=== Fauna and flora ===
Deer, wild boar and foxes occupy the Néron woods. Two bird species protected under the European directive are present: the Short-toed Eagle and the Peregrine Falcon.

One plant is likely to be the subject of prefectural protection, the spiked polysticks, a species of fern. Other plant species include: Wolfsbane, Montpellier's Capillary, Straight-leaved Larkspur, Rock Larkspur, Scabrous Larkspur, Linnaean Argyrolobe, White Mugwort, Narrow-leaved Asparagus, Carillonian Bellflower, Narrow-leaved Centranthe, Sumac fustet, Alpine Daphne, Alpine Carnation, Broad-leaved Fusain, Woody Jasmine, Thuriferous Juniper, Deadheaded Limodora, Bee Ophrys, White Strawberry, Terebinth Pistachio, Southern Polypodium, Nice Ornament, Small-flowered Silenium, Autumn Spiranthus, and Pond Stipe.

Map of the natural botanical habitat in Nero according to a study conducted in 1915.

A "botanical study of the Néron mountain" was carried out in 1915 by J. Breton and J. de la Brosse. Although it has been rendered partly obsolete by the fire of the summer of 2003, it has nevertheless revealed the existence of several plant zones, including a southern flora. To the north and north-east of the mountain, from the Batteries at Ripaillère to the large corridors, there is a zone of beech trees associated with lime trees; the presence of Scots pine, white fir and common chestnut is also noted in these forests, while species adapted to cool, damp soils, such as the Eagle fern, the Black dandelion, the Fountain asplenium, the Green capillary or the Perennial mercurial cover the undergrowth. The south-east of the mountain, from Gatinet to Narbonne, is occupied by the zone of oaks associated in the dry calcareous soils with junipers and in the wet marls with Eagle Ferns and chestnut trees. Below these two zones, below 650 metres in altitude, in the land formerly planted with vines, is the so-called truffle zone; It is occupied to the south by hazelnut, oak, juniper, lime, blackthorn, Aleppo pine, Scots pine, corm tree, thorny hawthorn and white alisier, which can give the black truffle, while to the north grow birch, poplar and willow, which can give the white summer truffle or even the musk truffle. Nevertheless, the most remarkable zone according to Breton and Brosse is that of the southern plants, present in the rocks and dry grasslands of the south-facing slopes, essentially from the Hermitage to the Néron meadow, but extending as far as the Buisseratte and the Fontaine Vierge on the one hand and the Roman post on the other. This is the preferred area for boxwood and, to a lesser extent, the Thuriferous Juniper and the Pistachio Terebinth, some of which could reach six metres each and were exploited for their wood, as well as the Buckthorn. They also list Montpellier's Maple, Bigleaf Maple, Rock Æthionemia, Large-flowered Snapdragon, Linnaean Argyrolobe, Branching Asphodel, Montpellier's Astragale, Madrid Brome, Red Brome, Bellflower, Blue Cupid, Panicle Centaury, Narrow-leaved Centranthus, Common Meadow-rue, Tree Baguenaudium, Dwarf Coronilla, Fumana vulgaris, Spach's helianthemum, oblique bedstraw, glossy bedstraw, perennial lettuce, scented laser, laser siler, toadflax, narrow-leaved flax, Etrurian Honeysuckle, Ciliated Meadow-rue, Very Slender Bugrass, White Strawberry, Toadflax, Travelling Madder, Montpellier Soapwort, Nice Toadflax and Pondweed. This area was the hardest hit by the fire in the summer of 2003.

== History ==
=== From Antiquity to Modern Age ===
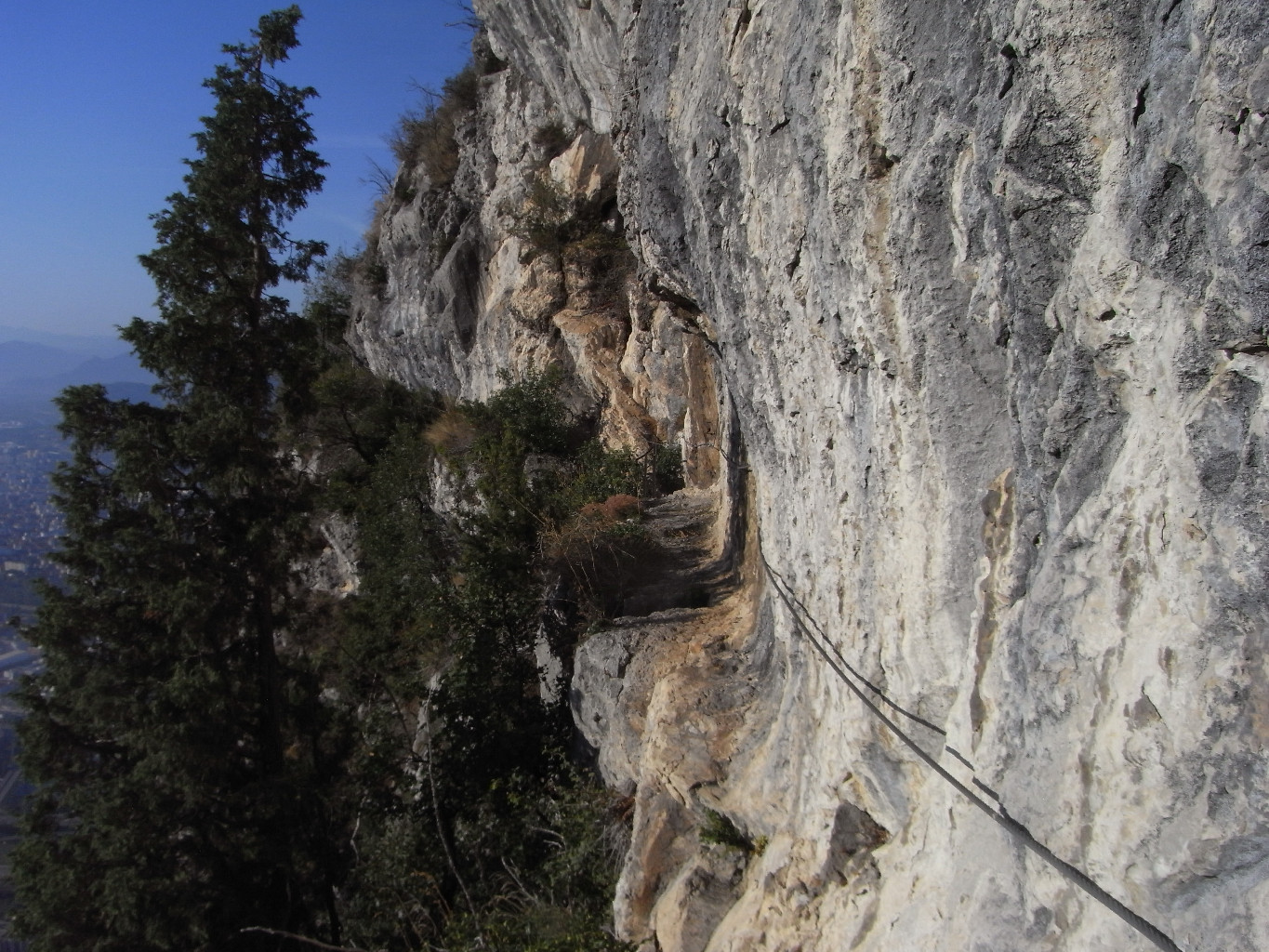
Contemporary view of the corbelled Roman road with cables; the Hippolyte Müller footbridge can be seen in the centre of the photo.

Walls were built around the ancient city of Cularo (Grenoble) at the end of the 2nd century, under the joint reigns of the Roman emperors Diocletian and Maximian, in order to guard against barbarian invasions. As the surrounding villages had no such fortifications, the inhabitants decided to build shelters in the mountains. This is how the southern end of the Néron ridge and the Hermitage mountain range, at its foot, came to be occupied in times of unrest. The high post, a natural platform 150 metres long and 40 metres wide at an altitude of about 750 metres, attracted the attention of the governor of Cularo, who saw it as an impregnable sentinel over the Isère valley. The Roman engineers considered it suitable for the establishment of a lookout ensuring communication by smoke signals. They then built a mule track between Narbonne and the escarpments on the eastern slope, then cut a narrow path corbelled into the rock with picks and pins. Several workers, suspended in the air by a rope in order to speed up the work, died. A temporary footbridge was built to cross a gap and transport the materials. The upper part of the path, up to the Roman post, was completed. A new footbridge, with a defensive function, was built; it rested on beams wedged into mortises cut into the rock and its deck was made of stringers, while its upstream end was blocked by a gate and two guards. The platform for the Roman post was cleared and levelled. A cistern fourteen metres long, seven metres wide and two to three and a half metres deep was dug; it was sealed with a mortar of fat lime and crushed stone, and then probably covered with a wooden roof covered with tiles. The water collected by its gutters and those of the roofs of the surrounding buildings is used to feed the basin. The floor of the houses is in turn covered with mortar and bricks are used for paving.In spite of everything, this post remained little occupied, except around 352-353 when Magnentius was defeated by Constance II at the battle of Mons Seleucus (around La Bâtie-Montsaléon in the Hautes-Alpes), in 383 when Gratian was assassinated at Lugdunum after his defeat at the battle of Lutetia and his rout, and in 413 when the Gallo-Roman usurper Jovin was captured at Valence by the Visigoth king Athaulf. On each occasion, the population took cover to avoid the bands of fugitives who were pillaging.

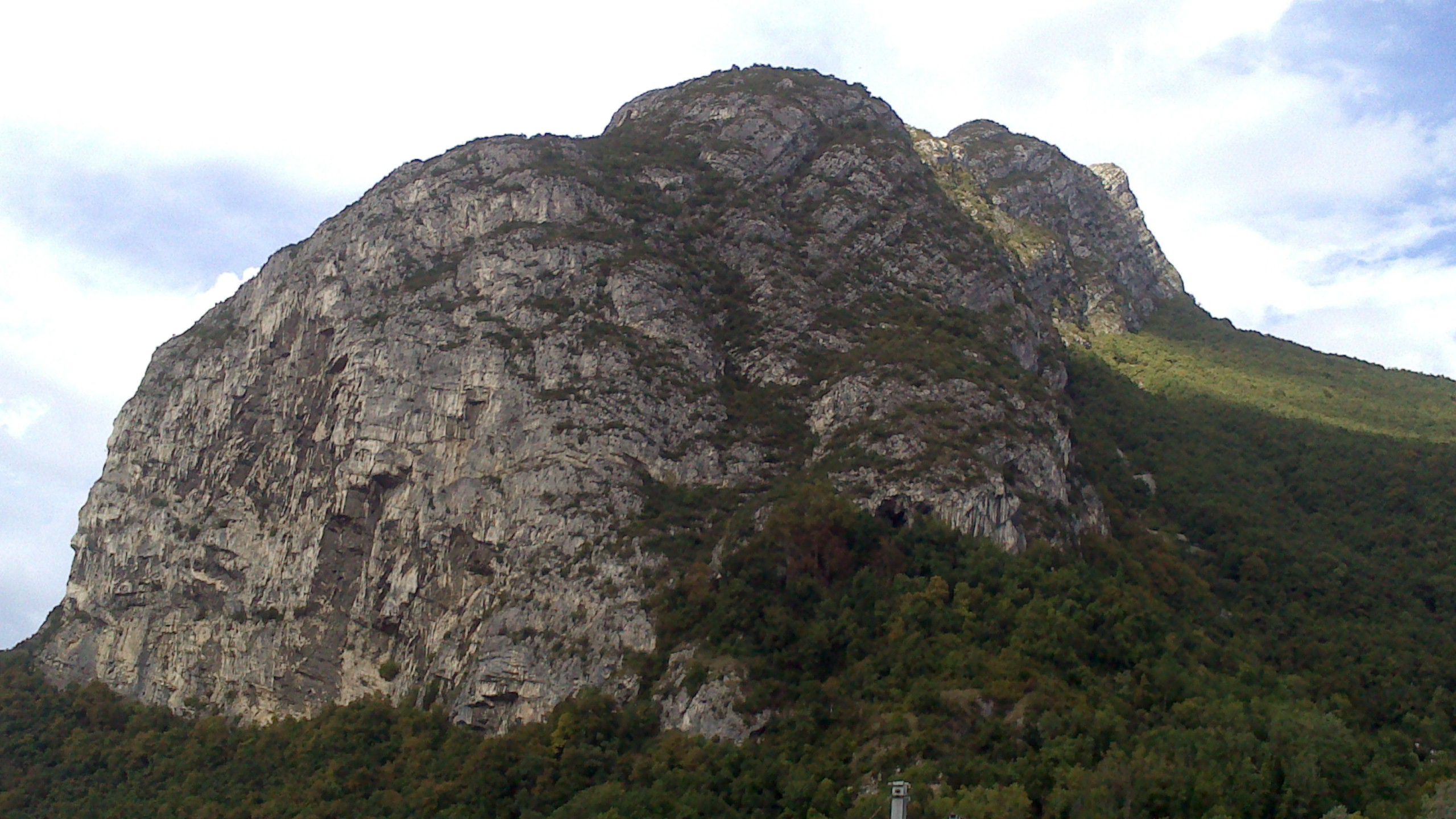
View of the southern end of the Néron from the hamlet of La Buisseratte, with the balme de l'Hermitage at the bottom right of the rocky walls.

When the Goths were victorious, the inhabitants took refuge either within the city walls of Gratianopolis (the new name for Cularo) with their livestock, or once again on the mountain. Later, in the High Middle Ages, the Grésivaudan, which was not very prosperous and not very strategic, was relatively spared from invasion. Thus, between the peaceful arrival of the Burgundians in the middle of the 5th century and the transalpine conquests of Charlemagne in the second half of the 7th century, the existence of the refuges was forgotten. The Roman road was destroyed by weather and vegetation, and the footbridge collapsed. The Néron became inaccessible again. The existence of a Chaorce villa at the Balme, or pertuis du Néron, at the foot of the walls at the southern end of the mountain, is attested in 1044 as the seat of a mandement. The first mention of the castle of La Balme as such appears at the beginning of the 11th century in the charters of Bishop Hugues de Grenoble. One of its most important owners was Jarenton de la Balme, who collected a large part of the taxes on this fief. The descendants of this family are mentioned until the end of the following century. The estate has a private chapel. The vineyards were already producing a wine similar to Marsala. It was briefly acquired by Siboud de Châteauneuf, Lord of Bouqueron, in Corenc, before being sold in 1283 to Guillaume III de Royn. The latter wished to turn it into a fortified house and country residence for the bishops of Grenoble, not without triggering a quarrel with the co-lord of Saint-Martin-le-Vinoux and the collegiate church of Saint-André, and even the dauphin himself. However, once the disputes had been settled, the successors to the bishopric gradually abandoned the Néron tunnel in favour of the Plaine tunnel, which had become the Bon Pasteur convent in Saint-Martin-d'Hères; the castle of La Balme gradually fell into ruin. As a property of the Church, it was given to Urbain Fléard on November 16, 1592, after an edict by Henry IV. His heiress bequeathed it to Jean du Faure, co-lord of Saint-Martin-le-Vinoux. It was then occupied for some time by Jacques Magnin and Madelein Mansuel, who lived there as hermits. On the death of his father, Jean-Benoît du Faure sold the estate on April 30, 1621, for 250 pounds to the order of the Discalced Hermits of Saint-Augustin of Villard-Benoît, in Pontcharra. They completely renovated the buildings and turned them into the Hermitage convent. It covers 142 m^{2} and three levels: the cellars and the press on the ground floor to exploit the grapes they grow, five common rooms and the Notre-Dame chapel on the first floor, a large hall and nine cells on the second. They also acquired various plots of land, mainly wooded, to reach almost nine hectares. In 1632, they obtained a plot of land in the meadow of the Treasury to build a church and a convent. Although a papal bull from Innocent X, in the middle of the 17th century, confirmed the possession of the estate at the Hermitage, it was abandoned; at first, only a father and two brothers remained there, and then, from the beginning of the 18th century, only a brother and a servant were responsible for the farm. In 1768, Jean-Jacques Rousseau and the lawyer Gaspard Bovier, with whom he was staying, saw the convent during one of their walks. The French Revolution put an end to the occupation of the Augustinians.

In the first half of the 11th century, the forge appeared in the region through the Carthusian monks for the Crusades. They obtained iron ore from the Charmette Pass. To supply a single furnace with charcoal, it is necessary to exploit 2,000 hectares of Chartreuse forest each year. Many woodcutters and charcoal makers worked illegally. Towards the middle of the 14th century, the most accessible areas were exhausted and it was decided to close the forges at Quaix and Proveysieux; only the one at La Monta in Saint-Égrève was kept. In the 17th century, the forest was already being exploited on the steep western slopes of the Néron, vioules (steep paths) were made over the escarpments in the continuation of the mule tracks, and tracks were opened up using the "stuffing" technique: heavy bundles of wood were thrown up the slope and broke the trees in their path, which were then recovered downstream. After the French Revolution, logging became less intense.

In the Middle Ages, vines were everywhere around the Néron, whether in Saint-Martin-le-Vinoux on the southern slopes, where the wine is quoted in a guide as being of good quality and sold at a significant price, or on the hillsides, as in the hamlet of l'Autre-Côté-de-Vence. They are creeping, require little maintenance and are long-lasting. In the 17th century, the most beautiful and most prolific belonged to the monks, but everyone had their own acre. The publication of the harvest season gave rise to village ceremonies and festivals.

One of Grenoble's four leprosy establishments, first called the maladrerie de la Balme and then the maladière de la Boysseracte, also existed from the 13th to the 17th century at the foot of the Néron, at La Buisseratte. The patients maintained fields, orchards and vineyards on the lower slopes of the mountain. The plague appeared as early as 1523. Entire families were isolated outside the village, in huts in the forest, in order to curb the epidemic. It was at this time that herbalists began to travel the Neron and discovered southern plants. The plague appeared as early as 1523. Entire families were isolated outside the village, in huts in the forest, in order to curb the epidemic. It was at this time that herbalists began to travel the Neron and discovered southern plants.

=== Contemporary attendance ===
The first known victim of the Néron was Jeanne Gaude, a young shepherdess who killed herself while guarding her goats and sheep above the Hermitage in 1754. In 1816, Colonel Brun, a banished conspirator, took refuge in the cave that now bears his name at the northern end of the ridge. In 1835, the company Voisin, Gérardin, Riondet et Fils was created to exploit a Berriasian limestone quarry near the hamlet of La Rivoire, in the south-east of the mountain, for the manufacture of cement known as "de la Porte de France".

Thouvenel carried out topographical surveys in August 1776, but the first wave of exploration of the Néron took place between 1836 and 1839. The scientists and soldiers were accompanied either by Galle, from Quaix-en-Chartreuse, or by Garrel, from the hamlet of Muret in Saint-Égrève. In 1858, Adolphe Clopin, aged 25, who had climbed the mountain with his two brothers, died on the way down. Several newspapers reported the incident in the days and years that followed. In 1862, the first collection of the Joanne Guides, founded a few years earlier by Adolphe Joanne, who worked because of his friendships in Saint-Égrève so that the Néron would be included among the races contained in the book, mentions:

"A very difficult and dangerous route, which we mention here only to dissuade tourists from undertaking it. [...] Its steep sides seem inaccessible; it can be climbed, however, but only at one point. [...] Besides, this ascent offers no other reward than the puerile satisfaction of having triumphed over a natural difficulty, apparently impossible to overcome. [...] From the hamlet of Narbonne, one goes obliquely through the meadows and coppices towards a point situated roughly in the middle of the mountain (in the direction of its length) and indicated by the yellowish hue of the rocks. This is the only path leading to the ridge, which is very narrow and so steep everywhere else that it is inaccessible. Several young people who undertook this climb a few years ago died on the way down, which was much more dangerous than the climb up"

— Guides Joanne

In the second half of the 19th century, Émile Viallet repeated the ascent on numerous occasions, while the routes became more varied. The first complete crossing of the Néron ridges was probably the work of Gambiez, captain of the Grenoble Engineers and member of the French Alpine Club, and of Lelong, member of the Société des touristes du Dauphiné, in 1884. Gambiez was commissioned to carry out reconnaissance in order to establish batteries on the heights of the Néron to complete the fortifications designed by Cosseron de Villenoisy. Lelong reports that the mountain already had a bad reputation at the time because of lost walkers and even deaths. Gambiez made a first approach from the Muret, at the foot of the western slope, on October 29. Finally, on November 6, the two friends set off from the hamlet of l'Autre-Côté-de-Vence, at the north-eastern end of the mountain, in Quaix. They were accompanied by Father Galle, his nephew Marius Giraud, who acted as porter, and two other anonymous persons. Lelong reports that the mountain already had a bad reputation at the time because of lost walkers and even deaths. Gambiez made a first approach from the Muret, at the foot of the western slope, on October 29. Finally, on November 6, the two friends set off from the hamlet of l'Autre-Côté-de-Vence, at the north-eastern end of the mountain, in Quaix. They were accompanied by Father Galle, his nephew Marius Giraud, who acted as porter, and two other anonymous persons. They climbed the " Cheminée de Quaix ", probably the Clémencières corridor. Father Galle and Marius Giraud left them after having indicated the route to follow. The crossing from north to south, as far as the hamlet of Narbonne, in Saint-Martin-le-Vinoux, took eleven and a half hours. Gambiez and Lelong each wrote an account at the end of their expedition which illustrated the technical difficulties of the mountain; Gambiez rejected the possibility of installing batteries on the ridge and explained the various alternatives in relation to the existing structures. On March 26, 1891, René Godefroy, also an officer in the Engineers, climbed the corridor that bears his name for the first time, on the route that would long be known as the "Royal Way of Néron". The construction of the route des Batteries was launched the same year by the company E. Machot company, starting from the hamlet of Ripaillère, for a length of approximately 2.5 kilometres. It was supervised by Battalion Chief Faure of the 14th Grenoble Engineer Corps. A railway was set up along the edge of the road to evacuate the earthworks.

It was on this occasion, also on March 26, that Captain Delahet discovered the old Roman road and the remains of the ancient ten-metre long footbridge in the south-eastern escarpments of the mountain. The gap it crossed was first traversed four years later by Flusin and Chaumat, then by Thorant and Dodero. In 1893, the archaeologist Hippolyte Müller discovered artefacts from the Neolithic, Bronze Age, Roman and Burgundian periods on the property of F. de Villenoisy at the Balme de l'Hermitage. On May 15, 1898, after four years of research, the scientist discovered the cistern of the Roman post at Rencurel Meadow, probably named after the shepherd who once occupied it, at the southern end of the ridge. New series of excavations, carried out over a dozen years at the post and on the Roman road, brought to light numerous fragments of tiles, broken glass, scrap metal (nails, rings, knife blades, fragments of armour), pottery, ceramics, coins, including a bronze of Claudius II, shoemaking tools and other metal objects, but also a quartzite crusher dating from before the Roman period. They lead to the discovery of the skeleton of a probable worker who died by accident while digging the wall.

The Néron battery was completed in 1893, after two years of work carried out by the Fayolle Joseph company and the military engineers, at around 713 metres altitude at the northern end of the mountain. The materials were transported by the railway line used to build the road. The battery completes the defensive system of the Saint-Eynard fort. Because of its location, it has no defence perimeter. It has six gun locations, a two-storey barracks building for an officer, three non-commissioned officers and 52 soldiers, and a tunnel with gunpowder, fireworks and ammunition shops with two workshops. Water is supplied by a cistern. At the beginning of the First World War, the artillery consisted of six 120 mm L model 1878 guns aimed two by two at Saint-Égrève, the hamlet of Le Gua in Proveysieux and Sarcenas. Electrification was planned in order to communicate by telegraph.

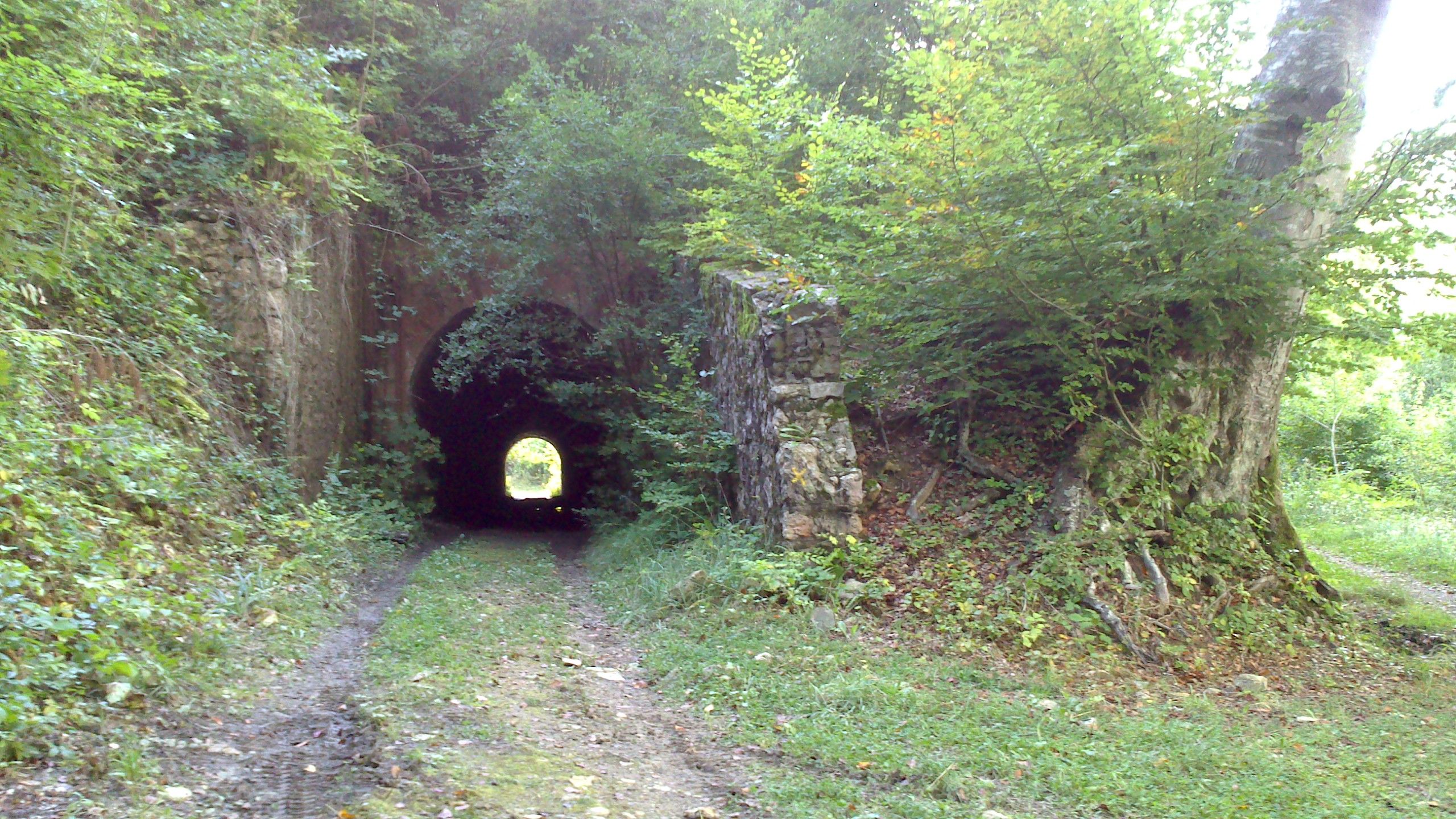
View of the south-east entrance to the tunnel, bypassed on the right by a path.

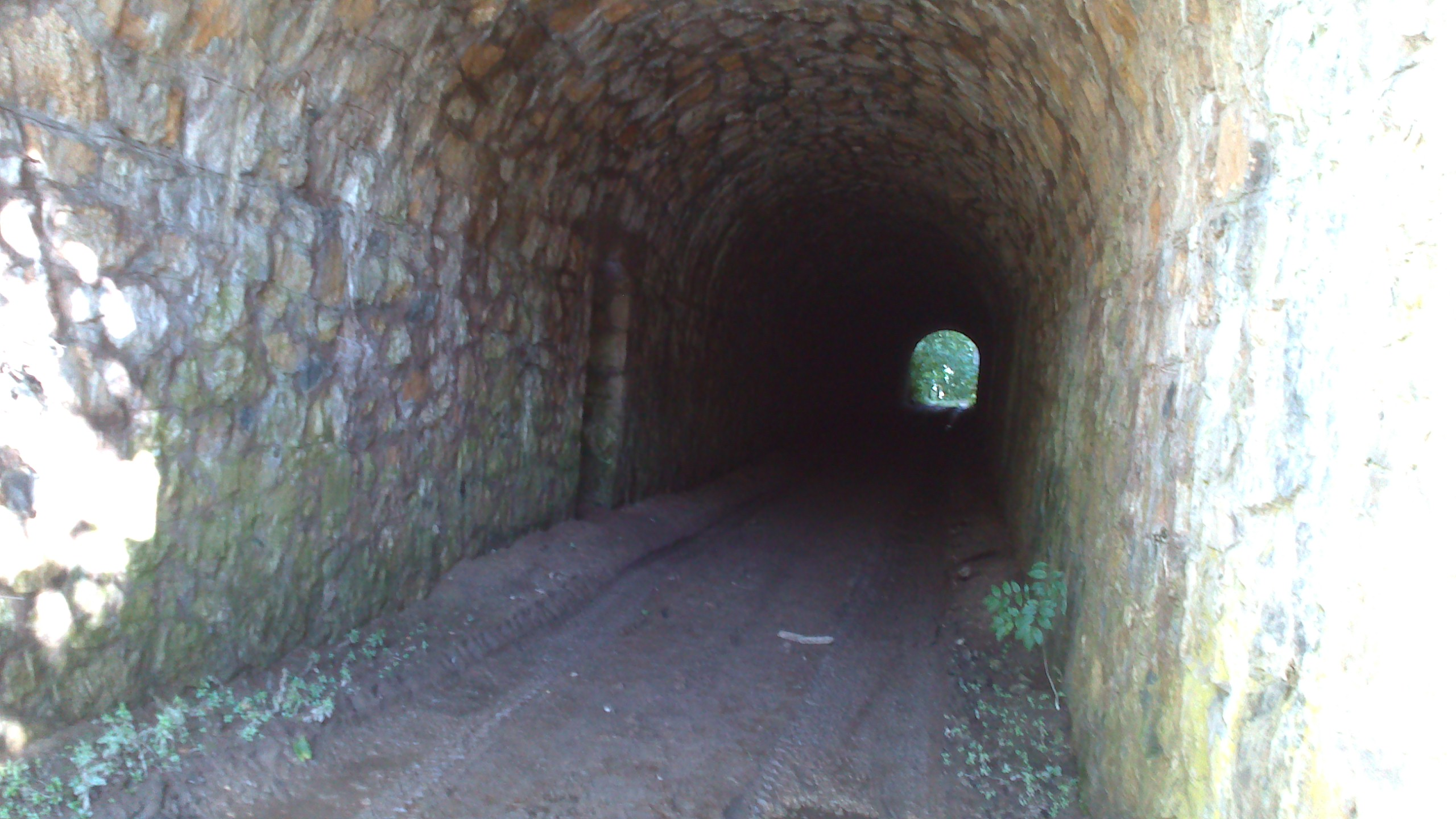
View of the north-western entrance to the tunnel; the niche visible on the left is the ammunition shop.

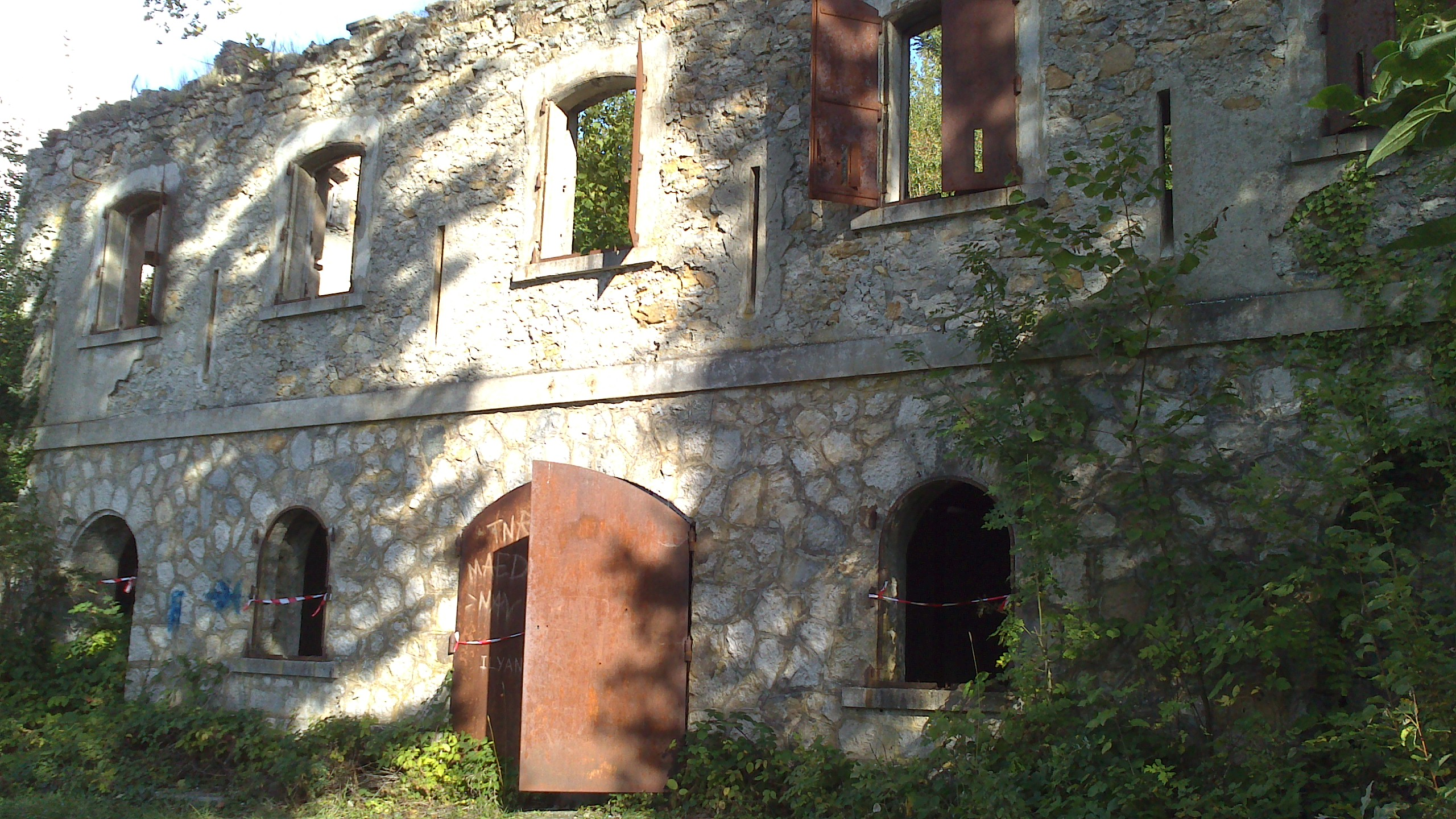
View of the north façade of the barracks building.

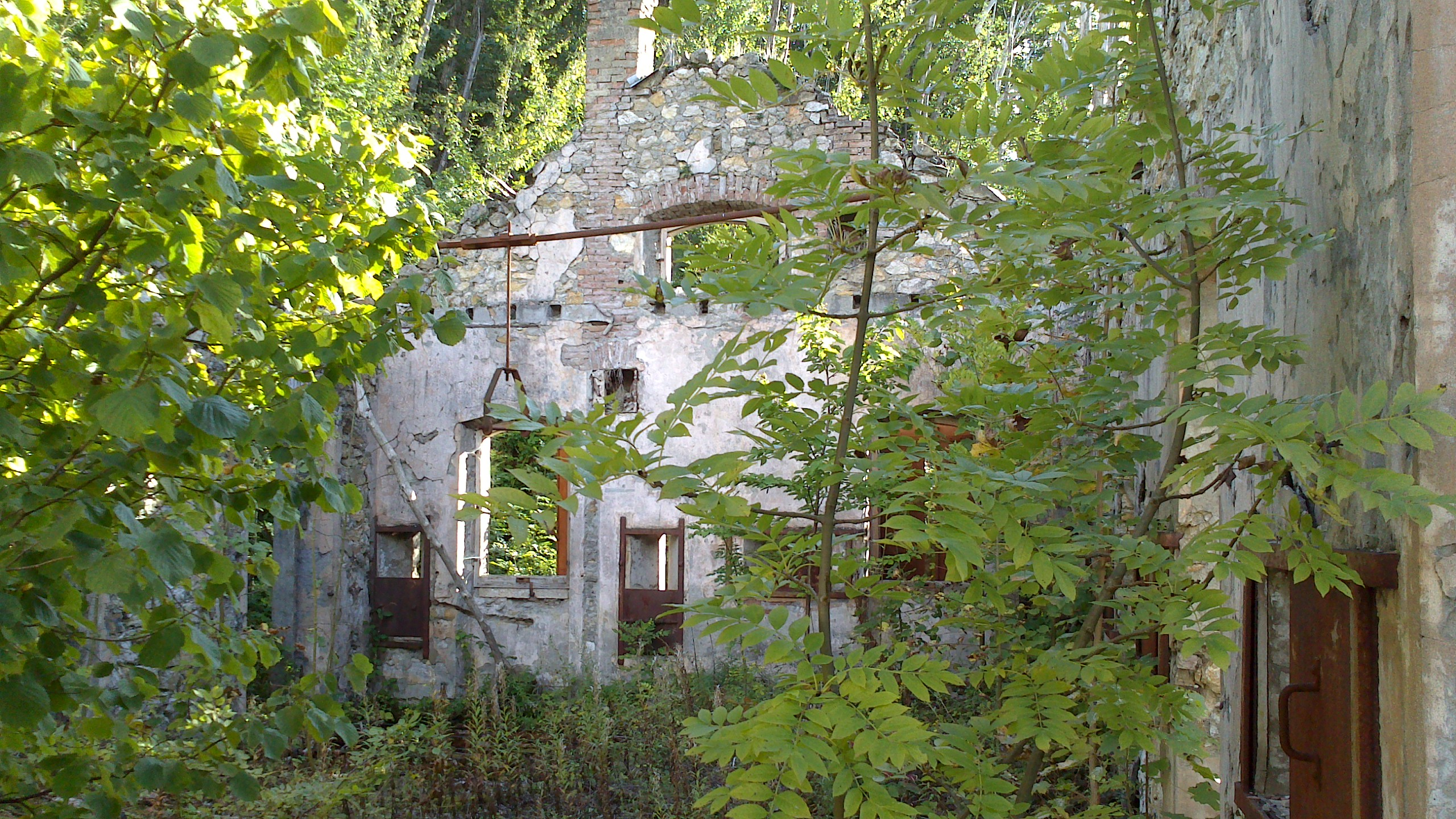
View of the first floor of the barracks building, overgrown with vegetation.

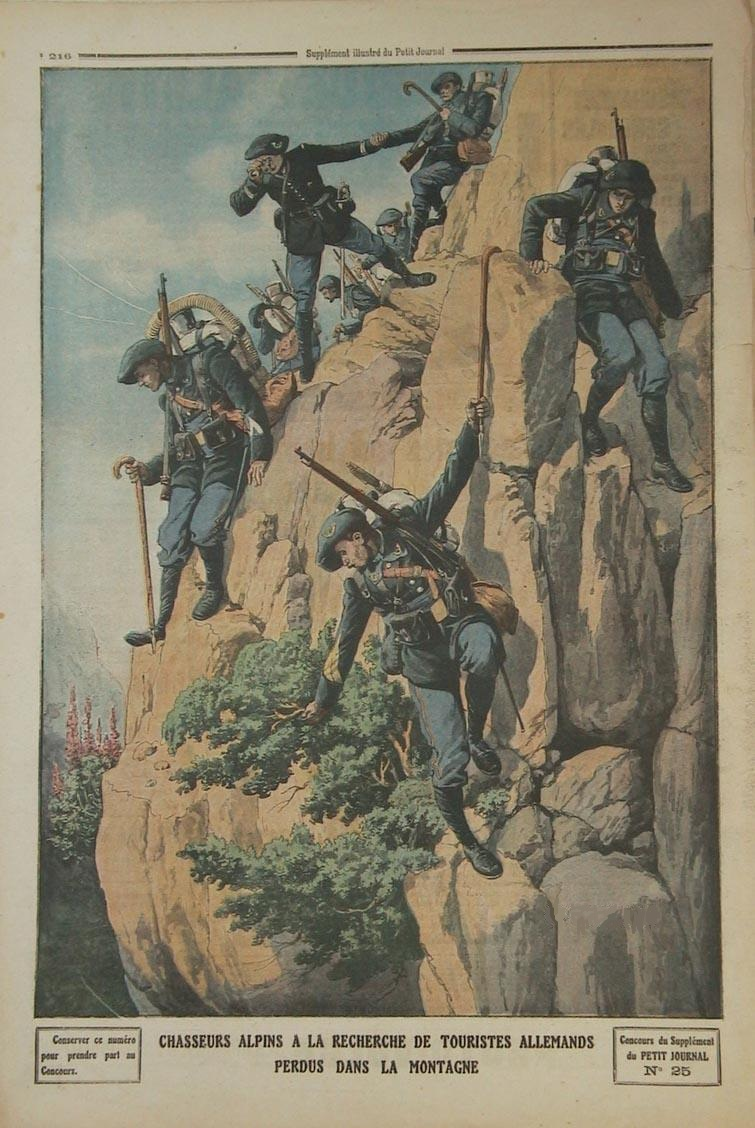
"Chasseurs alpins à la recherche de touristes allemands perdus dans la montagne' (Alpine hunters searching for German tourists lost in the mountains): supplement to the Petit Journal no. 25 of 7 July 1912.

At the turn of the 19th and 20th centuries, due to its proximity to the Grenoble agglomeration, the Néron became a favourite training ground for mountaineers and alpine hunters. However, the number of accidents increased. On April 28, 1901, Ferdinand Chabert and Georges Scholastique, aged twenty-two and twenty-one, disappeared in the fog and rain. Despite the presence of many rescuers and the proposal to use aerostats to find them, the search was unsuccessful. The first issue of Alpes Pittoresques was entitled: "L'alpe homicide". General Louis André, then Minister of War, forbade the military to climb the mountain. The Guides Joanne gave an increasingly negative image of the Néron: "A perilous mountain, which caused many victims. [...] uninteresting. [...] Mountain without interesting views". On July 31, 1906, Gunther Ullrich and Alfonso Stegemann, two German students, reached the summit of the Néron via the Godefroy corridor. They tried to descend by the Monta side, but got lost in the darkness and got separated. Ullrich, perhaps a victim of sunstroke, died while climbing the corridor that bore his name from the following year. It was only four days later, after an intense search that mobilised the 6th battalion of Alpine hunters, that his body was discovered, and with it the remains of Chabert and Scholastique. The latter was buried with the tributes of Paul Mistral. This was one of the reasons for the creation of the first mountain rescue committees: the Dauphin committee was founded in the early 1910s and Jules Charamathieu, a shoemaker in Rue Chenoise in Grenoble, was appointed president. The absence of a detailed guidebook and a safe route was highlighted as a possible cause of these accidents. Thus, in 1907, Émilie Morel-Couprie, president of the Club ascensionniste, with P. Glaizot, published a monograph on the Néron, accompanied by numerous sketches, and took advantage of the opportunity to give a definitive name to many sites on the mountain. This descriptive work was completed by Professor Samuel Chabert, father of the young deceased. He also campaigned, through several articles in Le Dauphiné, for the marking out of paths and the installation of handrails along them. Thus the Ullrich path was built and inaugurated on August 4; the Roman path was restored in 1908 between the Néron meadow and the post thanks to the patronage of Aiguebelle, vice-president of the Rocher Club; the French Alpine Club, thanks to money paid by the Germans Pfau and Mayer following their rescue, restored the path leading to the Muret, which was later named the path of the Virgin Fountain, and had a cable laid in the cornice of the Hermitage. Warning signs have been put up: under the Écureuil gap, "Very dangerous corridor, leads to a cliff. Do not go into it"; under the Godefroy couloir, "For experienced climbers". These maintenance efforts have led to a renewed interest and an update of the article on the Néron in the 1910 edition of the Guides Joanne.

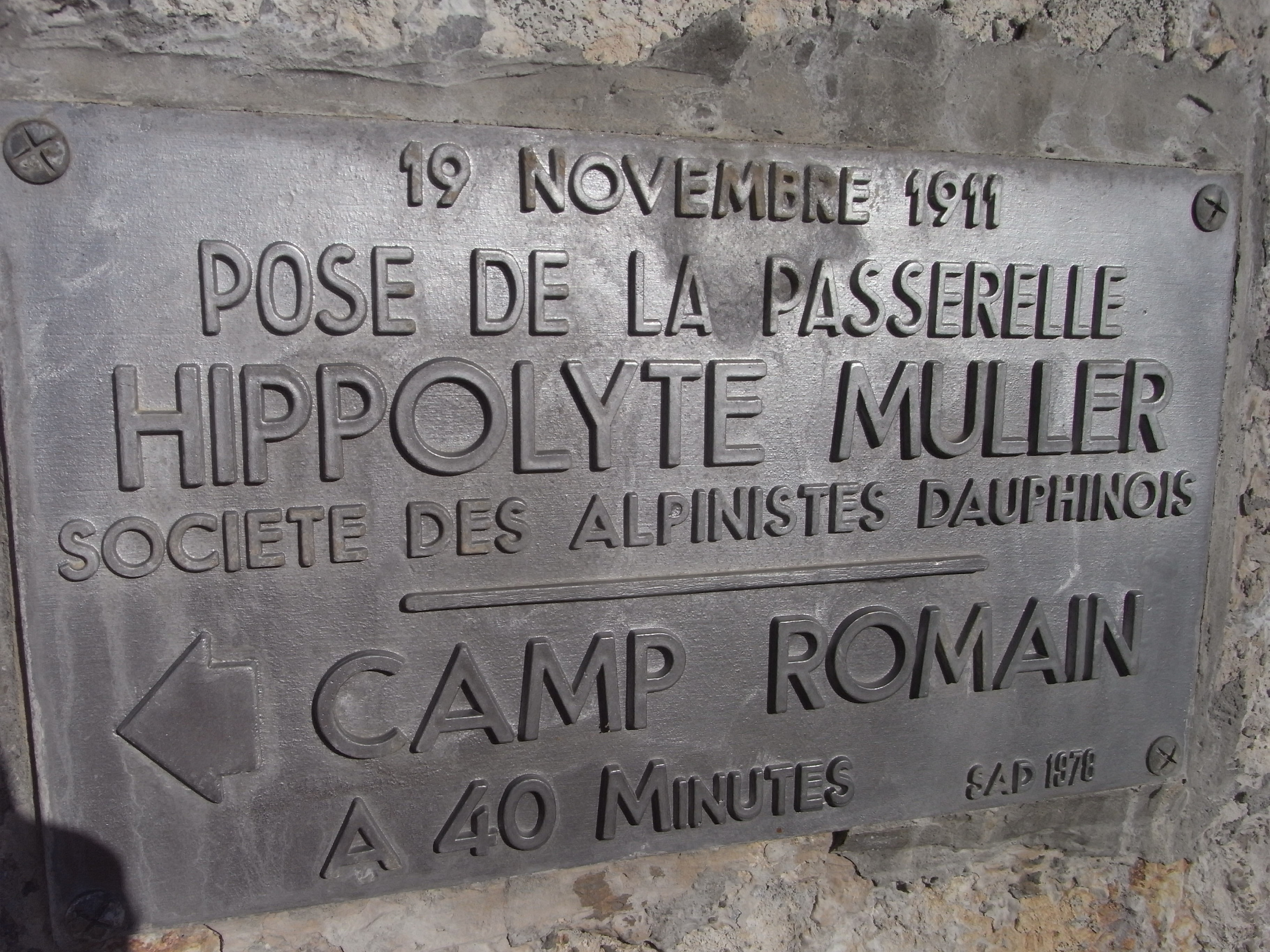
View of the plaque erected in 1978, in homage to Hippolyte Müller, at the footbridge installed on November 19, 1911.

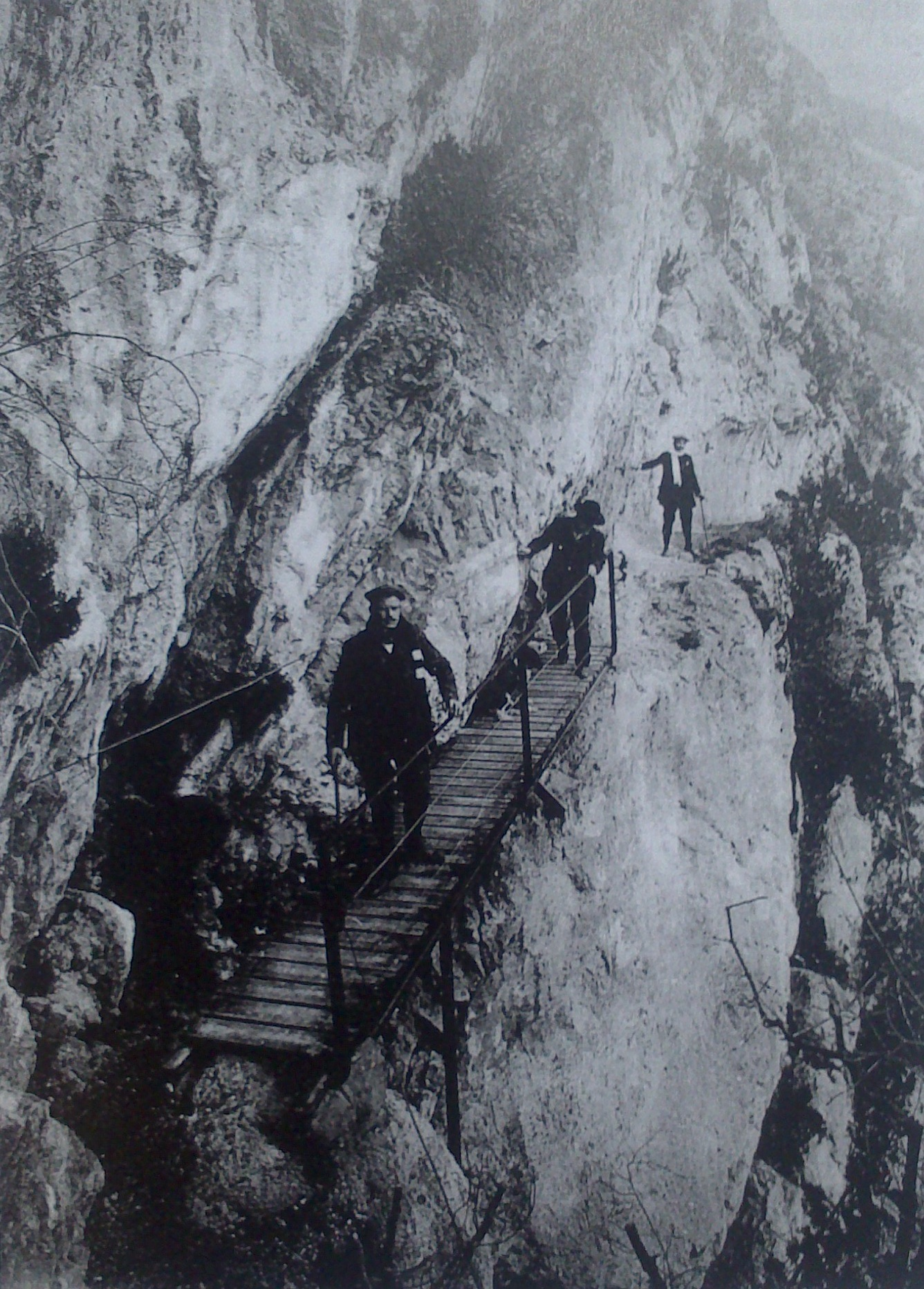
Old view of the Roman road footbridge.

The connection between the Roman post and the breach in the old bridge was made by J. Ginet in 1908, using signals to orientate it. In the spring of 1910, materials began to be transported to the gap and measurements were taken. On May 25, 1911, Chabert, Ginet and Müller took part in the laying of the first 26-metre-long cable. On November 19, the new 350-kilogram footbridge, built by the locksmith Guillot from plans by the architect Fonne, was installed. The following night, the French Alpine Club organised a caravan of fourteen people, including women. Forty-one oak crossbeams were fixed to form its floor. A barrier was added opposite the wall. The work was completed on November 21, after several weeks. The path was consolidated with cement and cables were added upstream of the footbridge, bringing the total length of the route to more than 100 metres. On December 10, the inauguration of the structure took place, attended by 46 people, most of them members of the Société des alpinistes dauphinois. In 1978, the latter placed a commemorative plaque in the wall at the level of the footbridge, named after Hippolyte Müller in his honour. Despite the guides and facilities, many more accidents continued to occur as new routes were opened. In June 1912, two more German students, Schell and Kern, disappeared. An airplane was used during the search and they were found two days later by Lieutenant Touchon's men at the top of the Godefroy corridor. In August 1913, Gunckel, Zorn and Makedousky, poorly equipped and having left late for the Roman post, got lost; they were found the next day by the Rescue Committee, which had been warned by Boujard after hearing their cries. In 1927, the Dauphiné mountain rescue committee, which had been damaged by the First World War, was revived by the mountaineer Pierre Dalloz, the future founder of the Vercors maquis, and by its president Albert Gonnet. In September 1928, he received a donation from two young German women, Hannah Appel and Erna Strauss, who had been rescued from the Néron meadow. In December of the same year, Berthe Renoux, aged about twenty, died of cold and snow after a winter ascent of the Godefroy corridor in the company of Jean Duboin, who was rescued the next day on the western slope and then hospitalised. In the twenty-five years of the Mountain Rescue Committee's existence, ten deaths have been recorded at Néron. In the meantime, from September to November 1926, the first speleological descriptions were made by Raoul Pinat, Samuel Chabert and then Claude Espinoux.

In the second half of the 19th century, the vines were affected by powdery mildew, then with the importation of American varieties, successively by phylloxera, mildew and black rot. Grafting replaced layering, making it possible to select the properties of the different plants and to make them more robust. In the 1910s and 1920s, Néron was intensively replanted; the vines rose to an altitude of over 600 metres. However, from the 1940s onwards, with the increase in imports, the scarcity of labour and urbanisation, the vineyards declined and almost disappeared.

The Boujard inn was opened at the beginning of the 20th century in the Hermitage. It welcomed hikers and sold them patched clothes to replace those they had inevitably torn in the boxwoods during the climb. The Hermitage estate, after having passed through the hands of various owners since the French Revolution, was bought in 1927 from F. Villenoisy by Fernand Berthe, a member of the Touring Club of France. Although Pierre Guttin, a previous owner, carried out major renovations in 1880 and built a ramp to the balme, the main building was badly damaged by the explosion of the ammunition depot at the artillery range on June 29, 1918, and then by vandalism due to its relative abandonment. Fernand Berthe in turn carried out repairs. However, a major fire, fanned by the south wind, broke out in the late evening of January 10, 1932. The fire brigade was unable to fight the flames, especially as the water tanks were rendered inaccessible and the pumps unusable; the castle was reduced to ashes. The criminal cause was considered due to the multiple outbreaks of fire, the presence of lights shortly before the fire broke out even though the electricity had been cut off, and the fact that the gate was open even though the owner had closed it when he left the premises. Suspicions were raised about the Boujard Inn, whose activity was being hampered by the rehabilitation of the Hermitage estate. However, the opening of new footpaths, the Second World War and the development of transport making other mountains more accessible sealed the future of the inn, which was sold in 1951. The Hermitage castle was never rebuilt.

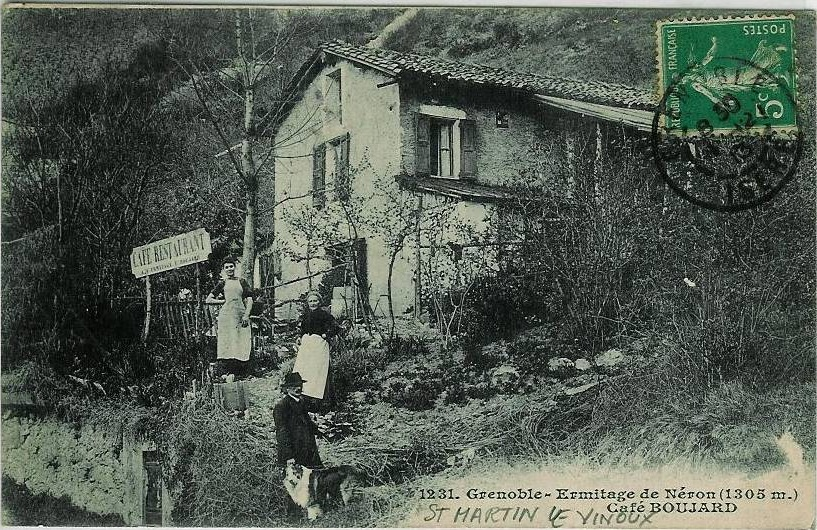
Postcard showing the Boujard Inn (pre-1913).

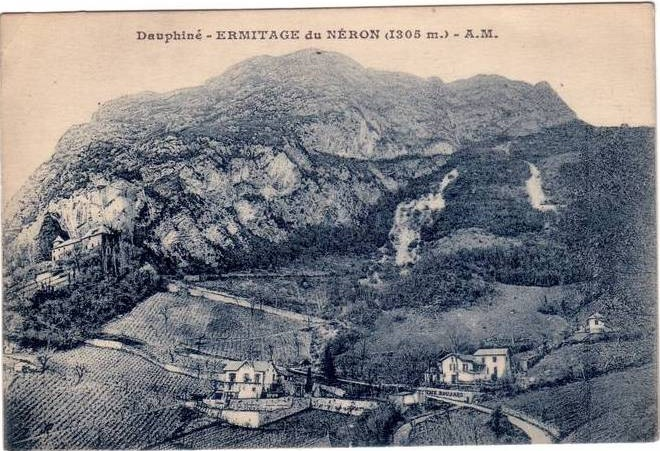
Postcard showing the Hermitage, with the castle on the left and the Boujard Inn on the bottom right.

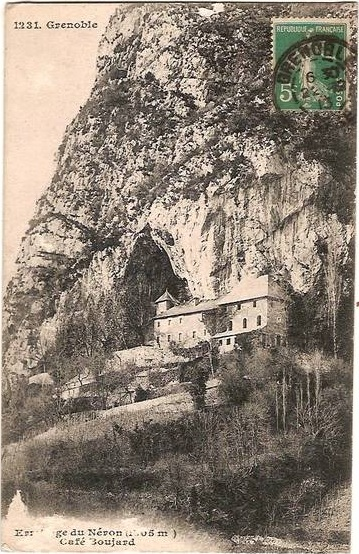
Postcard showing the Château de l'Hermitage (pre-1913).

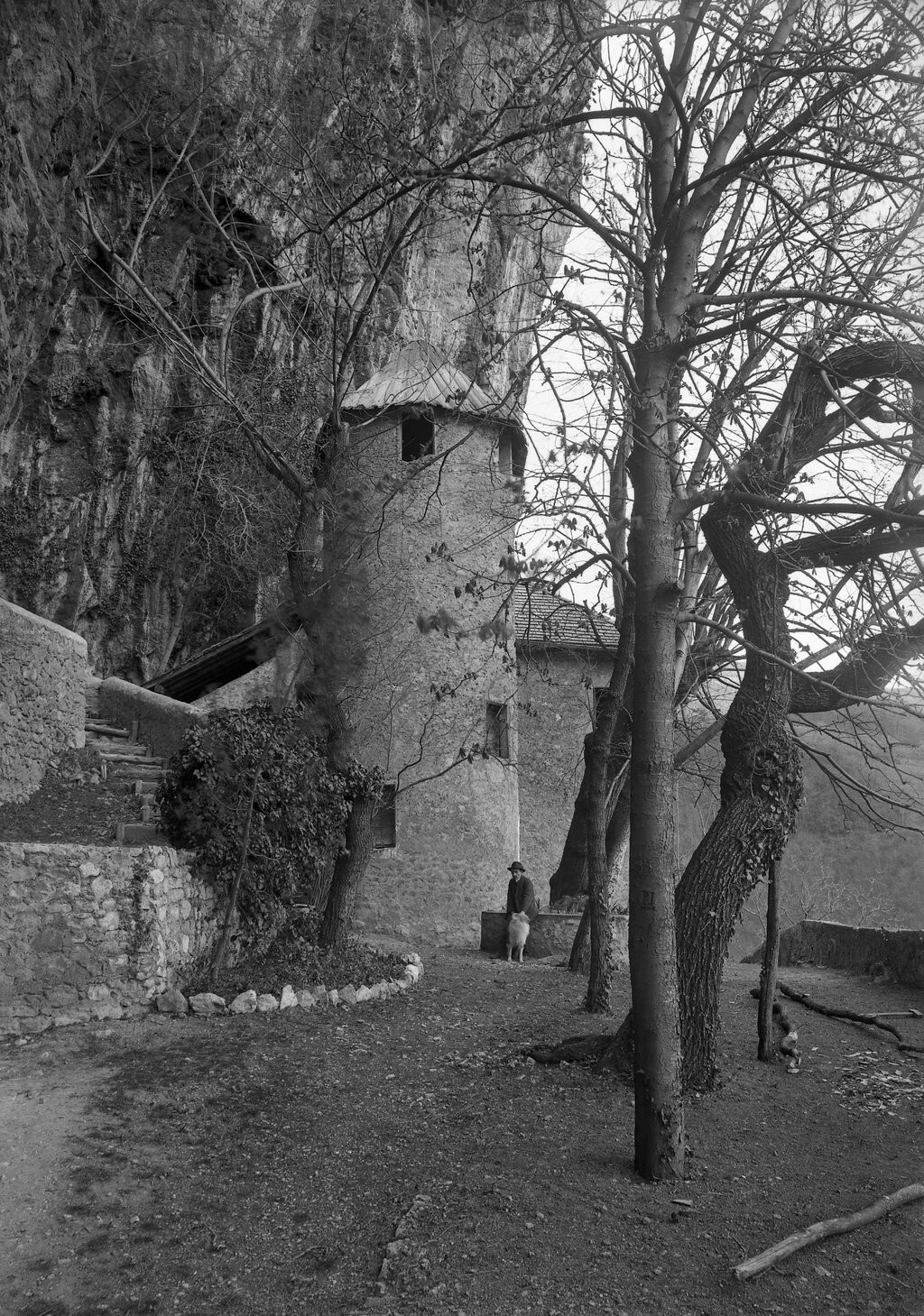
Old view of the outer courtyard of the Hermitage castle.

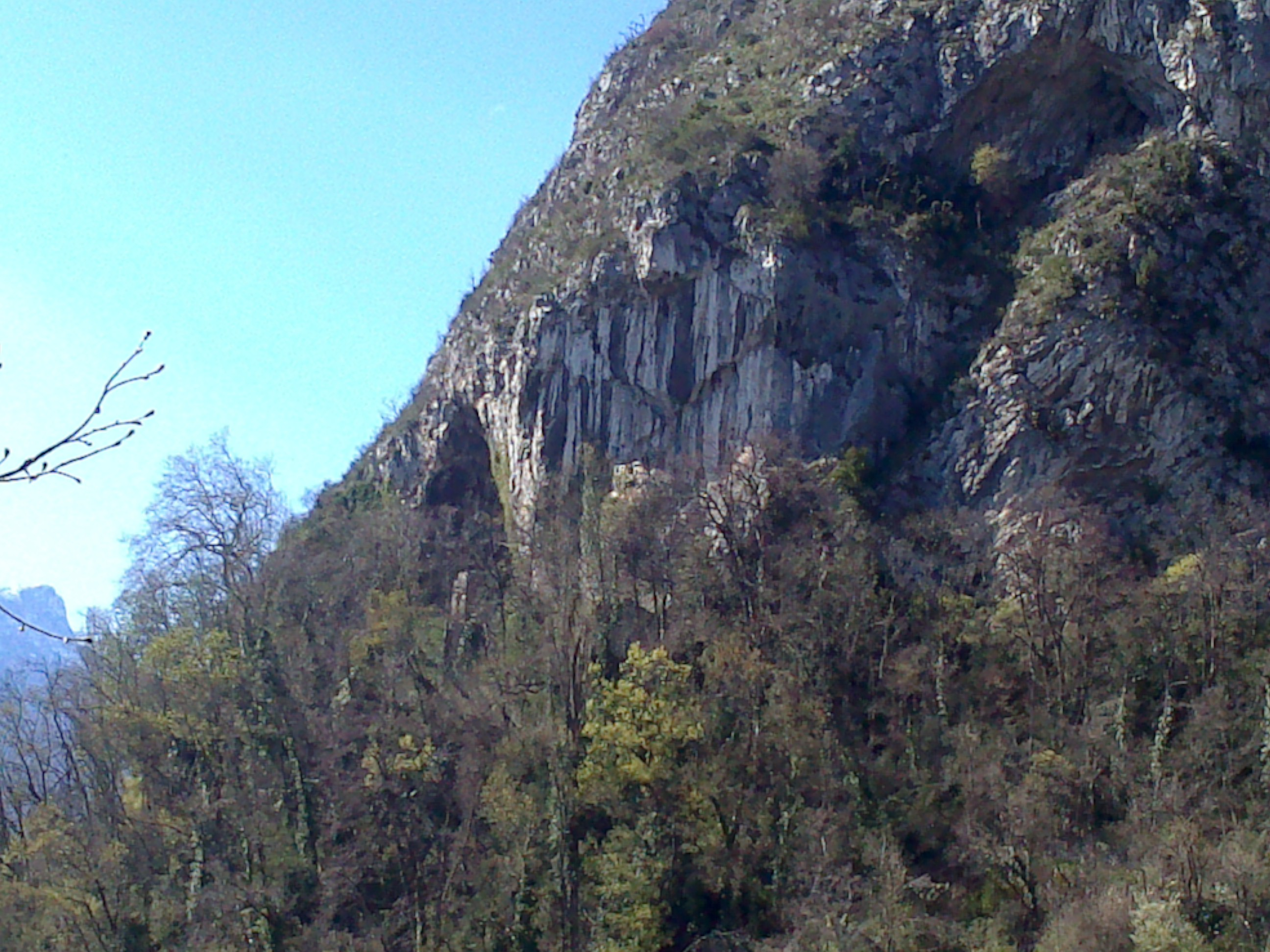
Contemporary view of the balme from the hamlet of Hermitage; the ruins of the castle can be seen at the foot of the rock face.

From March 8, 1943, André Jarrand and three companions, aged about twenty, took refuge for more than three months in the Néron river in order to escape the compulsory labour service. During the first days, because of the rain, they took refuge in caves but suffered from claustrophobia, then in the batteries, whose building was still in good condition but too accessible to the Italian military by the road. They spent the spring in the mountains and only went down to get water from the spring near the batteries, changing their route each time. They suffered from the lack of hygiene, were ill-equipped, especially as the snow was present until the end of May, and could not always cook their food because of the smoke visible when the sky was clear. They eat dandelion leaves, nettle soup and morel mushrooms, with a few eggs provided by the villagers along with bread. They spend much of the time playing cards. In June, they were surprised several times by ropes coming out of the corridors on the eastern slope. They then left the Néron for the farms and batteries of the Rachais. They found themselves a dozen Francs-tireurs et partisans, with a few weapons. Jarrand, under the pseudonym of Captain Dufour, took charge of the third battalion of Chartreuse, which set out to derail the trains between Grenoble and Lyon. However, due to the frequentation of the mountains, this small resistance movement was dissolved on July 14.

On September 8, 1956, a Bell 47-G2 helicopter crashed without causing any casualties at the Orphanage, in Saint-Égrève, after hitting the unmarked cable of a forestry operation on the mountain. Cable cars for transporting wood appeared in the 1880s and were used on a commercial scale from the inter-war period onwards. Cable cars for transporting timber are prohibited. The gazogene and gazobois were abandoned after the war, charcoal was no longer produced with the end of the iron bell industry in 1960 and firewood was largely replaced in the Grenoble area. Wood cutting was abandoned on the western slope and the loggers' tracks were overgrown.

From October 27, 1967, a thousand men were mobilized, in vain, to patrol the Rachais and the Néron, following the disappearance of a gendarme and his son. On April 28, 1980, the climber Guy Claret, author of several first ascents with his brother Georges at the end of the 1960s and in the 1970s on the southern face of the Néron, was winched out and rescued. Four years later, Daniel Érard, aged 54, died after a fall in the Clémencières corridor.

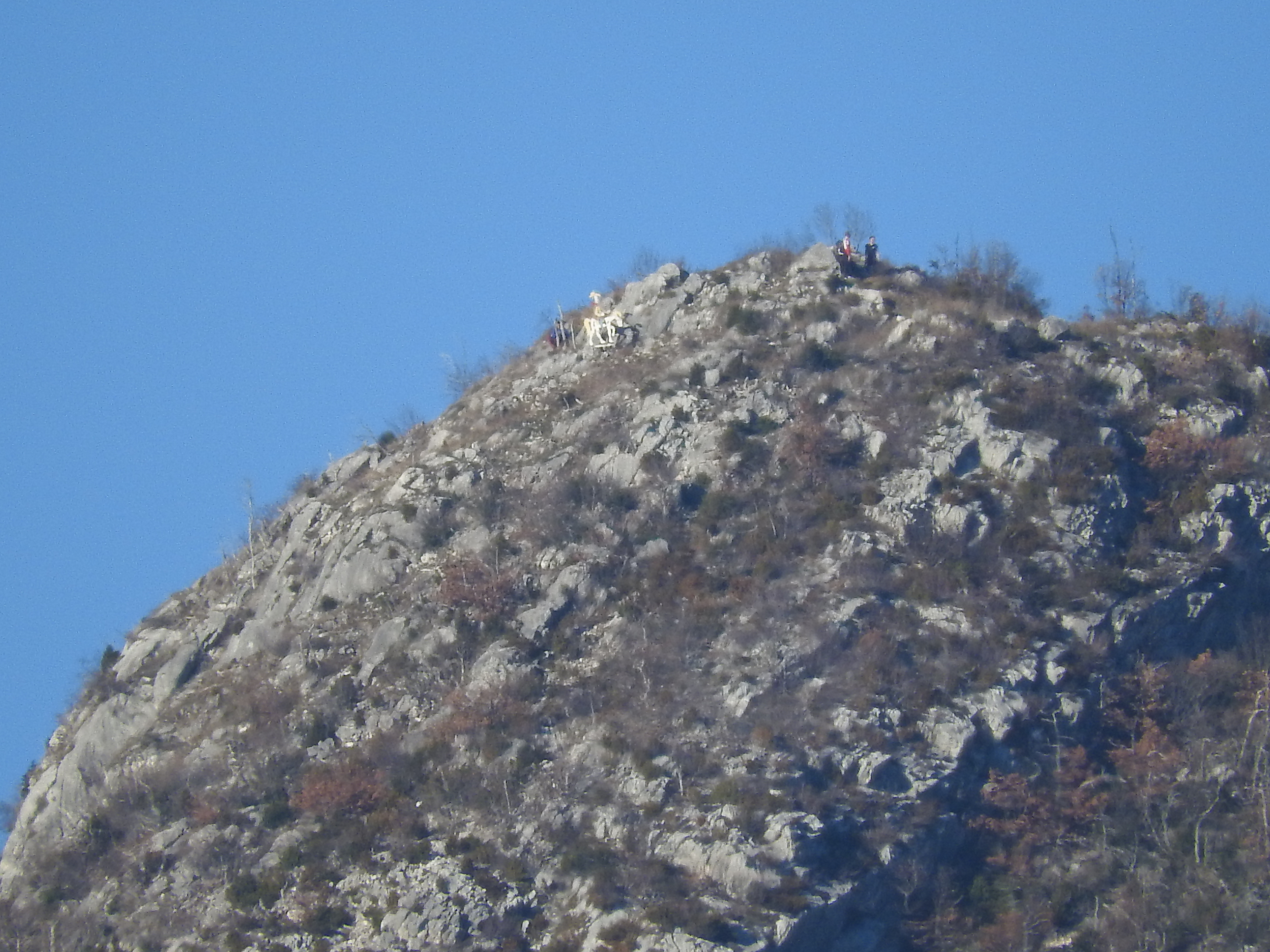
A distant view of the Lucky Luke work on the Nero ridge.

In the early 1980s, three hikers had the idea of setting up an innovative installation on a mountain. Their criteria were that it should be recognisable from afar and appreciated by the inhabitants of the valley. After having thought of the Grand Pic de Belledonne, their choice fell on the Trois Pucelles. After first thinking of Walt Disney characters, the figure of Lucky Luke riding Jolly Jumper was chosen. Rather than a fixed sign, the three friends chose to build a sheet metal weathervane over two metres high. The set is made up of three riveted panels for ease of transport: one representing the body of the horse and the legs of the cowboy on the pivot, the second the bust of Lucky Luke and the third the head of Jolly Jumper. The whole is installed, not without effort, on the highest of the limestone slabs. However, it was too far from the houses and was not identified by the population, which repeatedly alerted the mountain rescue service to supposed distress signals. After several useless interventions, the weather vane was dismantled in March 1982 by the high mountain gendarmerie squad and stored for three years at the Seyssinet brigade. Illegally retrieved, Lucky Luke was deprived of his weathervane but this time found refuge at Néron in November 1985 on the 1,007-metre shoulder of the mountain, which quickly became known as the "hump" or "Lucky Luke lookout". However, in April 1995, the work was vandalised by hikers. It was sawn off at the base, buried under rocks and quickly covered with vegetation. Claude Simon went in search of the "remains", encouraged by the publication of an article in Le Dauphiné Libéré, the daily newspaper that had been a regular columnist. He found and dug up the panels, before making his discovery known. The installation was retrieved and brought down by strangers to be restored. Finally, around the summer of 2013, Lucky Luke returned to its location, perhaps at the instigation of the children of the sign's creators. Jokes have it that Grenoble's air pollution is linked to his smoking.

The paths were marked out in blue in 1987 and were the subject of an article in the municipal bulletin of Saint-Égrève the following year. In 1992, a cable in bad condition in the Roman path was changed by private individuals. In June 1994, another cable downstream from the footbridge was torn off, probably by a rock fall. Because of the danger, the municipality of Saint-Martin-le-Vinoux decided to close the path to hikers in July 1996. Although an alternate route had been laid out, the decree was ignored. The following month, the cable was replaced by road workers. Finally, in September 1997, the authorities of the Chartreuse Regional Nature Park completely rehabilitated the cables on the Roman path, except for the one from 1992, which remained in good condition.

=== Natural hazards ===
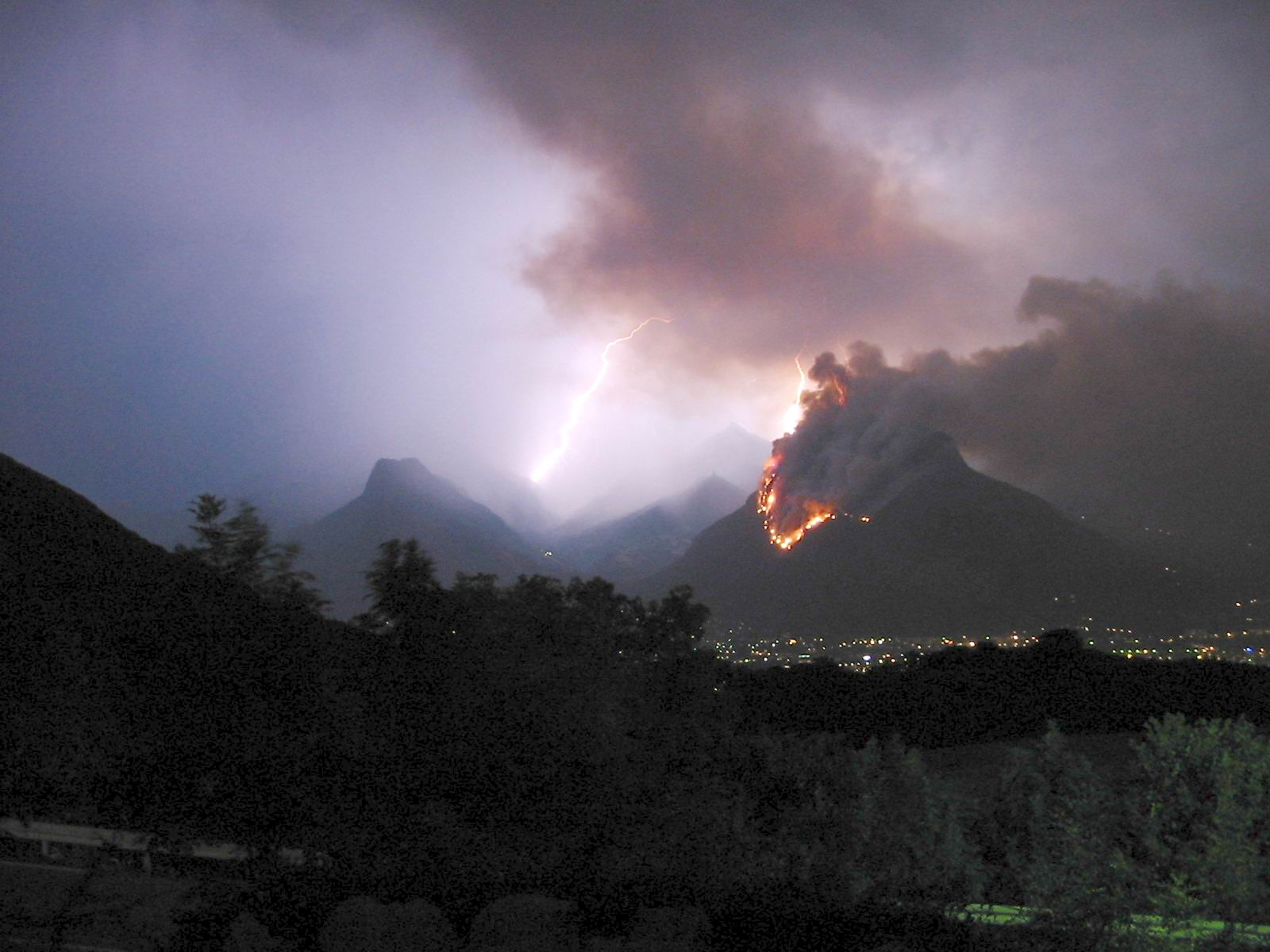
View of the burning Nero on August 5, 2003, the tenth day of the fire.

On July 27, 2003, in the late afternoon, in the middle of a heat wave, two lightning strikes hit the Néron. It seems that a fire immediately broke out above the Hermitage, in the Néron meadow. Firefighters from the Isère reconnaissance and intervention group in dangerous environments were airlifted in the evening and attacked the fire with a pump bucket. On the morning of the 28th, four firefighters were again deployed, along with water tanks. However, the southern wind has picked up and in the afternoon favours the burning of the vegetation in the slopes. Due to the smoke and the lack of water, the firefighters had to evacuate, as well as a first series of houses as they were threatened by the embers and falling rocks. The fire calmed down during the night but resumed on July 29 and water-bombing helicopters intervened, mainly to prevent it from spreading to the western slopes overlooking Saint-Égrève, while another fire was spotted below the summit. In the days that followed, rotations of Bell 214, Puma and Squirrel helicopters, which scooped up the artificial water of the Fiancey park, made it possible to control each new outbreak of fire. However, with the thick carpet of dead leaves, the shrubby vegetation, the very high temperature, the very low humidity, the gusty wind and the steep terrain, the fire smouldered. On August 4, shortly after sunrise, the wind changes direction and starts to blow from the south again, rekindling the fire from the summit. In the evening, it descended into the walls on the eastern slope and, above all, became widespread on the western slope. On the morning of the 5th, a crisis unit met in Saint-Égrève in the presence of the head of the departmental service for the restoration of mountainous terrain, in order to mobilise up to 200 firefighters to deal with the fire, as well as the gendarmerie and the municipal police to monitor the houses and to assess the risk of falling rocks. Four tankers are being provided by a local transport company. Shortly before midnight, a thunderstorm broke out and set the whole western slope ablaze, with lightning but no rain. On August 6, a press conference was held at the Grenoble prefecture. The fire went very low, just above Fiancey in Saint-Égrève. On August 7, the inhabitants of the hamlets of Muret and Champy were evacuated for the day, to allow the reinforcements of Canadairs to be dropped. They were rotated towards Lake Laffrey or Lake Paladru. However, most of the western slope had already been reduced to ashes and the fire was becoming less virulent; the forty airdrops that were carried out in total were mainly to protect the houses on the foothills. In the days that followed, the fire was essentially confined to the northern end of the mountain, with the exception of a few humus fires on the slopes and spontaneous starts in the forest on the eastern slope due to falling embers. The fires were generally controlled by the fire brigade on the ground and by occasional helicopter interventions, notably on August 11. Between 13 and 15 August, around thirty houses were evacuated in Saint-Égrève. Finally, during the night of 28 to 29 August, intense rain fell on the Néron; in the morning, the temperatures dropped and the humidity level rose sharply. The fire, a rare phenomenon for the region, finally lasted 33 days and burned 300 hectares. This situation led the neighbouring municipalities to temporarily ban hiking trails at the base of the Néron, due to the risks posed by the rocks destabilised by the fire. In 2009, some of these paths were reopened.

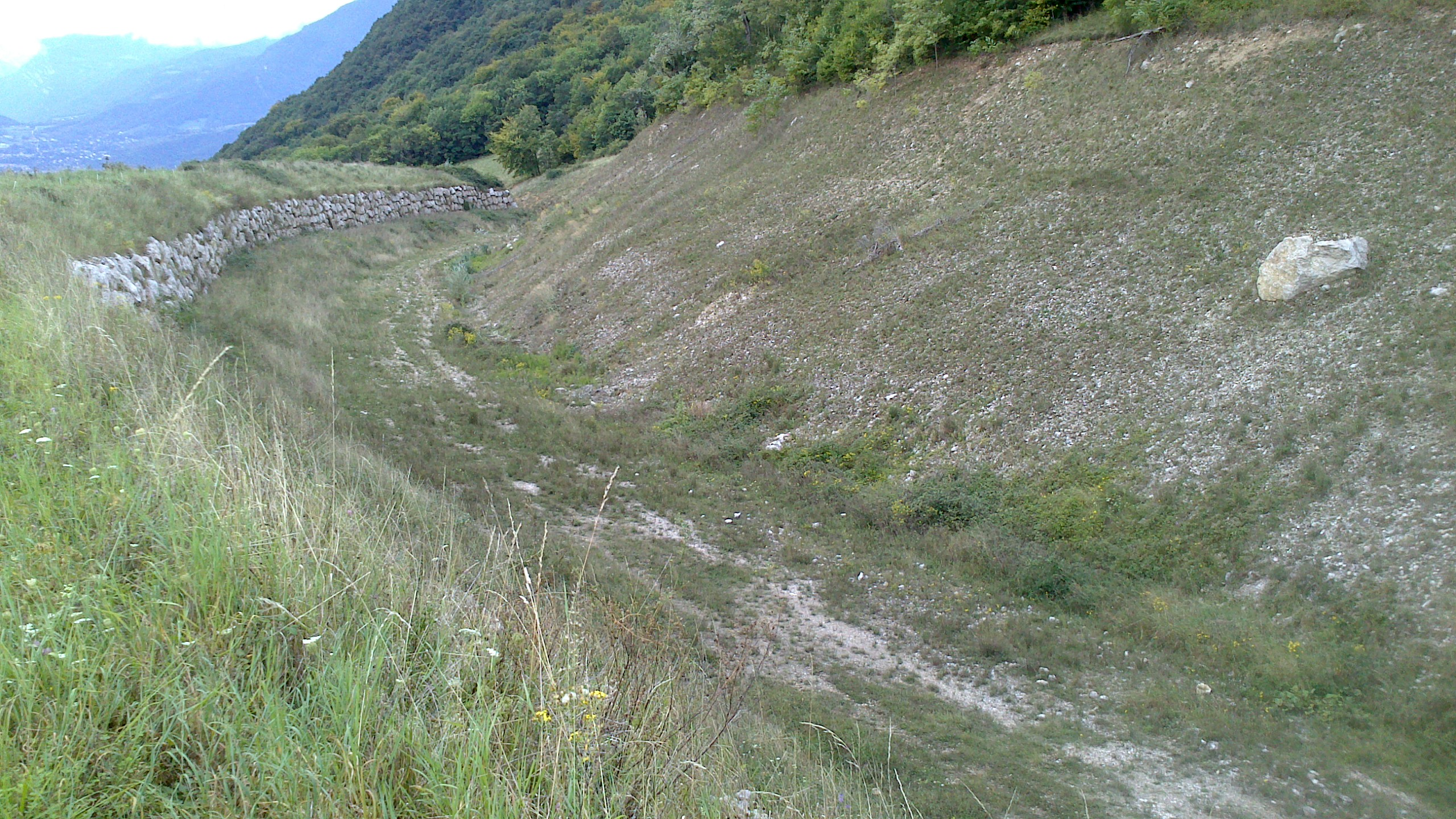
View of the merlon in the hamlet of Ripaillère in Saint-Martin-le-Vinoux, cleared of recent fallen blocks.

On August 14, 2011, a rockfall of 1,500 m³ (4,300 tons) occurred in the Godefroy corridor, on the eastern slope of the Néron. It came from a 5,000 m³ rock column that had been destabilised during the 2003 fire. The hamlet of Ripaillère, which had already been devastated in 1788 by a similar event, remained under threat, and a monitoring system including inclinometers was put in place in 2006; in addition, a 300-metre long, 25-metre wide and 9-metre high merlon was erected the following year. A few dozen hours before the landslide, the sensors detected unusual ground movements and the inhabitants were evacuated. Seventeen boulders were stopped by the merlon, the largest of which were around fifteen to twenty tonnes. As the threat had not been eliminated, a net was installed at the end of November and it was decided to proceed with blasting to purge the cliff on December 13. A nine-ton boulder was stopped by the net, the other boulders ending up in the merlon.

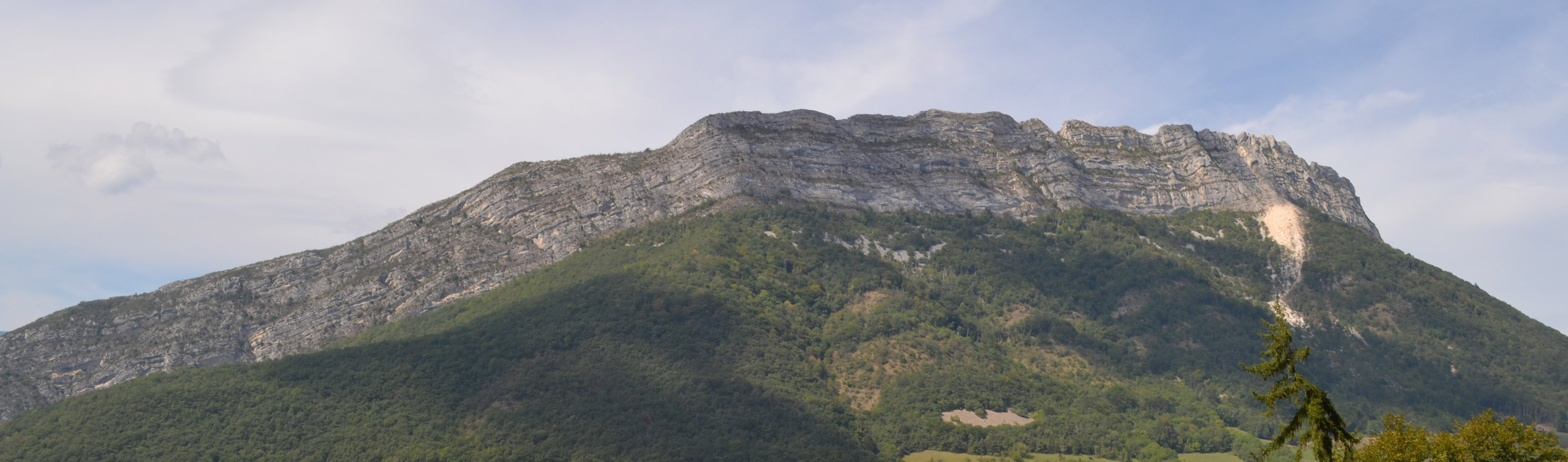
Panoramic view of the Nero ridges from the east; the 2011 landslide is visible on the right.

== Activities ==
=== Economy ===
A mini hydroelectric power station is located at the northern end of the Néron, at the level of the Oulle bridge, on the banks of the Vence. It is fully automated. The structures and outbuildings are located on the municipal territories of Quaix-en-Chartreuse and Proveysieux, in the immediate vicinity of Saint-Égrève. It was built in 1892 at the instigation of Félix Poulat, in order to supply the breweries he owned in Saint-Égrève, and was put into service two years later. In 1930, it was operated by the public limited company des Forces Motrices Vence-Isère. It was bought in 1975 by Roland Simon, who founded the LLC Noiselle. Still in operation, it produces 2.5 million kilowatt-hours each year, representing the consumption of 640 households over a year and equivalent to 550 tonnes of oil, which avoids the emission of 1,250 tonnes of carbon dioxide. Part of the water from the Vence is drawn from a reservoir of about 80 m³ formed by a 22-metre long and three-metre high gravity dam located at Inferent, in Quaix. Then, a canal of more than one kilometre, largely uncovered and parallel to the river on the left bank, on the side of the Néron, brings the water into a head chamber. The surplus is discharged directly into the Vence by an unloader, replacing the old "ski jump" weir-sandblaster. The effective volume then passes through a penstock 70 metres high, 200 metres long and 800 millimetres in diameter, which crosses the river and feeds the power station, located at Proveysieux. This has two Pelton hydraulic turbines and a Francis turbine with a capacity of 50 to 1,650 litres per second and driving an electric generator of 130, 250 and 450 kilowatts. Two transformers of 400 and 1,000 kilovoltamperes, outside the building, supply electricity to a delivery station via a buried power line to the EDF network at a voltage of 20 kilovolts. In 2014, an application for renewal of operation led to measures to strengthen biological preservation, particularly for fish.

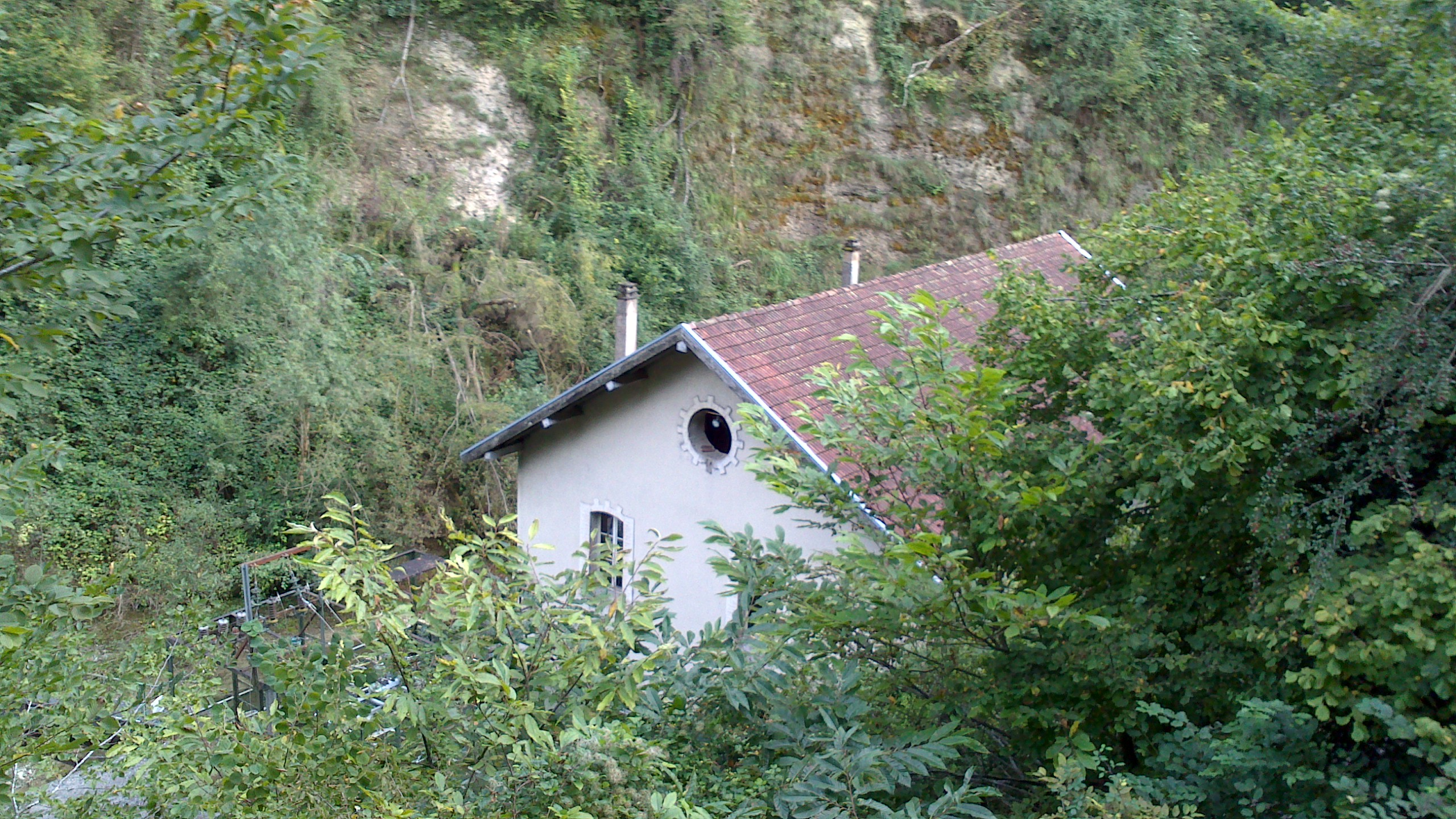
View of the main building and part of a transformer of the micro-hydro power plant of the Oulle bridge in Proveysieux.

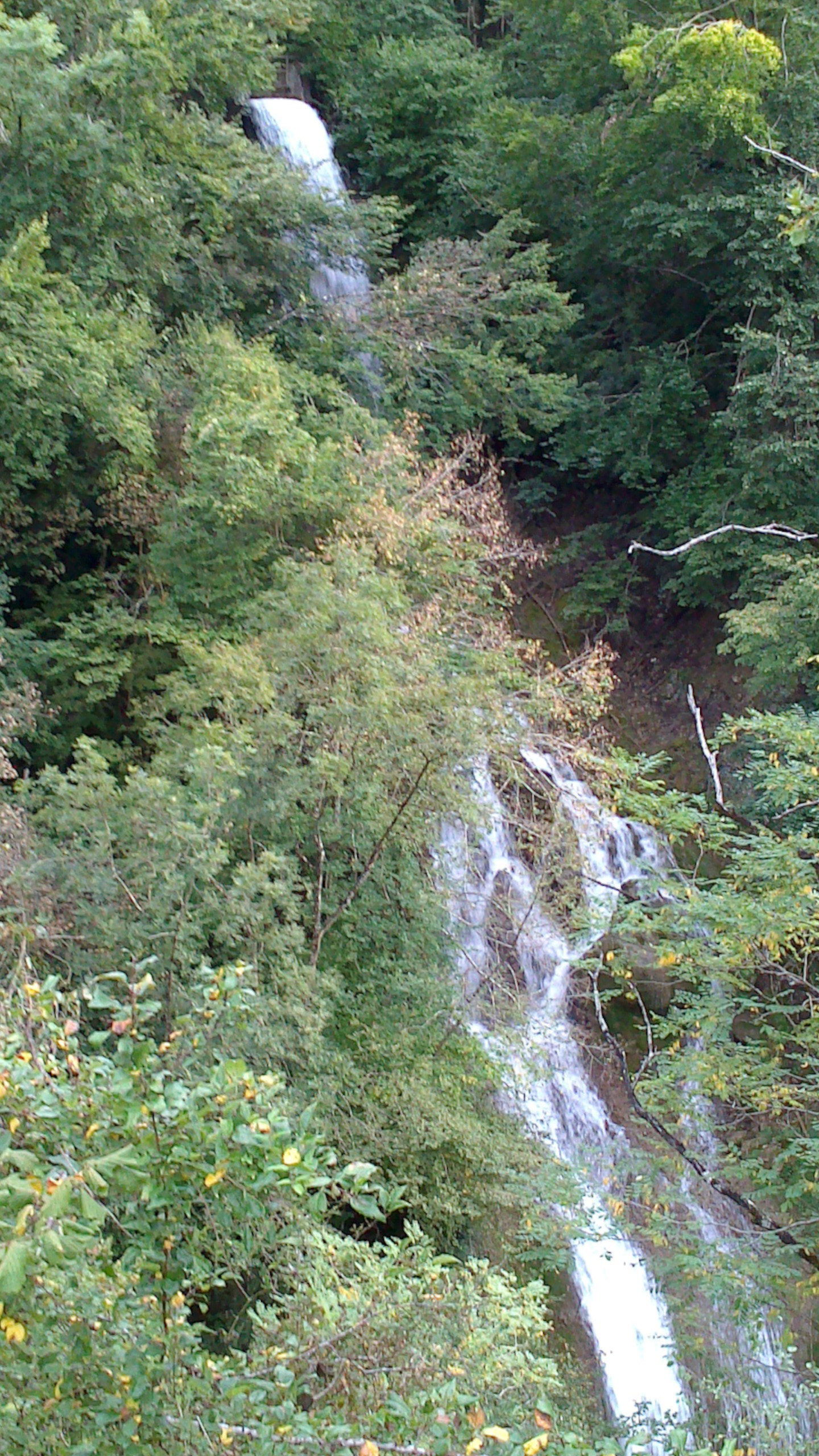
View of the weir upstream of the power plant, on the north side of the Néron.

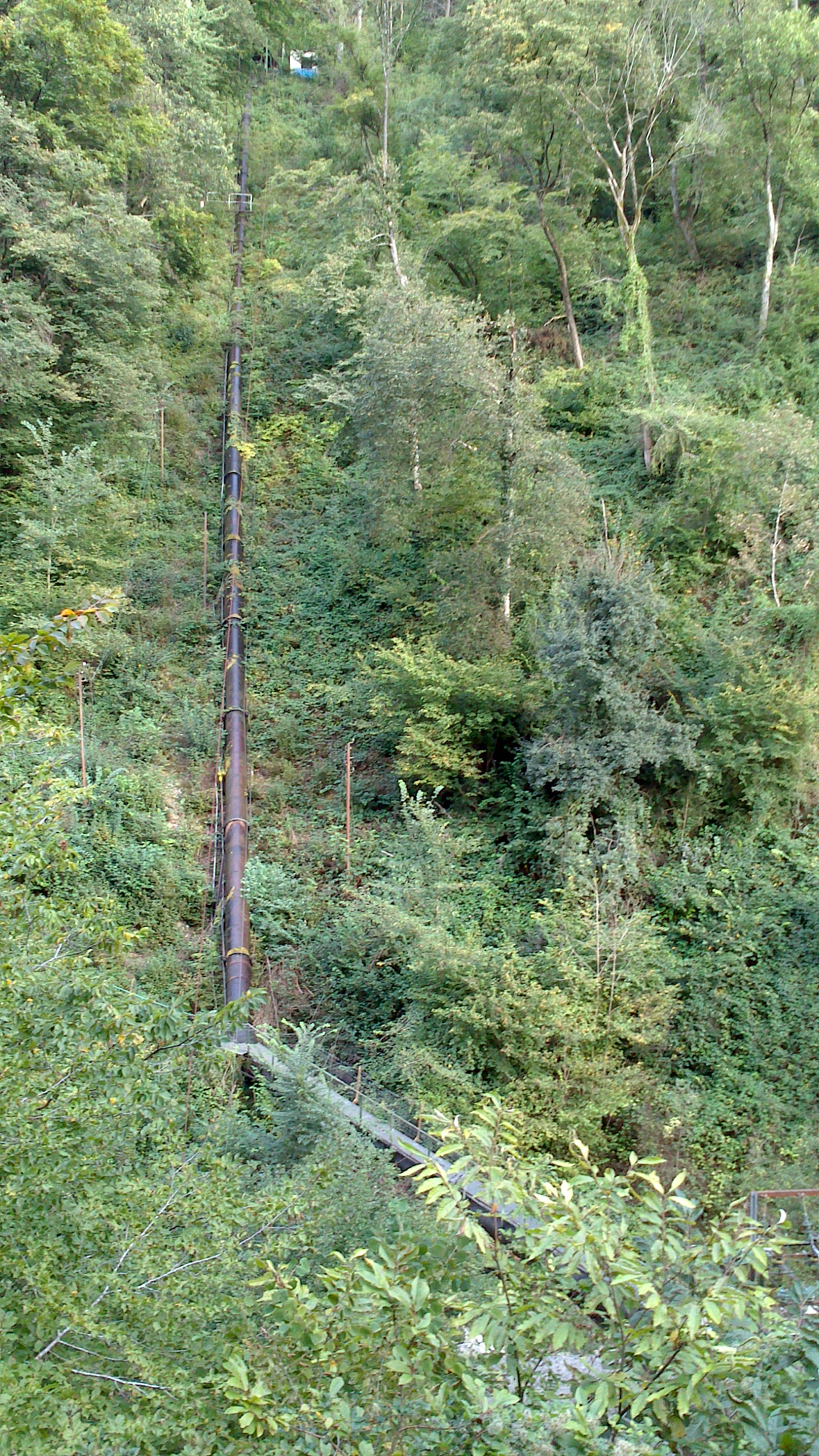
View of the penstock upstream of the power station, on the northern slope of the Néron.

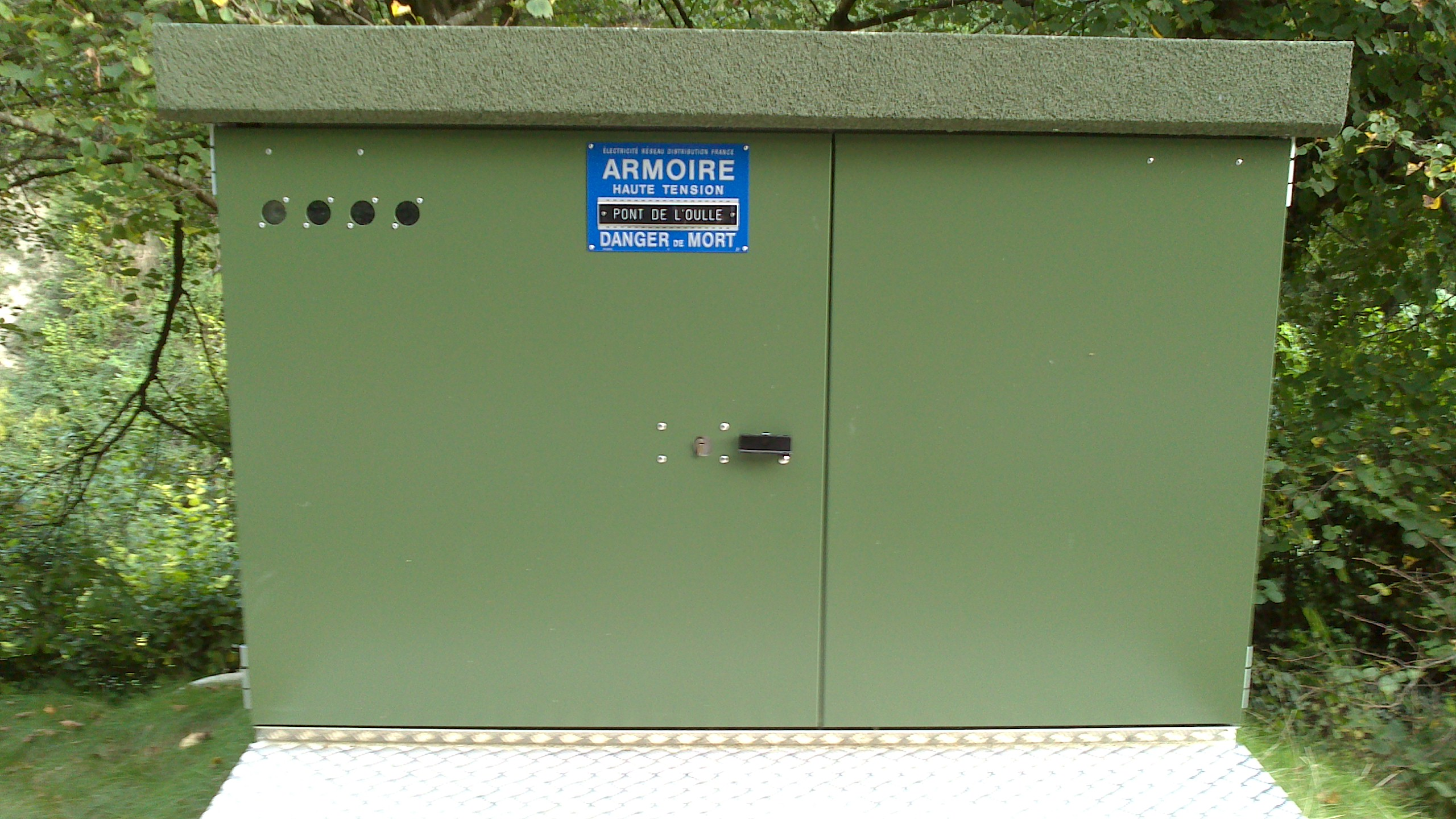
View of the delivery station at the plant's exit.

=== Hiking ===
Access to the Néron remained forbidden for several years after the 2003 fire due to falling rocks. The classic route to reach its summit consists of crossing the ridges from south to north, starting from the hamlet of Narbonne in Saint-Martin-le-Vinoux. It has a positive difference in altitude of 860 meters, but the route is rough and requires a half-day walk. It is marked in blue all along its route, although the markers are sometimes difficult to discern amidst the vegetation and rocks. The path is also accessible from the hamlet of La Rivoire. At the junction of the two paths, head west through the woods and then cross a rocky outcrop to the south-east wall of the mountain. This is equipped with cables that allow you to cross the cantilevered rock face and then the Hippolyte Müller footbridge, to end up after a few hairpin bends at the Roman camp. From here, head north and climb the 1,007 m humps - the "Lucky Luke lookout" - and 1,100 m without difficulty. From the latter, the ridge becomes a sharp ridge. Difficult weather conditions can make the rest of the climb very dangerous due to the risk of losing grip and getting lost. You have to cross several ledges and use your hands to reach the gap in the Z-shaped corridor. This can be an escape route to the hamlet of Ripaillère. Afterwards, new gaps, sometimes forcing you to tip over onto the eastern side exposed to the void, and a remarkable rocky ramp, though not very difficult, lead to a headland where a rough metal cross dated 1977 stands, with the words: "To the Neron, gentle, but fearsome". Then comes the Avalanche corridor, which is the most delicate part of the ridge and requires a strong sense of balance. After a short section along the ridge, the Godefroy corridor's fault forces a flank bypass on the west side, before gradually climbing up to a ledge that allows you to return to the ridge. The main summit (1,299 m) is marked by a cairn. The path continues on one side and then on the other of the ridge until it reaches a ramp above the Ullrich Ravine. It is recommended to be sure to unclimb it. Despite the temptation to descend it, a sign warns: "Do not go into it, danger of death". The opposite side of the rift is bypassed from the east. The northern summit (1,294 m) is marked with a red cross. A few dozen metres further on is the entrance to the Clémencières corridor. It is possible to push immediately to the north to the cave of Colonel Brun, overhung by the Couvercle rock. The descent is made quickly on the east side by the corridor of Clémencières to the base of the rocky walls. The return by the Quatre Couloirs path, along the cliffs, has been subject to successive restrictions since the 2011 landslide; it is advisable, at the foot of the corridor, to continue the descent through the woods until you meet the Batteries path and then, from Ripaillère, follow the road. Otherwise, there are also paths leading back down to Ripaillère and Gatinet from the Quatre Couloirs path. From the breach in the Clémencières corridor and the Colonel Brun cave, it is possible to continue north at the end of the ridges and take a variant via the Quaix corridor. It allows, in a succession of terraces, either to go down to the Batteries to the north and eventually towards the Monta, or to join the Quatre Couloirs path. However, this corridor is notoriously hazardous.

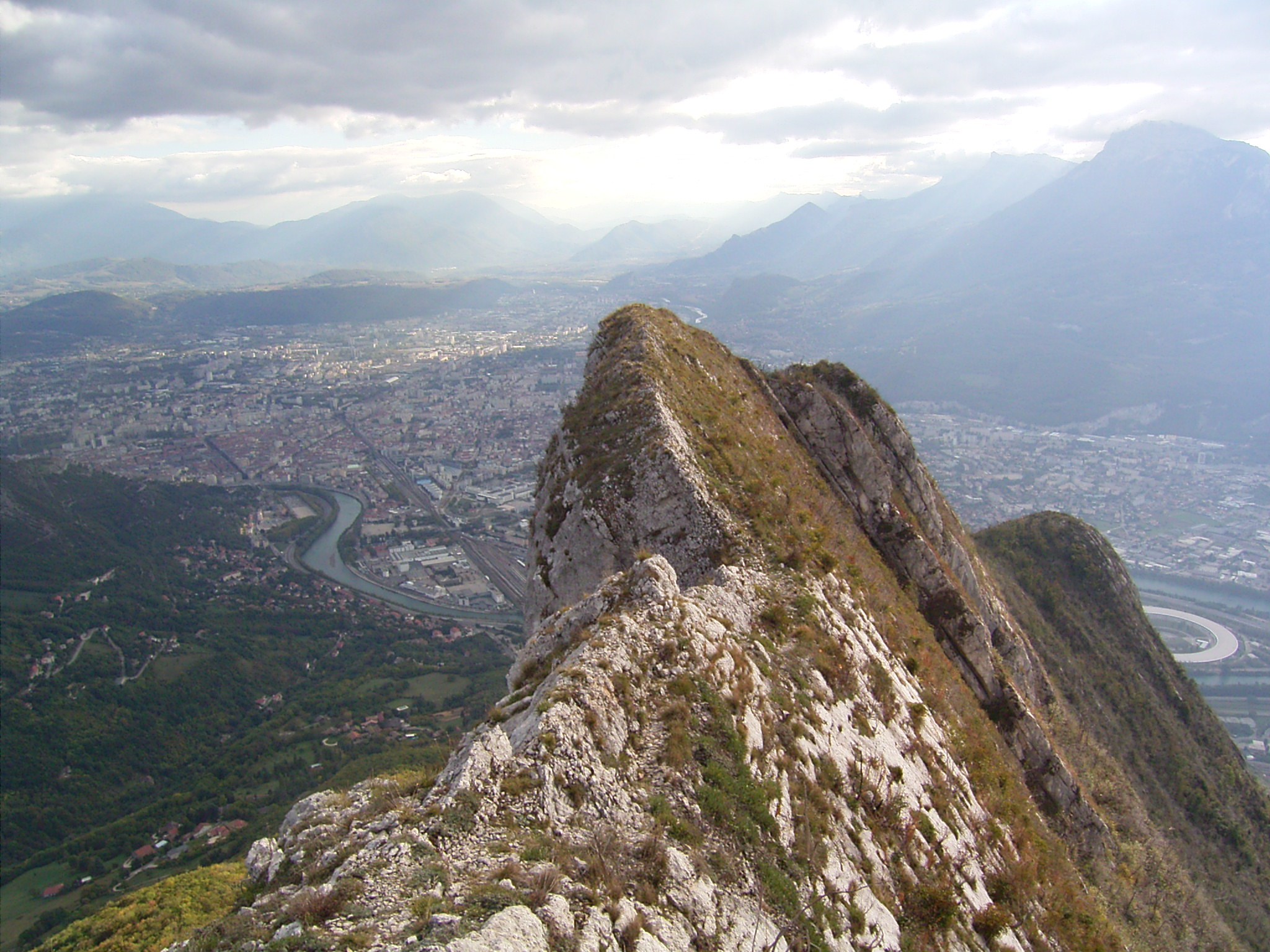
View of the first aerial passages along the Néron ridge, with the Grenoble area in the background to the south.

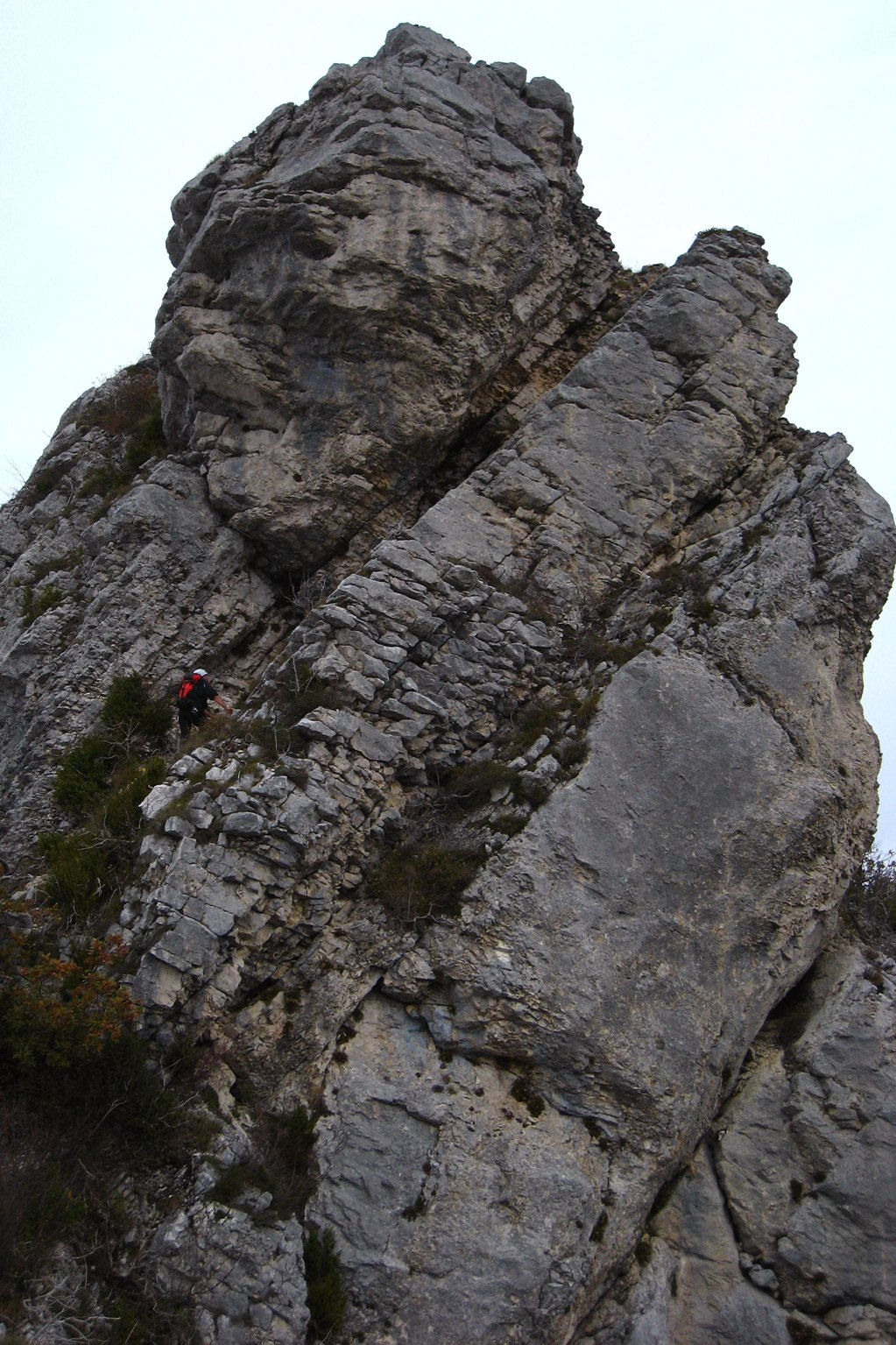
View of the dihedral ramp from the south.

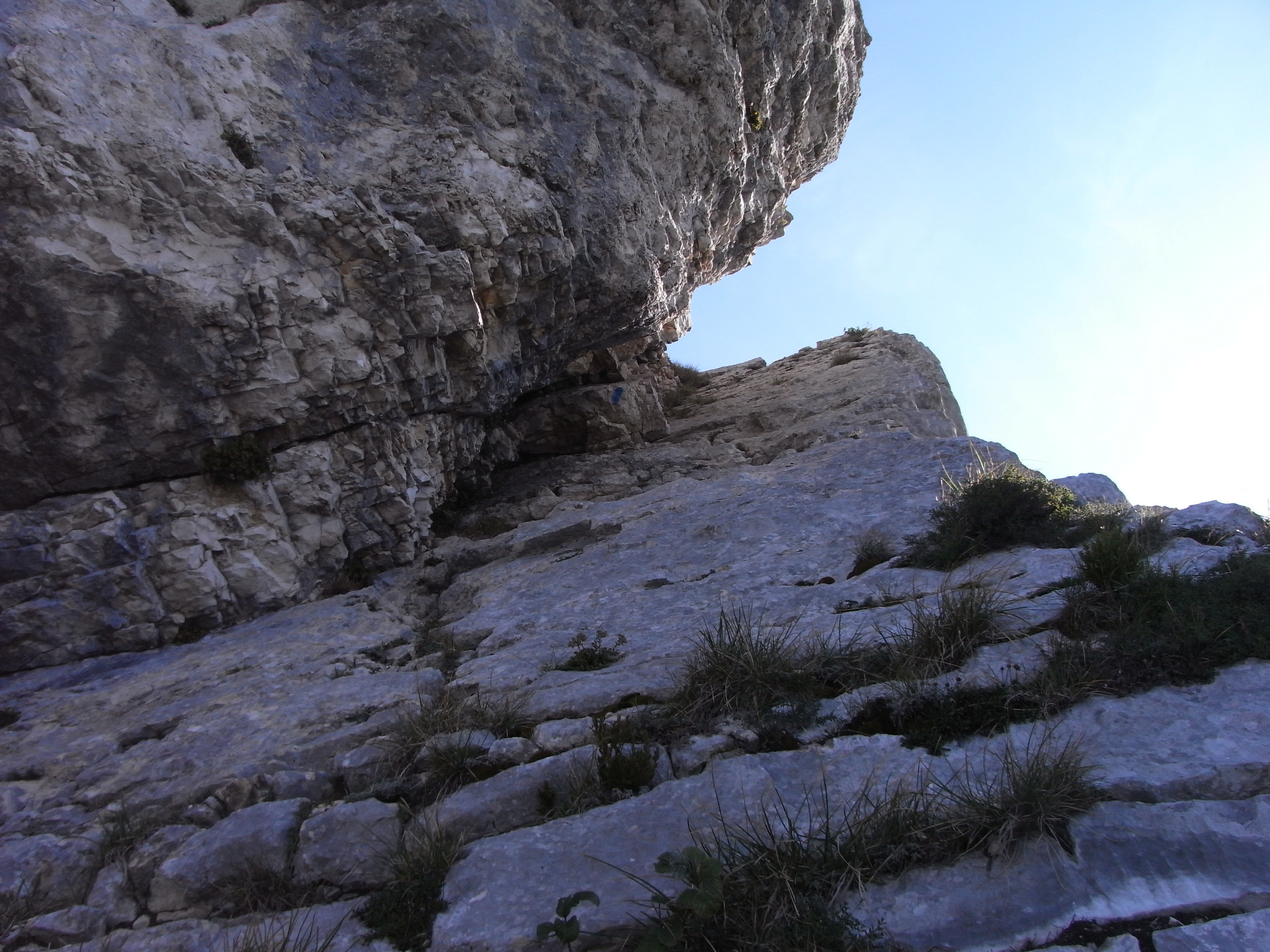
Low-angle view of the ramp.

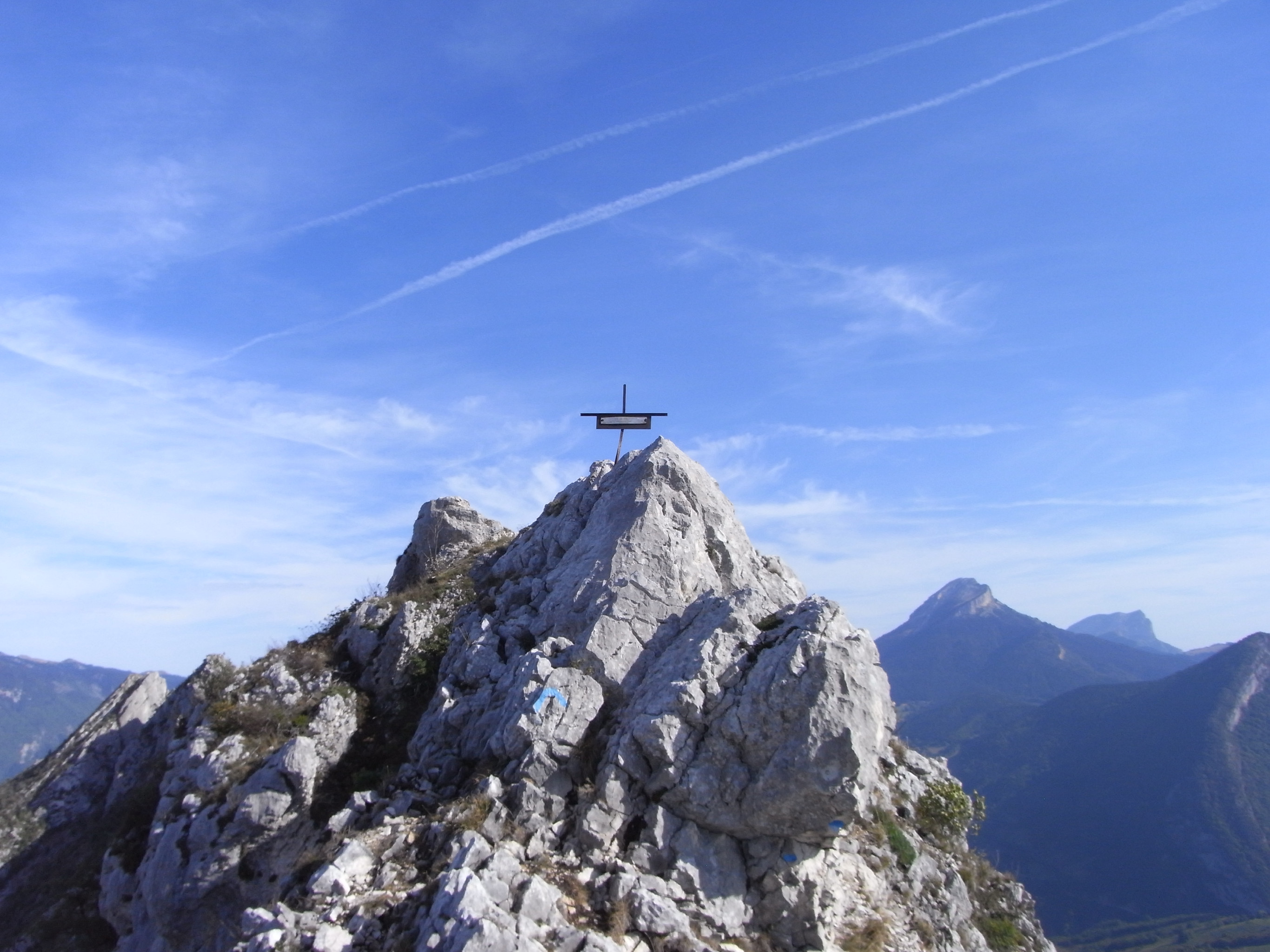
View from the south as you approach the summit bearing the metal cross with the blue marker clearly visible on the rock.

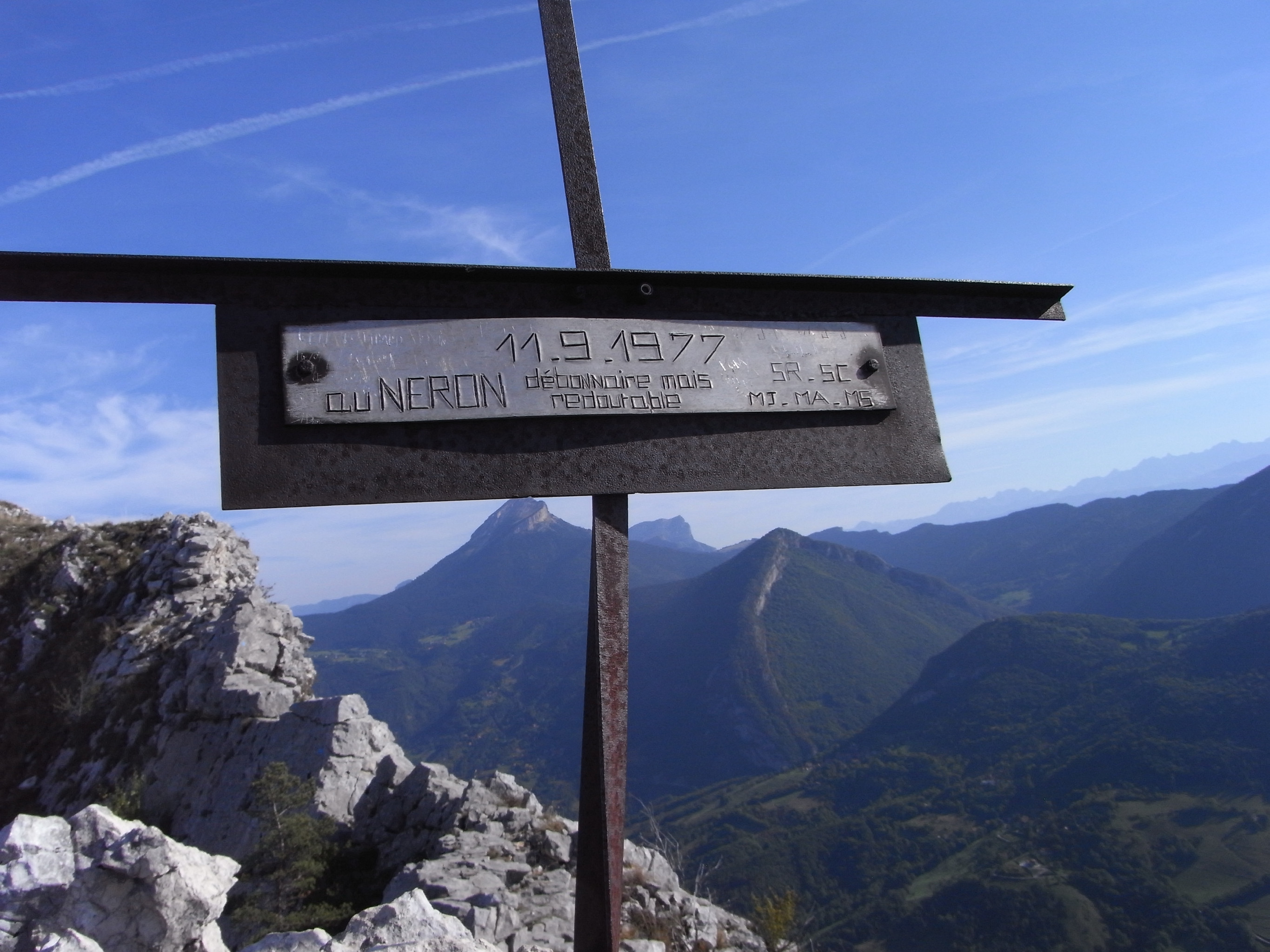
Close-up view of the cross with the inscription dated September 11, 1977.

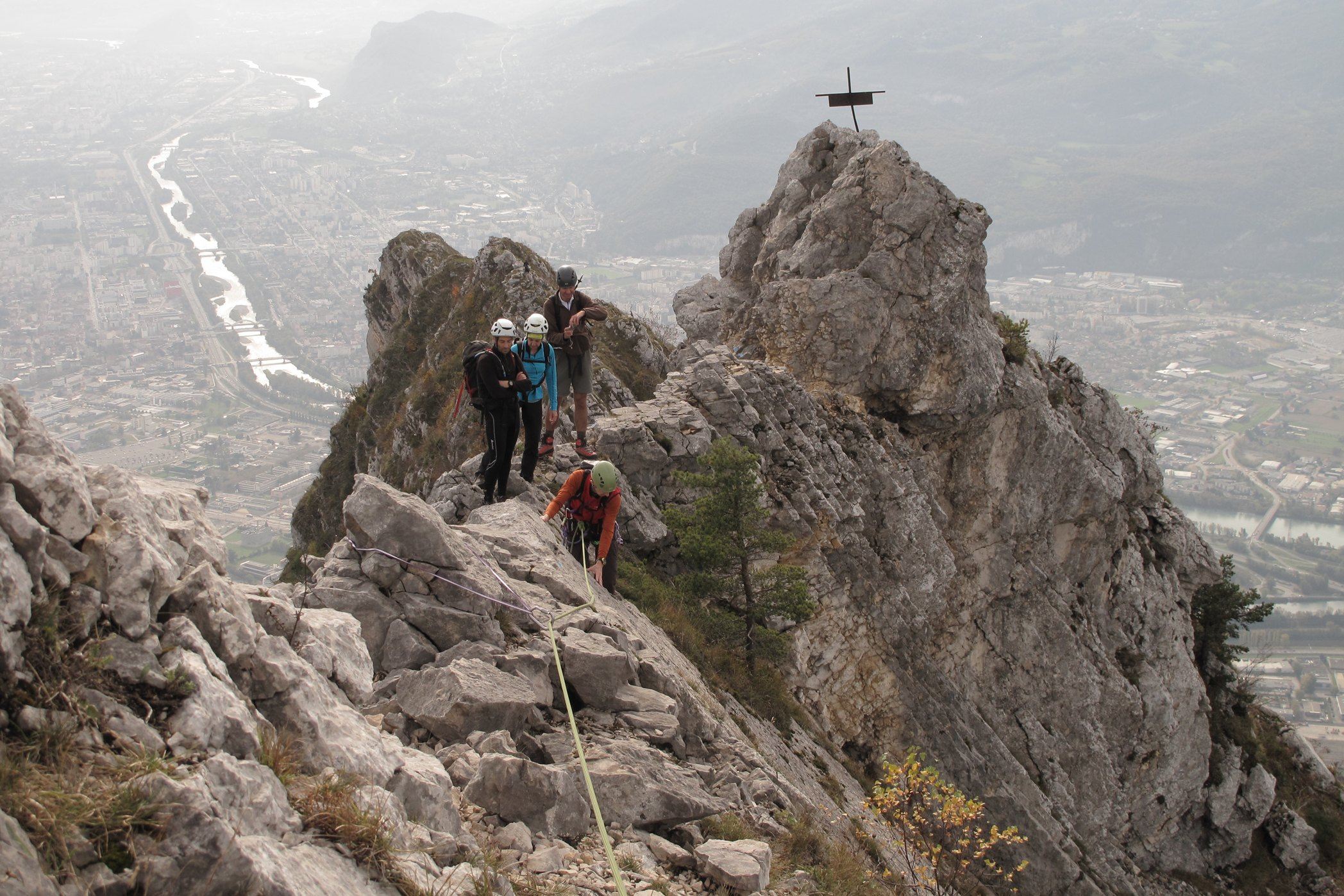
View of a difficult passage up the Avalanche corridor requiring roping up; the river in the background on the left is the Drac.

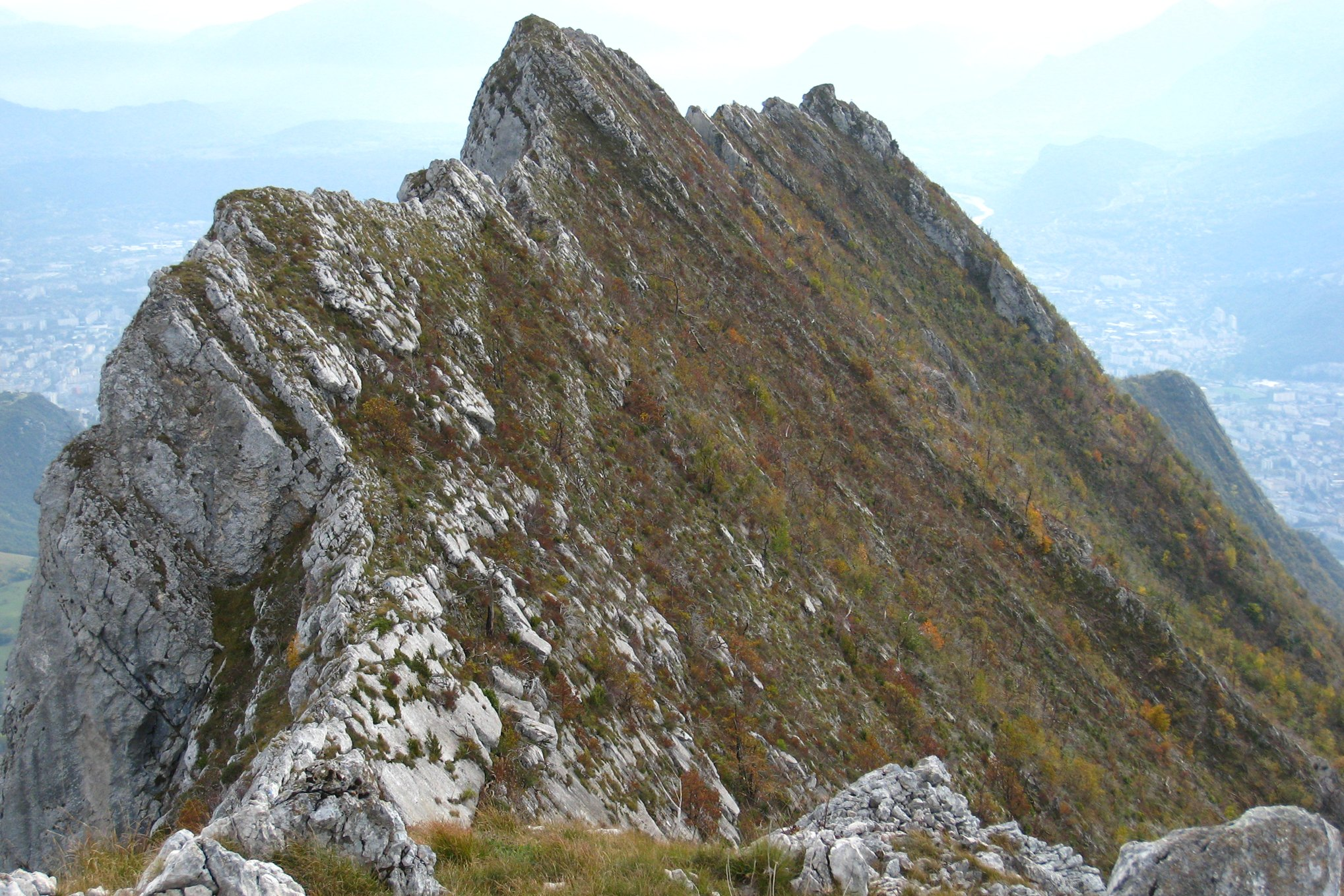
View of the ridges from the main summit towards the south.

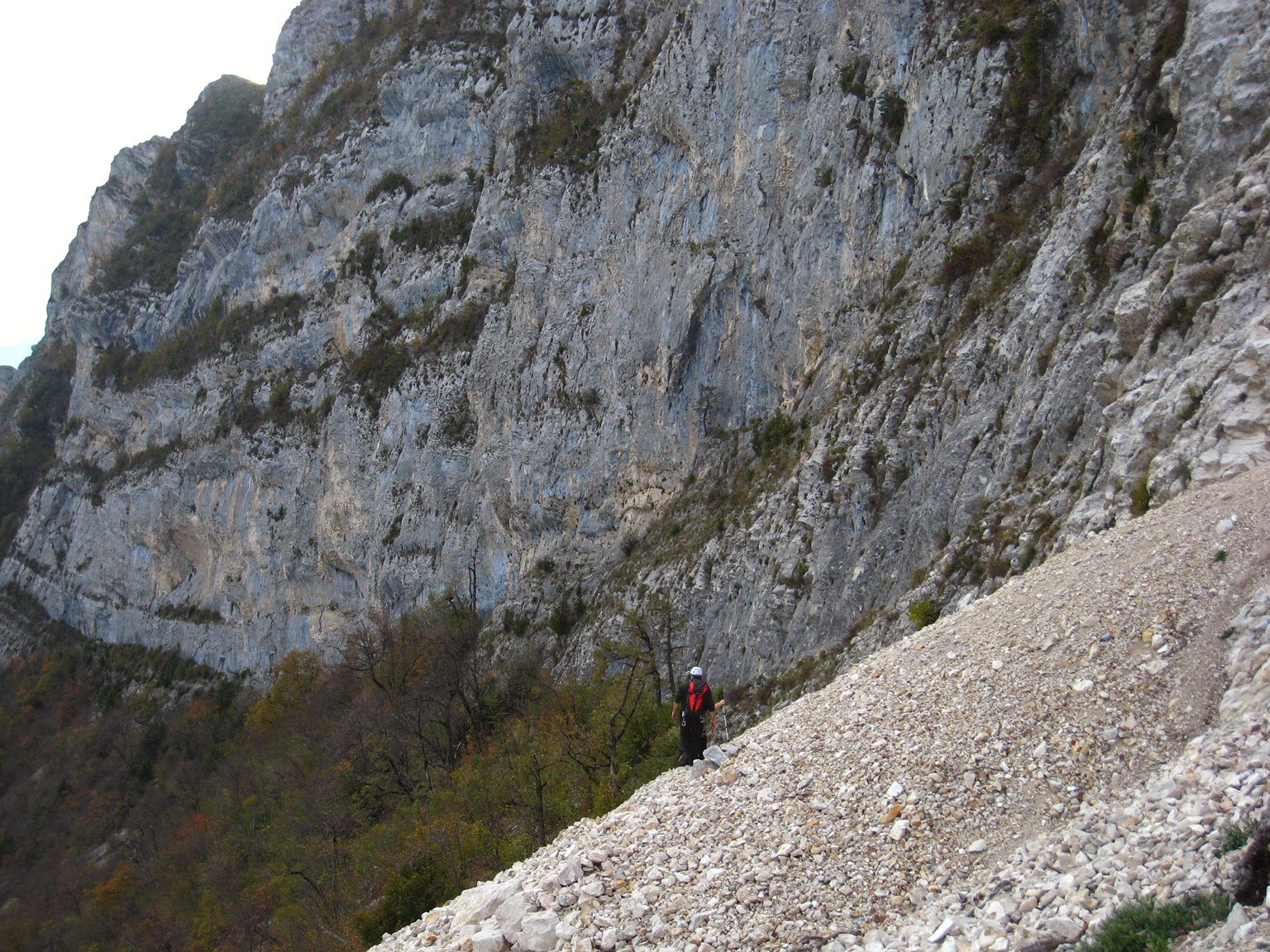
View of the scree at the foot of the eastern wall of the Néron, possible passage but not recommended for a return hike.

Several routes allow you to reach the Roman post via the Néron meadow from the Hermitage, or from the Muret in Saint-Égrève via the Fontaine Vierge and then the southern part of the Chemin des Charbonniers. The latter runs along the upper part of the walls of the western slope from north to south.

The ascent of Néron is also possible from the west. It has a difference in altitude of more than 1,050 metres but is more direct. The climb can be made via the Grand Saut, above the Saint-Egrève sports complex. A memorial plaque to Gunther Ullrich has been placed on the top of the walls. This passage is equipped with cables. It leads under the Avalanche corridor. You must then head north to reach the Ullrich ravine from where it is possible to branch off eastwards to take the Écureuil ridge, its northern edge. The path is marked out in blue and has cables in some areas. It leads directly to the north peak. From there, it is possible to reach the main peak, after a short crossing of the ridges from north to south but the need to cross the Ullrich ravine. Alternatively, the descent can be made on the western side after leaving the ridges between the Clémencières and Quaix corridors. Once above the rocky walls, at Ghy Chérie - a rock named by a young mountaineer from Les Vouillants, above Fontaine, in homage to his former beloved, after having opened several trails in the area in 1989 -, the return is made by the northern portion of the Chemin des Charbonniers, which can be followed as far as the Fontaine Vierge. This descent route can be done in a loop after crossing the ridges from south to north, with a return via the Néron meadow.

=== Climbing ===
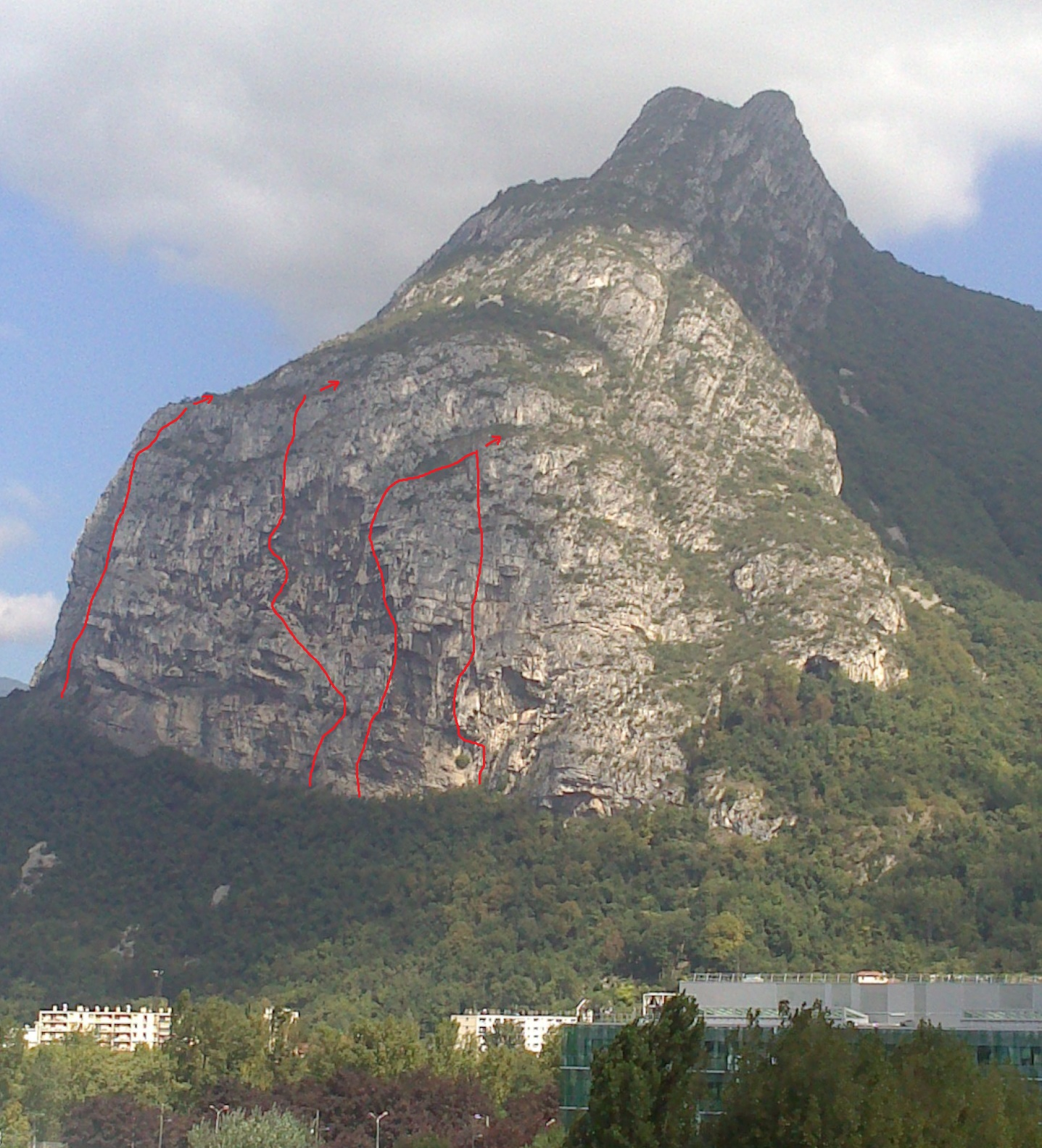
View of the southern end of the Néron with the paths in the wall comprising most of the mountain's climbing routes.

The southern end of the Néron ends in a southwest facing wall. Four main climbing routes have been opened here. From the valley, from left to right, are: the voie du Toit or dièdre des Rameaux, opened by P.-H. Alphonse and G. Claret on April 6, 1971, and rated 5c to 6a with a vertical drop of 150 to 180 metres; the Controverses route, opened by P.- H. Alphonse, C. Baudet, G. Claret, F. Diaferia and G. Groseil on 11 and 12 October 1969, and rated 5c to 6c with a vertical drop of 200 metres; the Direct route, opened in two stages, by C. Baudet, G. Claret and F. Diaferia in April 1971 for its upper part, initially called the Guillotine route, accessible after a short crossing from the Controverses route, then by G. Claret, M. Guérin and D. Serain on the 1 and 2 November 1976 for the lower part, the start of which is about thirty metres to the right of the Controverses route, the whole being rated 5c to 6c with a difference in altitude of 200 to 220 metres; finally, the Pentecost route, opened by G. Baldino, G. Claret and P.-A. Ubaud on 3 and 4 June 1979, and rated 6a with a difference in altitude of 200 metres. The latter route is largely shared with the more recently opened Nabuchodonosaurus. The two leftmost routes exit via Nero Meadow, while the others lead directly to the Hermitage ballme.

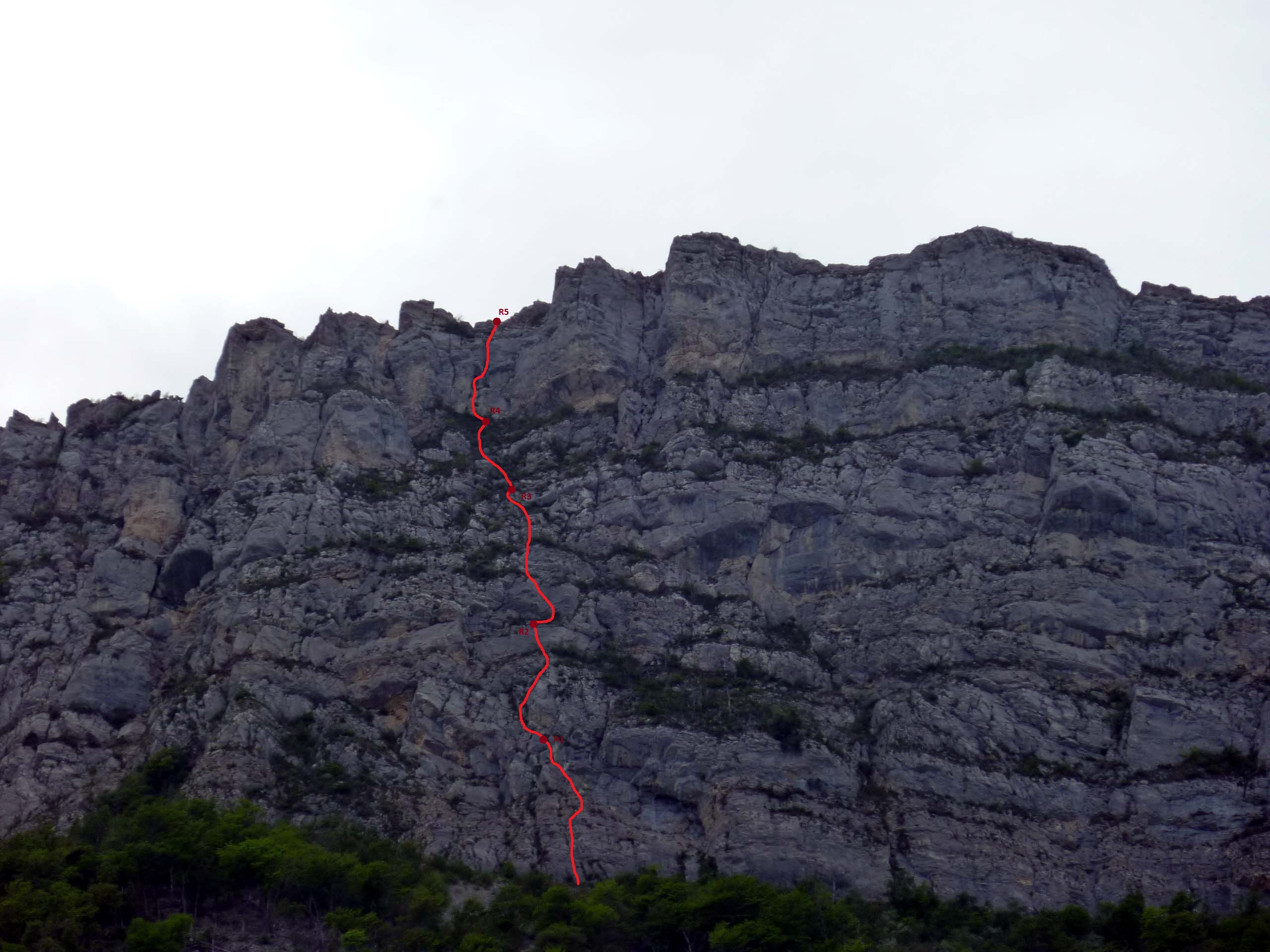
The voie des Coccinelles on the east face.

Some additional routes are present on the other sides of the mountain but are often poorly described. The Charbonniers route, on the western slope above the Muret, is rated 6a for a technical drop of 300 metres and leads near the Écureuil gap. Although the Godefroy corridor is now forbidden, the Rippert-Caillat corridor, named after its openers on June 1, 1922, offers an alternative 400 metres to the north to access the ridges from the west with comparable difficulties of around 4 and better rock. The Coccinelles route opened by L. and C. Chabert in May 2011 is also located on the east face; it is rated 5a for a technical drop of 180 metres in fragile rock. A route was also opened on the north face in November 1969 by J. Diju-Duval and C. Rey; the lights emitted during their bivouac, visible from Proveysieux, led to the intervention of a helicopter rescue team.

In addition, there are three sport climbing sites on the eastern slope of the Néron, accessible from the hamlet of Narbonne: the Narbonne site, the Goupil site and the so-called Roman camp.

=== Environmental protection ===
The Néron is located within the Chartreuse Regional Nature Park, which was created in 1995 and since the revision of its charter in 2008 covers 767 km^{2}. The mountain is also classified as a type I natural zone of ecological, faunistic and floristic interest (ZNIEFF), which covers 627 hectares.

== Popular culture ==
=== Painting ===
The Neron has been represented many times by Dauphin painters. In particular, a group of painters from the École dauphinoise who met at the instigation of Théodore Ravanat in Proveysieux frequently chose the Nero as the subject of paintings. Among the works representing him are:

- Théodore Ravanat, L'Aiguille de Quaix et le Casque du Néron, private collection;
- Charles Bertier, Bord de l'Isère à Grenoble. Le Néron, ca. 1900, Grenoble, Musée dauphinois, private collection;
- Charles Bertier, Effet de soir sur le Néron à Proveyzieux at Proveyzieux (two paintings of the same name, 1895, private collection);
- Charles Bertier, Vue sur la Chartreuse, le Casque du Néron et la Pinéa;
- Jean Achard, Vue de Saint-Egrève et de la Pinéa, prise de Sassenage, ca. 1849, private collection;
- Ernest Victor Hareux, Le Casque du Néron depuis la plaine du Drac;
- Ernest Victor Hareux, Le casque du Néron vue des rives du Drac;
- Alexandre Debelle, La cérémonie funèbre du 6 juillet 1848;
- William Turner, Près de Grenoble, le Néron et le mont Saint-Eynard vus du Drac;
- Johan Barthold Jongkind, Le Casque de Néron.

=== Music ===
The Néron is mentioned in the official march of the former free commune of La Monta, now in Saint-Égrève, entitled Sur les bords de la Vence, to lyrics by Robert Douillet set to music by Georges Allibert:

At the foot of the Néron helmet

Is a small town

It is the Monta and we love it

For like her there is only one.

[...]

Near the Néron,

On the banks of the Vence,

The lovers go two by two

With joyful hearts.

[...]

They know well that to please each other

Near the Vence or at the Prises

One sees the Néron upside down.

== Appendices ==
=== Related articles ===
- Geography of the Alps

=== Bibliography ===
- Simon, Claude (2002). Le Néron (in French). p. 352. ISBN 2951842708.
- Margueritat, Thierry (1999). Le Néron: histoire, itinéraires (in French). Grenoble: Éditeur Thierry Margueritat. p. 42. ISBN 2951394101.
- Lécuyer, Henri (2014). "Inventaire des sources et des cavités du massif du Néron". Scialet: Bulletin du CDS de l'Isère (in French) (43). Fédération française de spéléologie. Grenoble: Comité départemental de spéléologie de l'Isère: 89–96. ISSN 0336-0326.
- Lécuyer, Henri (2015). "Inventaire des sources et des cavités du massif du Néron - additif à l'article de Scialet n°43". Scialet: Bulletin du CDS de l'Isère (in French) (44). Fédération française de spéléologie. Grenoble: Comité départemental de spéléologie de l'Isère: 98–101. ISSN 0336-0326.

=== External links ===
- Néron on camptocamp.org
- Maurice Gidon, Géologie du Néron, « Un atlas géologique des Alpes françaises »
- Claude Simon, Le Néron - Monographie
