= Combleux =

Commune in Loiret, France

- Commune
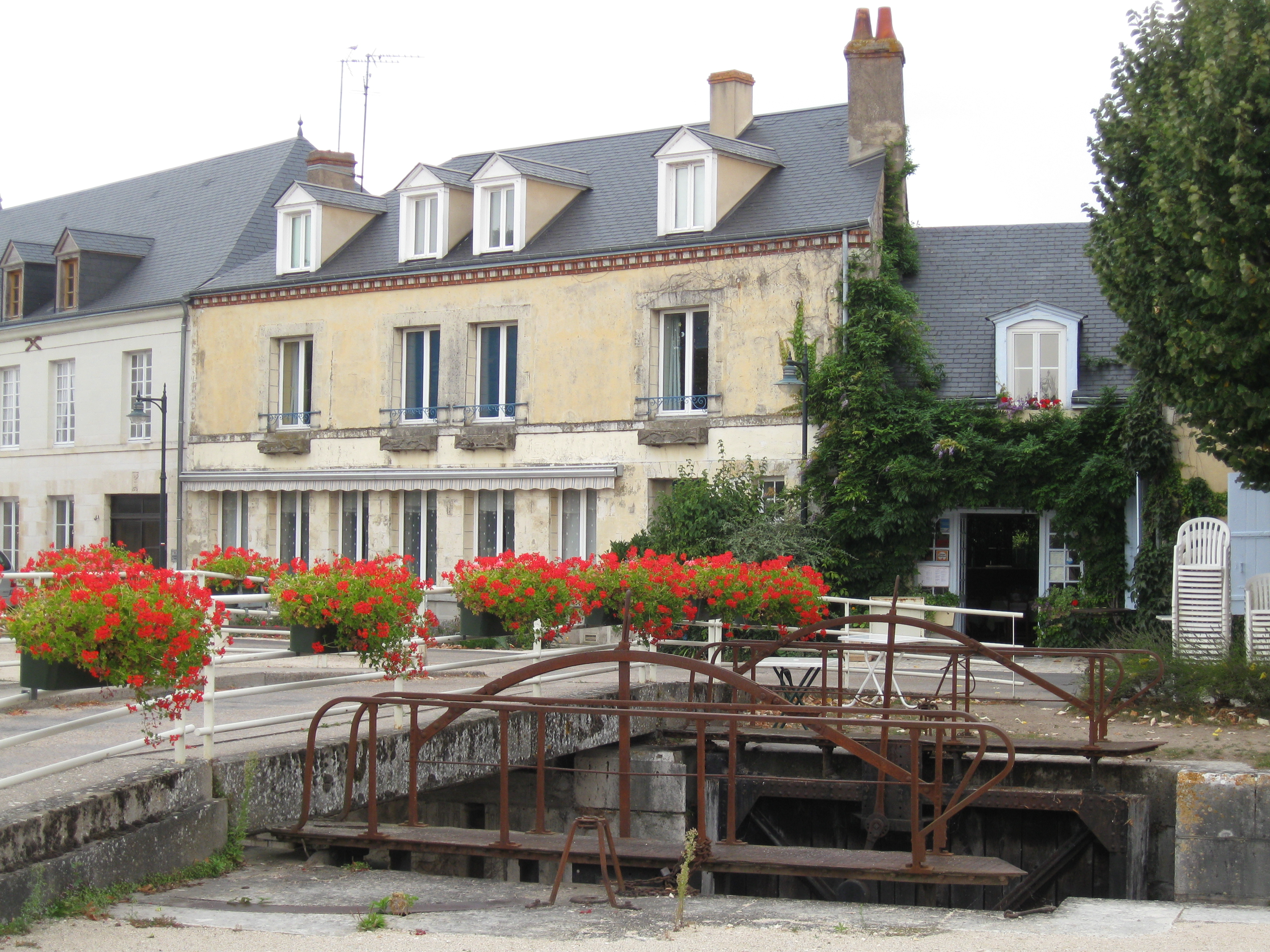
- The Orleans Canal at Combleux
- Location of Combleux
- Location within France Location within Centre-Val de Loire
- Coordinates: 47°54′01″N 1°59′29″E
- Country: France
- Region: Centre-Val de Loire
- Department: Loiret
- Arrondissement: Orléans
- Canton: Saint-Jean-de-Braye
- Intercommunality: Orléans Métropole

Government
  - Mayor (2020–2026): Francis Triquet
- Area^{1}: 1.1 km^{2} (0.42 sq mi)
- Highest elevation: 110 m (360 ft)
- Lowest elevation: 95 m (312 ft)
- Population (2023): 547
  - Density: 500/km^{2} (1,300/sq mi)
- Demonym(s): Combleusiennes, Combleusiens
- Time zone: UTC+01:00 (CET)
  - Summer (DST): UTC+02:00 (CEST)
- INSEE/Postal code: 45100 /45800
- ^{1} French Land Register data, which excludes lakes, ponds, glaciers > 1 km^{2} (0.386 sq mi or 247 acres) and river estuaries.

Combleux is a French commune located in the Loiret department in the Centre-Val de Loire region.

The commune is located within the perimeter of the Loire Valley inscribed on the World Heritage List of UNESCO. It is part of Orléans Métropole.

== Geography ==
=== Location ===
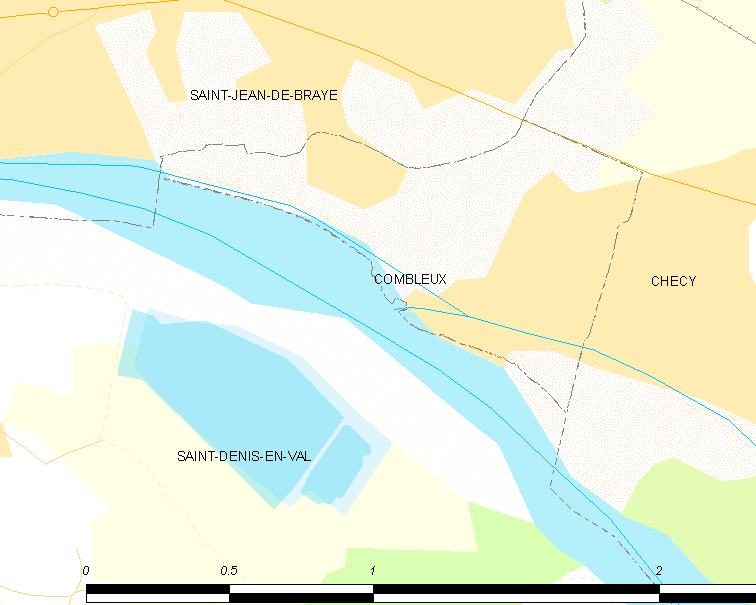
Map of the commune of Combleux and neighboring communes

The commune of Combleux is located in the center of the Loiret department, in the agricultural region of the Loire Valley and the urban area of Orléans. As the crow flies, it is situated 6.2 kilometres (3.9 mi) from Orléans, the prefecture of the department, and 2.7 kilometres (1.7 mi) from Chécy, the former chief town of the canton to which the commune belonged before March 2015. The commune is part of the living zone of Orléans.

The closest communes, with distances measured as the crow flies between chief towns, are: Saint-Jean-de-Braye (2 kilometres (1.2 mi)), Chécy (2.7 kilometres (1.7 mi)), Saint-Denis-en-Val (3.5 kilometres (2.2 mi)), Boigny-sur-Bionne (3.7 kilometres (2.3 mi)), Semoy (4.7 kilometres (2.9 mi)), Saint-Jean-le-Blanc (4.8 kilometres (3.0 mi)), Mardié (5.2 kilometres (3.2 mi)), Bou (5.2 kilometres (3.2 mi)), Orléans (6.2 kilometres (3.9 mi)) and Fleury-les-Aubrais (6.4 kilometres (4.0 mi)).

=== Geology and terrain ===
Geological map of the commune of Combleux. Fz : Recent alluvium from minor beds (Holocene) Fw : High terrace alluvium of the Loire (Pleistocene (Riss)) m2MCO : Marls and limestones of the Orléanais (Burdigalian) m1MBI : Marls of Blamont (Aquitanian) m1CPi : Limestones of Pithiviers (Aquitanian)

The Orléans region is located in the south of the Paris Basin, a vast basin composed of a stack of sedimentary layers of mainly detrital origins (from the erosion of ancient mountain chains) and carbonate (precipitation of calcium carbonate). These deposits range from the Triassic (- 250 million years) to the Pliocene (- 23 million years) and occur mainly in marine contexts, but also in lacustrine environments. The successions of glacial and interglacial periods during the Quaternary lead to the current geomorphological configuration: more or less deep alteration of the rocks in place, ancient alluvial terraces perched on the plateaus and incision of the current Loire valley

The Beauce limestones, which constitute the bedrock of the communal territory, formed during the Aquitanian (from -23 to -20.5 million years). The upper part of this formation, the Pithiviers limestones (m1CPi), the Blamont marls (m1MBI) and the marls and limestones of the Orléanais (m2MCO), occupy a large part of the commune. They are covered in their eastern part by high terrace alluvium of the Loire (Fw), dating from the Pleistocene. The rest of the communal territory is covered by recent alluvium and colluvium (Fz), dating from the Holocene.

Fragmented and fissured, the limestones can be the site of karstic phenomena. The preferential circulations of groundwater erode these limestones in depth and lead to the formation of depressions, sinkholes or dolines. Surface manifestations of these weaknesses are not rare in the Orléans region. One cavity was inventoried by the Centre regional service of the BRGM on the commune, in October 2003.

The communal territory is relatively flat since the maximum relief is 15 meters. The altitude of the territory varies indeed from 95 meters to 110 meters

=== Hydrography ===
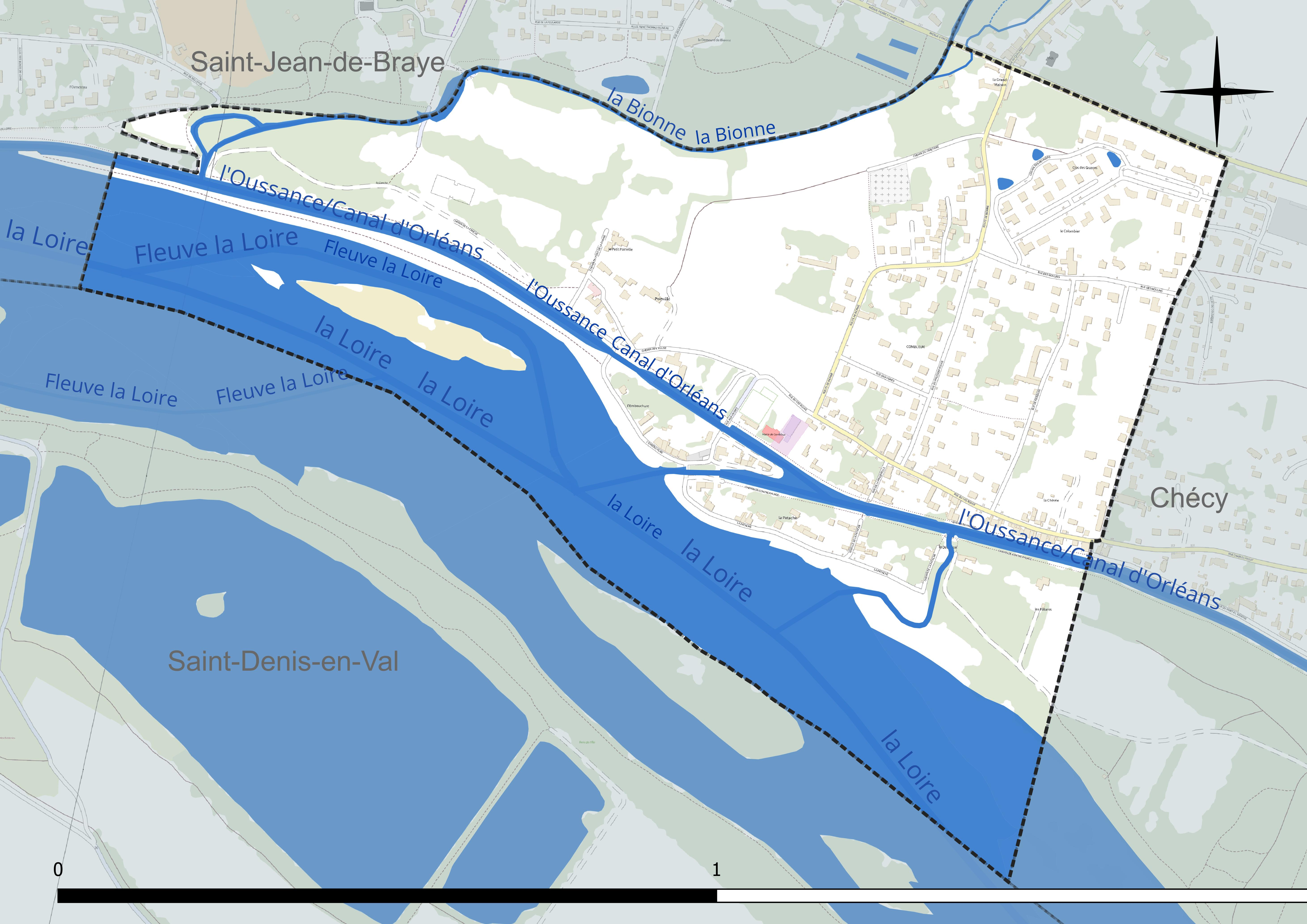
Hydrographic network of the commune

The commune is crossed by the Canal d'Orléans (1.624 kilometres (1.009 mi)) and the Loire (1.093 kilometres (0.679 mi)). The communal hydrographic network, with a total length of 6.95 kilometres (4.32 mi), includes two other notable watercourses, the Oussance (1.624 kilometres (1.009 mi)) and the Bionne (1.008 kilometres (0.626 mi)), and various small watercourses.

The course of the Loire fits into a wide valley that it has shaped little by little over thousands of years. It crosses the south of the Loiret department from Beaulieu-sur-Loire to Beaugency, with a wide and slow course. The Loire exhibits fairly marked seasonal flow fluctuations. The closest hydrometric station to the commune and serving as a reference in case of flood is that of Orléans, at the level of the George V Bridge. The average monthly flow (calculated over 55 years (1,700 Ms) for this station) varies from 96.80 cubic metres per second (3,418 cu ft/s) in the month of August to 600 cubic metres per second (21,000 cu ft/s) in the month of February. However, the Loire experiences very high flow peaks in case of exceptional bad weather, the maximum having been reached at this station on 8 December 2003 with 3,130 cubic metres per second (111,000 cu ft/s). The maximum flow of the Loire calculated for the maximum floods of 1856 or 1866 is on the order of 7,000 cubic metres per second (250,000 cu ft/s). Its flow is regulated by upstream dams (Naussac Dam upstream on the Allier and Villerest Dam). These dams intervene for low-flow support (minimum flow of 60 cubic metres per second (2,100 cu ft/s) in low water at Gien) and Villerest also allows cresting floods. The Loire is a domanial watercourse classified as a second category fish river. The dominant biological species consists mainly of white fish (cyprinids) and predators (pike, zander and perch). Since the 1990s this type of river has also been populated by wels catfish.

The Oussance, or Cens, with a total length of 19.9 kilometres (12.4 mi), rises in the commune of Nibelle and flows into the Canal d'Orléans at Orléans, after crossing 11 communes

The Bionne, with a total length of 18.9 kilometres (11.7 mi), forms the northwestern limit of the commune. It rises in the commune of Loury and flows into the Canal d'Orléans at Saint-Jean-de-Braye, after crossing 7 communes. On the fish plan, the Bionne is classified as second category fish.

=== Climate ===
In 2010, the climate of the commune was classified as a degraded oceanic climate of the central and northern plains, according to a CNRS study based on data covering the 1971–2000 period. In 2020, Météo-France published a typology of the climates of metropolitan France in which the commune is exposed to an altered oceanic climate and is located in the climatic region Middle Loire Valley, characterized by good sunshine (1,850 hours per year (211 ks/Ms)) and a relatively dry summer.

For the 1971–2000 period, the average annual temperature is 11 °C (52 °F), with an annual thermal amplitude of 15.5 °C (59.9 °F). The average annual precipitation is 682 millimetres (26.9 in), with 11.3 days (980 ks) of precipitation in January and 7.2 days (620 ks) in July. For the 1991–2020 period, the average annual temperature observed at the weather station of Météo-France closest to the commune, located in Fleury-les-Aubrais at 6 kilometres (3.7 mi) as the crow flies, is 11.7 °C (53.1 °F) and the average annual precipitation is 728.8 millimetres (28.69 in). For the future, the climate parameters of the commune estimated for 2050 according to different greenhouse gas emission scenarios are available on a dedicated website published by Météo-France in November 2022.

=== Sites and landscapes ===
==== UNESCO World Heritage ====
On 30 November 2000, the Loire Valley, in its middle course from Sully-sur-Loire (Loiret) to Chalonnes-sur-Loire (Maine-et-Loire), was inscribed on the World Heritage List of the United Nations Educational, Scientific and Cultural Organization (UNESCO) as a "cultural landscape". This inscription recognizes the site’s "outstanding universal value" based on the density of its monumental, architectural, and urban heritage, the interest of the river landscape, and the exceptional quality of landscape expressions inherited from the Renaissance and the Age of Enlightenment. Any alteration of this outstanding universal value is considered a loss to the memory of humanity. The prefect of the Centre region, coordinating prefect, approved the management plan for the Loire Valley World Heritage by decree on 15 November 2012. Thirty-five communes in Loiret are concerned, including Combleux, which has a portion of its territory inscribed and the rest in the buffer zone.

==== Classified site ====
The site known as "Combleux site" is classified under the Law of 2 May 1930 (Note: Classification is a strong protection that corresponds to a desire to strictly maintain the designated site in its current state, which does not exclude management and enhancement. Changes are therefore possible, but a classified site cannot be destroyed or modified in its state or appearance except with the express authorization of the relevant minister or prefect (for works not subject to building permits and for fence modifications) after the opinion of the architect of the Buildings of France.) by a decree of 14 October 1988. Covering a total area of 285 hectares, it concerns the communes of Combleux, Saint-Jean-de-Braye, Chécy, Saint-Denis-en-Val, Saint-Jean-le-Blanc, and Orléans. It is considered the richest in terms of landscape within the Orléans agglomeration, at the heart of the green corridor that crosses the area of the Orléans master plan for development and urban planning from east to west.

=== Natural environment and biodiversity ===
The Loire at Combleux has sandbanks that provide nesting sites for birds; fairly wild Loire woodlands also occupy the banks and contribute to ecological diversity. The Loire is protected or listed under various classifications and regulations in Combleux.

==== Natura 2000 sites ====
The Natura 2000 network is a European ecological network of natural sites of ecological interest established under the Habitats Directive and Birds Directive. This network consists of Special Areas of Conservation (SACs) and Special Protection Areas (SPAs). Within these zones, Member States commit to maintaining the relevant habitats and species in a favorable conservation status through regulatory, administrative, or contractual measures. The goal is to promote appropriate habitat management while considering the economic, social, cultural, and regional or local characteristics of each Member State. Human activities are not prohibited, provided they do not significantly compromise the favorable conservation status of the habitats and species concerned.

There are two Natura 2000 sites within the communal territory of Combleux.

Name	Number	Type	Decree	Area	Description
Vallée de la Loire de Tavers à Belleville-sur-Loire	FR2400528	SIC (Habitats Directive)	13 April 2007	7,120 hectares (17,600 acres)	The site covers 51 communes. The delimitation of this Natura 2000 site is very similar to that of the Birds Directive. The primary interest of the site lies in the Loire habitats linked to the river’s dynamics, which host numerous species listed in Annex II of the Habitats Directive. It is located in the eastern and southern parts of the commune.
Vallée de la Loire du Loiret	FR2410017	SPA (Birds Directive)	4 May 2007	7,684 hectares (18,990 acres)	The site covers the Loire Valley in the Loiret department. This SPA extends upstream and downstream into neighboring departments. The primary interest of the site lies in the Loire habitats and species linked to the river’s dynamics. These habitats host numerous species listed in Annex I of the Birds Directive. The site is characterized by nesting colonies of little tern, common tern, and Mediterranean gull. Fishing sites for the osprey are also present. The site is also a breeding ground for the black-crowned night heron, little egret, honey buzzard, black kite, stone-curlew, kingfisher, black woodpecker, and red-backed shrike. It is located in the eastern and southern parts of the commune.

Selection of bird species from the Natura 2000 zone 'Vallée de la Loire du Loiret'.

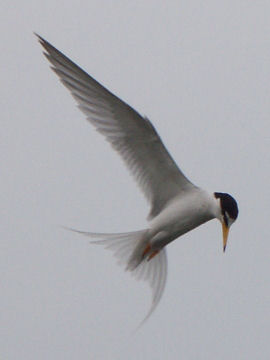
Little tern

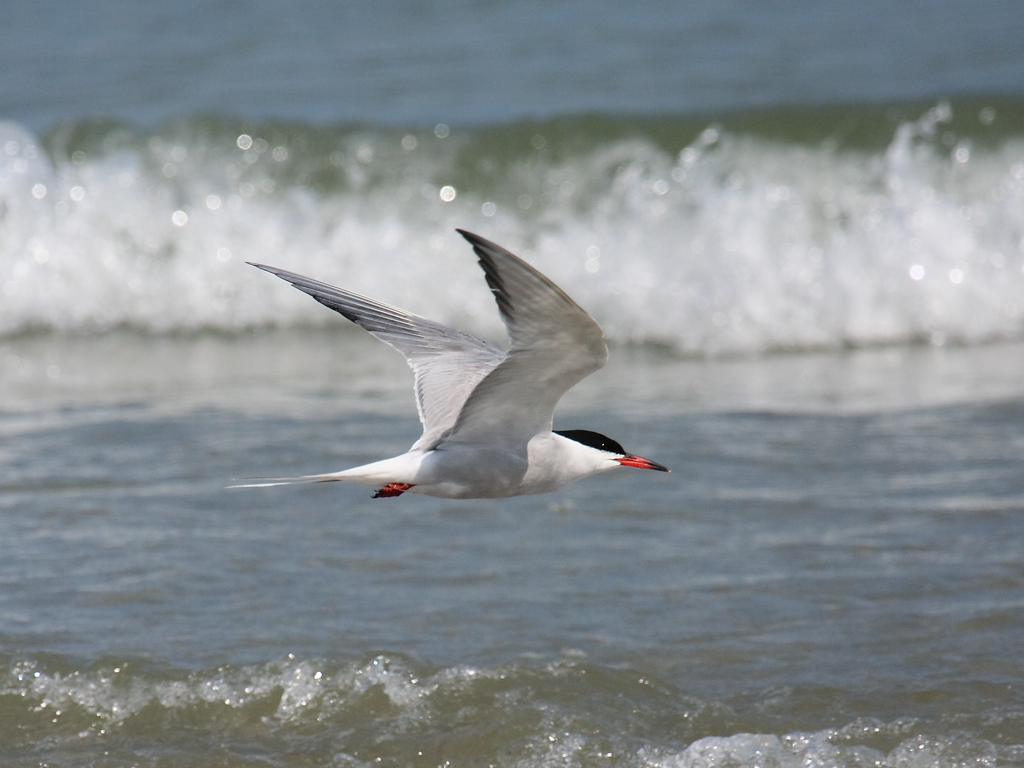
Common tern

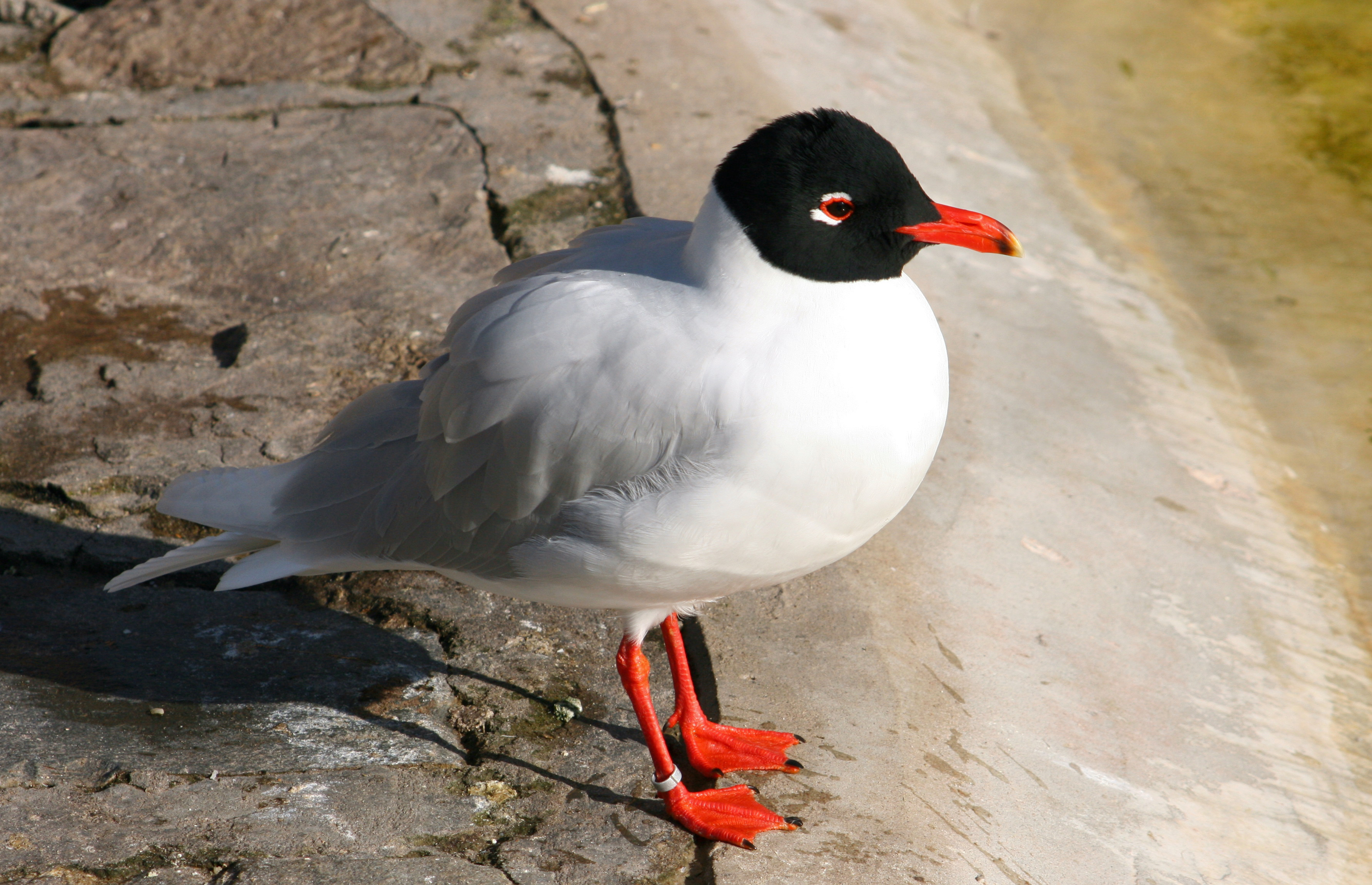
Mediterranean gull

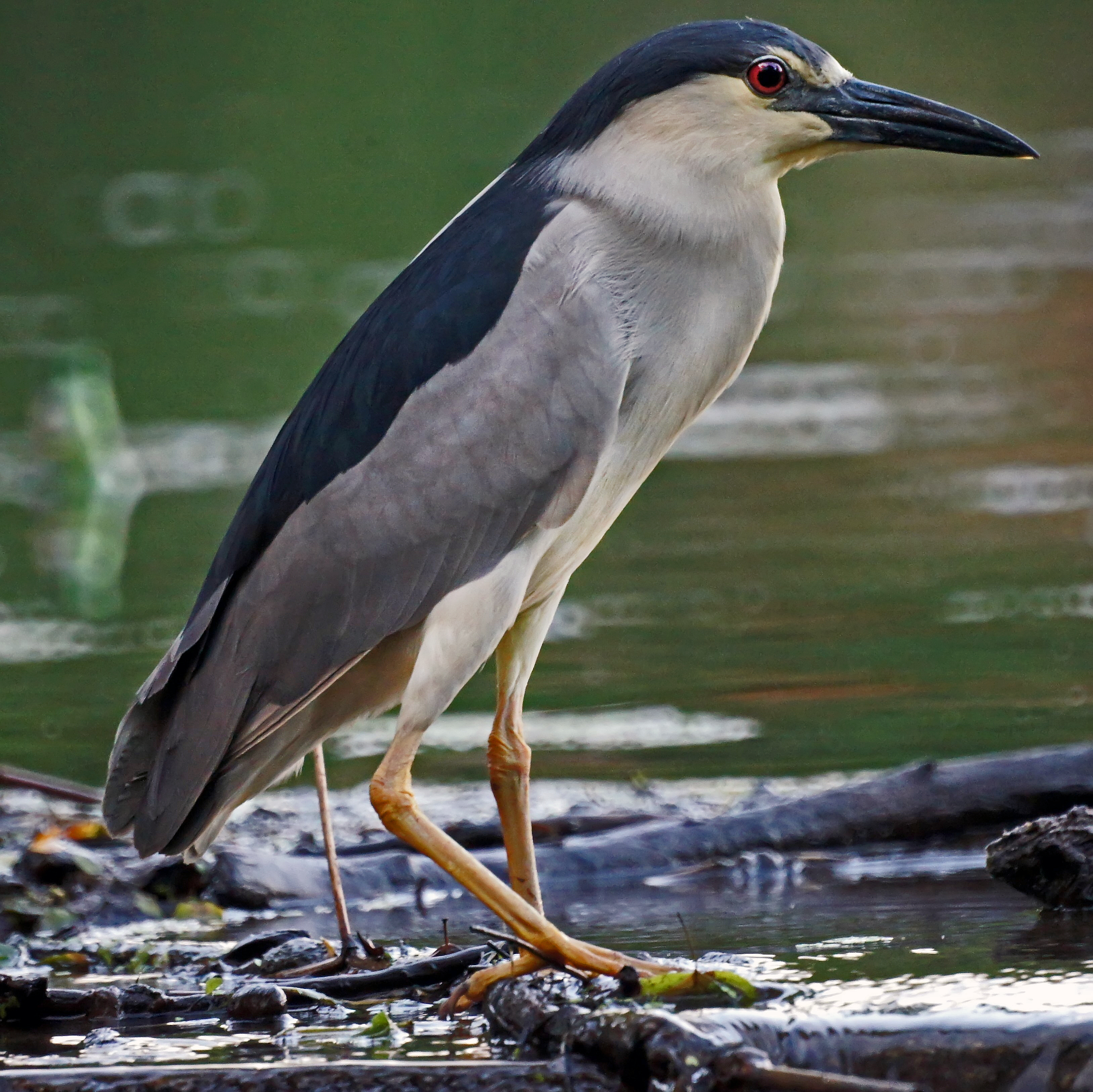
Black-crowned night heron

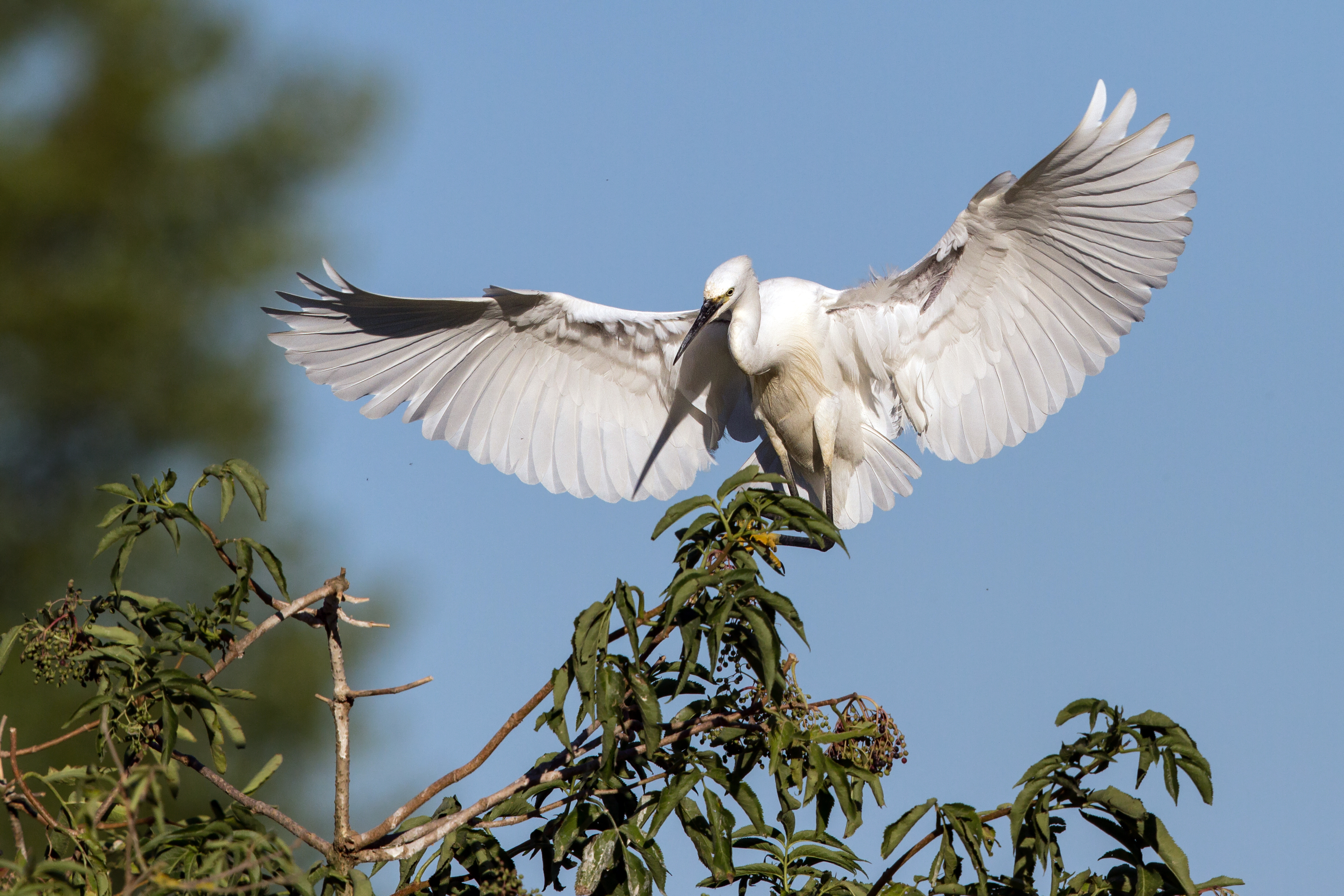
Little egret

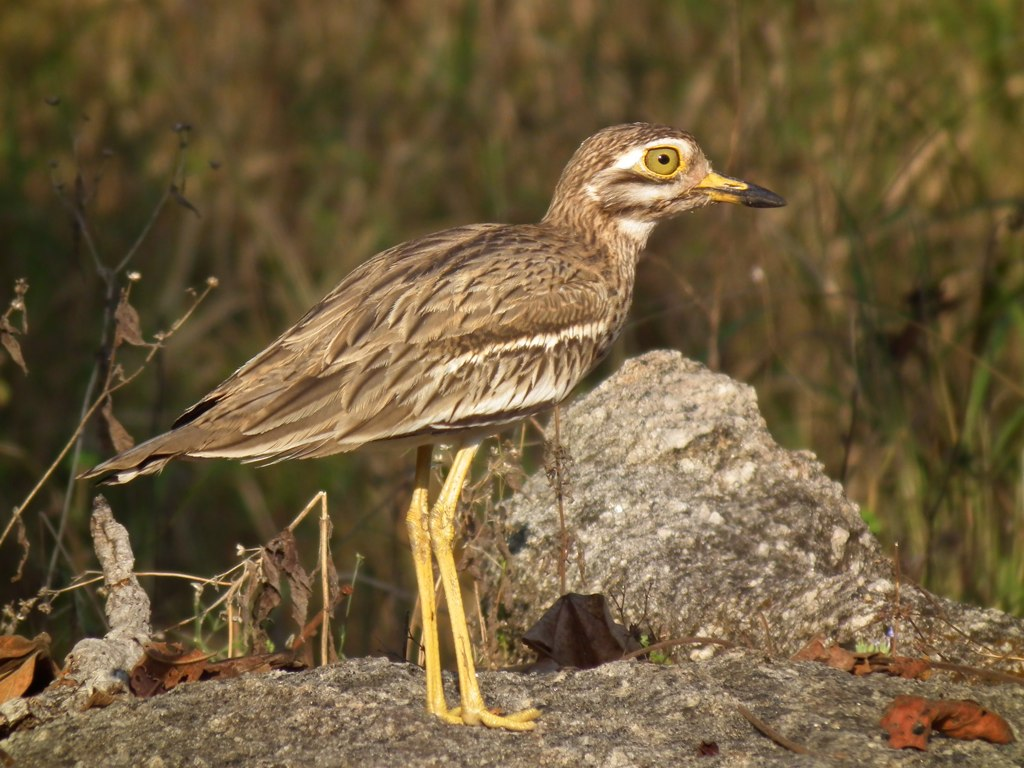
Eurasian stone-curlew

==== National zones of ecological, faunal, and floral interest ====
The inventory of Natural Zones of Ecological, Faunal, and Floral Interest (ZNIEFF) aims to identify the most ecologically significant areas, primarily to enhance knowledge of the national natural heritage and provide decision-makers with a tool to consider environmental factors in land-use planning. The communal territory of Combleux includes two ZNIEFFs: "Island and banks of Combleux" and "The Orléans Loire".

==== Ville fleurie label ====
The town holds the Ville fleurie label with two flowers awarded by the National Council of Towns and Villages in Bloom of France at the Competition of Towns and Villages in Bloom.

== Urban planning ==
=== Typology ===
As of 1 January 2024, Combleux is categorized as an urban belt, according to the new seven-level communal density grid defined by the Insee in 2022.

It belongs to the urban unit of Orléans, (Note: An urban unit in France is a commune or group of communes with a continuous built-up area (no gap of more than 200 meters (660 ft) between two constructions) and at least 2,000 inhabitants. A commune must have more than half its population within this built-up area.) an intra-departmental agglomeration comprising 19 communes, of which Combleux is a suburb. (Note: In a multi-communal agglomeration, a commune is considered a suburb when it is not the central city, meaning its population is less than 50% of the agglomeration’s population or that of the most populous commune. The urban unit of Orléans includes one central city and 18 suburban communities.) Additionally, the commune is part of the area of attraction of Orléans, where it is classified as a commune of the crown. (Note: The concept of area of attraction of cities replaced the former urban area in October 2020 to enable consistent comparisons with other European Union countries.) This area, which includes 136 communes, is categorized among areas with 200,000 to fewer than 700,000 inhabitants.

=== Land use ===
The land use of the commune, as derived from the European biophysical land cover database Corine Land Cover (CLC), is marked by the significance of artificialized areas (49.5% in 2018), an increase from 1990 (35.7%). The detailed breakdown in 2018 is as follows: urbanized areas (49.5%), continental waters (Note: Continental waters refer to all surface waters, generally freshwater from rainwater, located inland.) (25.4%), heterogeneous agricultural areas (25%).

The evolution of the commune’s land use and infrastructure can be observed through various cartographic representations of the territory: the Cassini map (18th century), the État-Major map (1820–1866), and the maps or aerial photographs of the IGN for the current period (1950 to present).

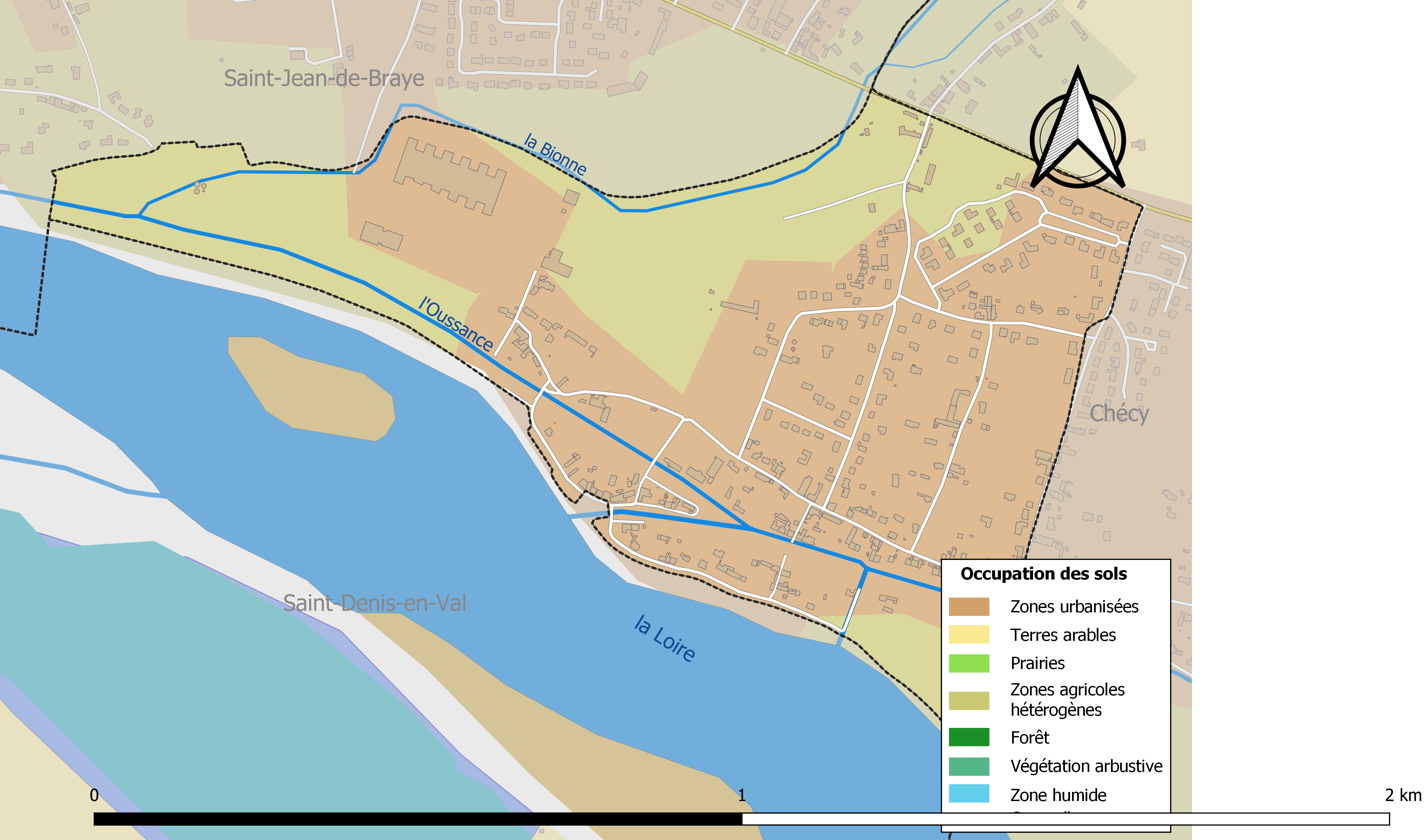
Map of infrastructure and land use of the commune in 2018 (CLC).

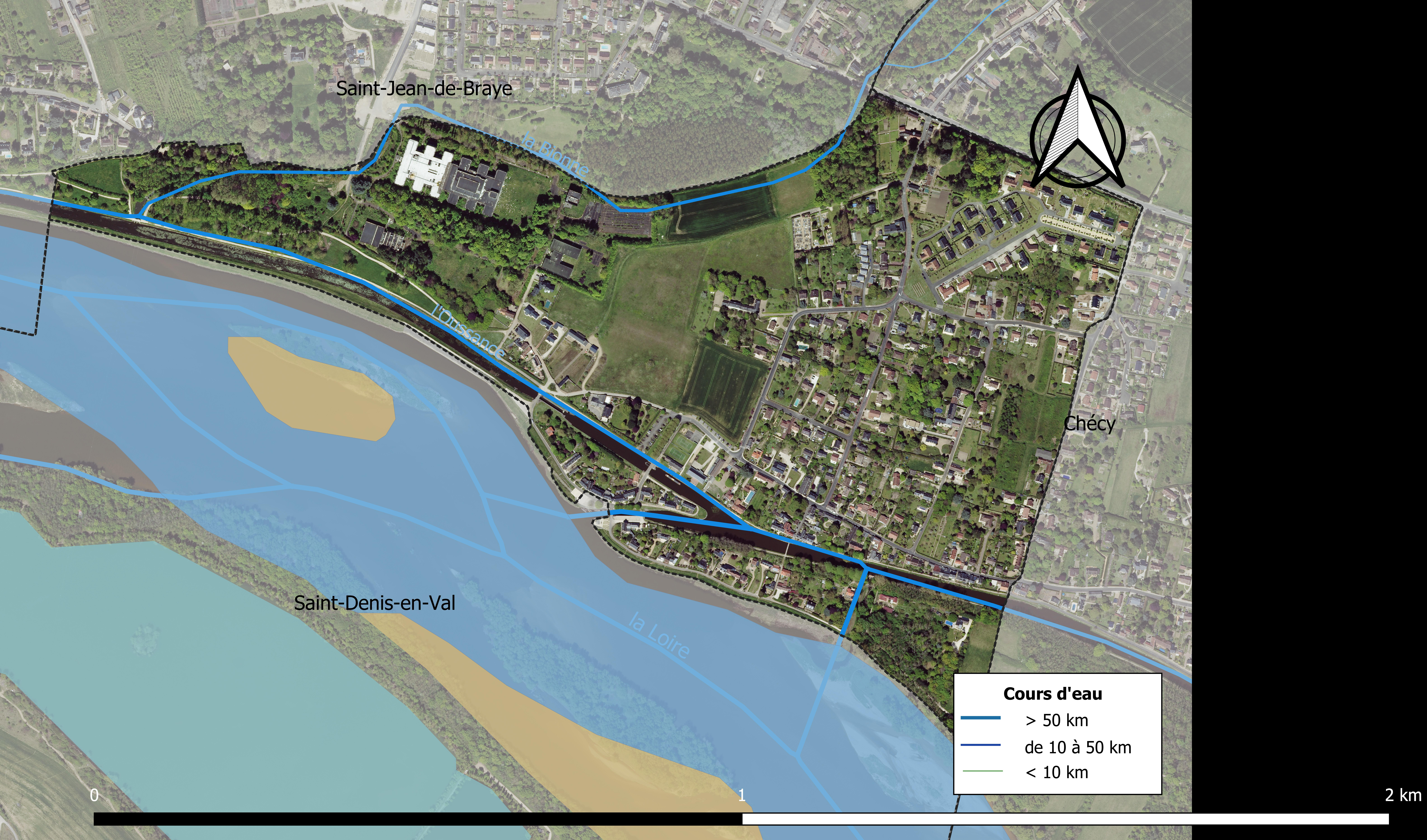
Orthophotographic map of the commune in 2016.

=== Communication routes and transport ===
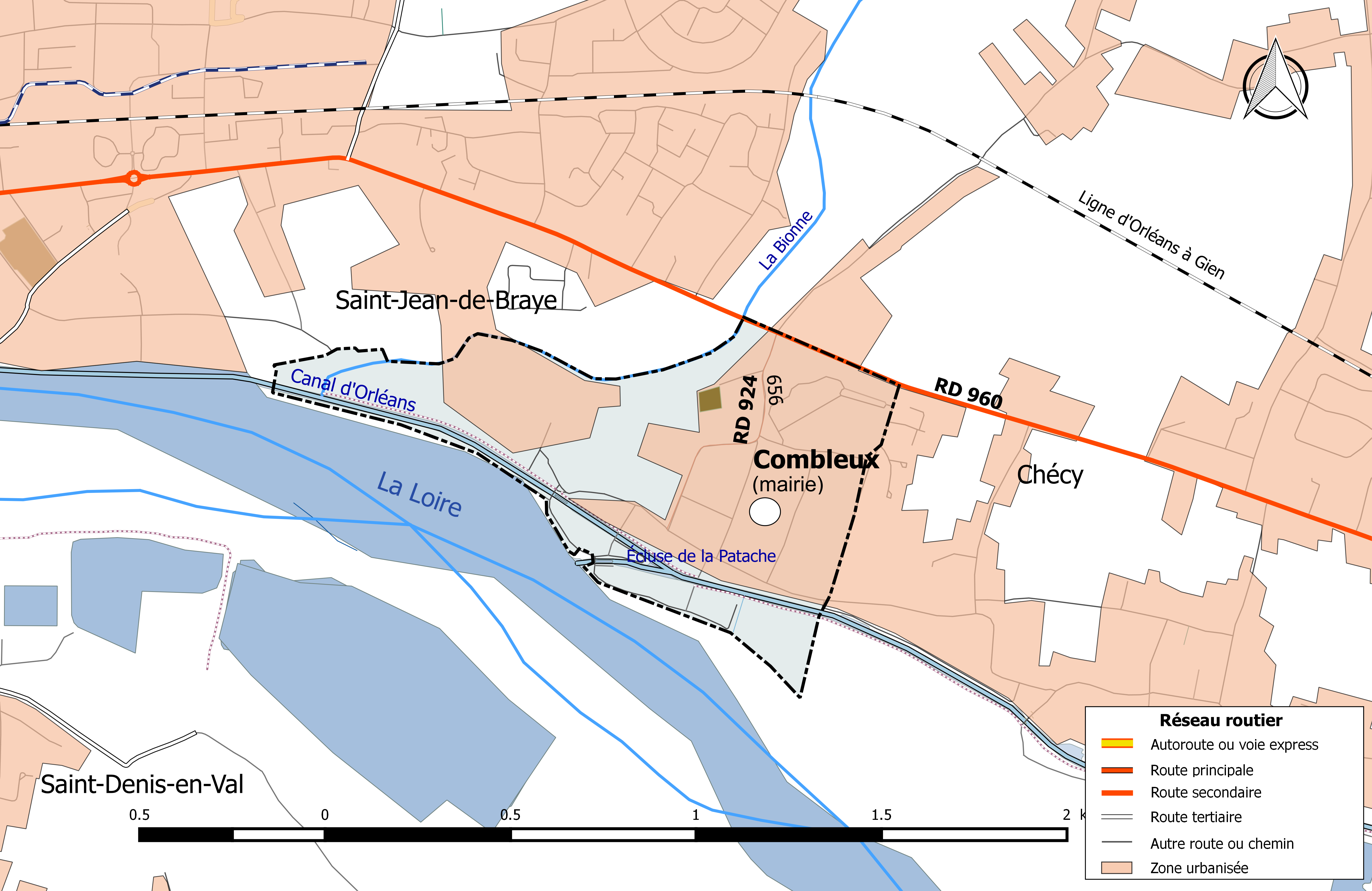
Main road network of the commune of Combleux (with indication of 2014 road traffic).

==== Road infrastructure ====
Combleux is crossed by one departmental road: the RD 924.

==== Public transport ====
- The Orléans Line 8 serves the town to transport students to Jacques Monod High School in Saint-Jean-de-Braye.
- On-demand transport (Résa’tao).

=== Major natural and technological risks ===
The commune of Combleux is vulnerable to various natural hazards: floods (from the overflow of the Loire or streams), climatic (exceptional winter or heatwave), ground movements, or seismic. It is also exposed to a technological risk: the transport of hazardous materials. Between 1999 and 2016, two ministerial decrees recognizing a state of natural disaster were issued for the commune of Combleux due to floods and mudflows.

==== Flood risk ====
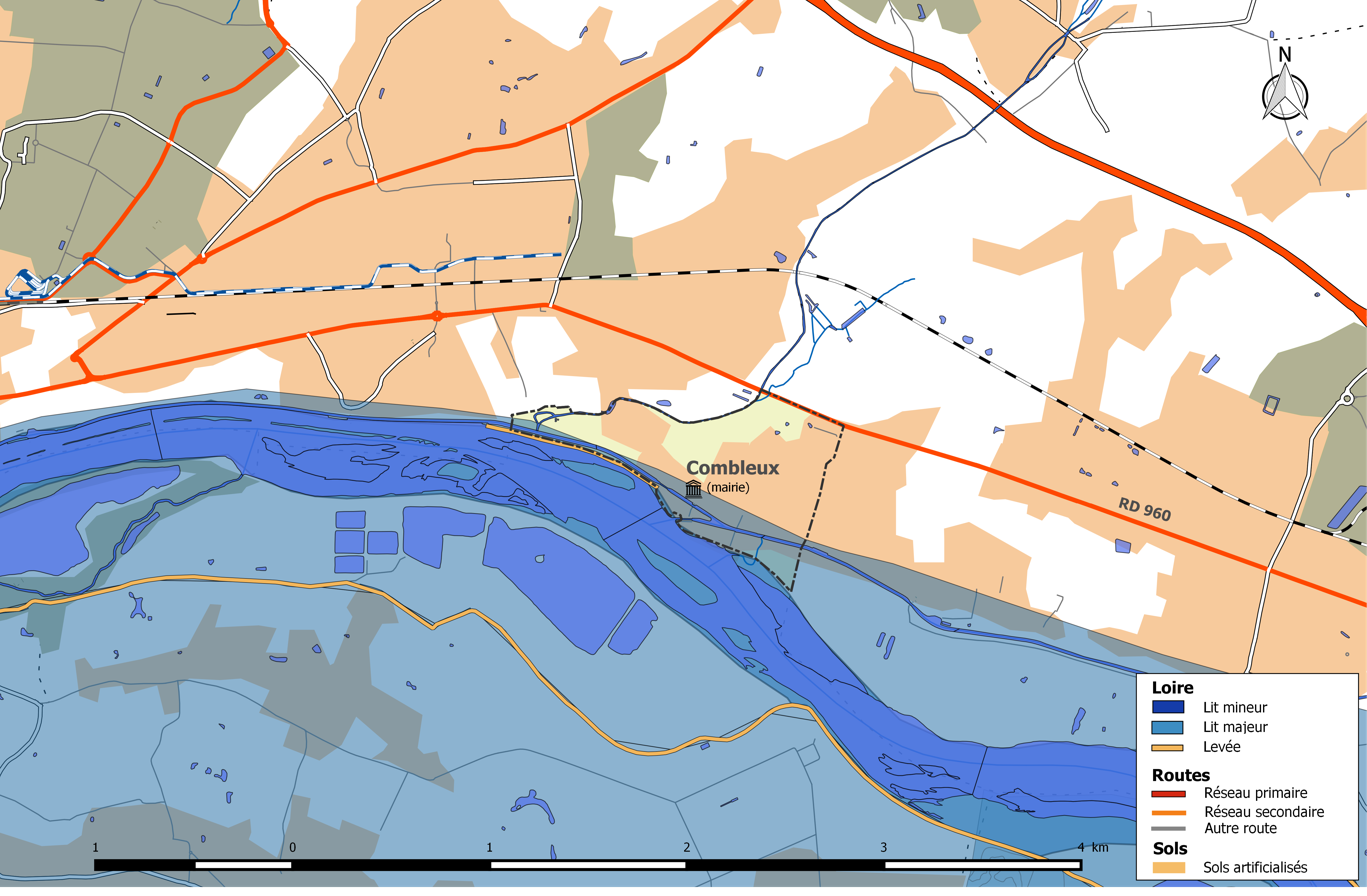
Flood zone of the commune of Combleux.

The Loire is the source of the most significant damage in the commune during major floods. Historical floods occurred in 1846, 1856, 1866, and 1907. No flood since 1907 has reached the heights of these catastrophic events.

The flood zone of the commune is part of the Orléans valley, which extends over 33 kilometres (21 mi) in length, from the hamlet of Bouteille upstream to the confluence of the Loiret downstream. This valley is protected by an earthen levee, the Orléans levee, 45 kilometres (28 mi) long, interrupted about 3.5 kilometres (2.2 mi) upstream of the confluence of the Loiret. It is flooded by the backwater of the Loire at the Loiret confluence from the earliest simulated floods. This levee has been reinforced along its entire length. The historical protection level was set by the construction of the Jargeau spillway, built at the end of the 19th century at the site of breaches that occurred in 1846, 1856, and 1866, and designed to operate beyond a Loire level at the Orléans scale close to 6 metres (20 ft) (1825 flood, which did not cause breaches). However, flood water levels have changed significantly since then due to the morphological evolution of the Loire’s bed, a consequence of 19th-century navigation works and massive material extraction in the latter half of the 20th century. The spillway no longer fulfills its role of protecting the Orléans levee from overflows and cannot define the protection objective of the levee system.

The analysis conducted as part of the levee hazard study shows that today, the apparent protection level of the levee corresponds to a flood with a return period of about 200 years (6,300 Ms), or a water height at the Orléans scale estimated at 5.75 metres (18.9 ft). Probable overflow zones identified extend from upstream to downstream at Guilly, Tigy, and Saint-Denis-en-Val (Château Lumina locality). Furthermore, these studies indicate that failures before overflow are likely, particularly at Guilly, Tigy, and Saint-Pryvé-Saint-Mesmin. For the Guilly sector, the probability of failure is no longer negligible from a flood with a return period of 70 years (2,200 Ms), corresponding to a level of about 4.60 metres (15.1 ft) at the Orléans scale. This level defines the current safety threshold of the Orléans levee and serves as the trigger for the mass evacuation plan for the Orléans agglomeration in case of a flood.

Two documents outline crisis management and rescue organization procedures: at the departmental level, the specialized ORSEC plan triggered in case of Loire flooding, the ORSIL plan, (Note: ORSIL = Organization of Rescue in Case of Loire Flooding.) and at the communal level, the Communal safeguard plan.

==== Risk of ground movements ====
The communal territory may be subject to the risk of collapse of unknown underground cavities. A departmental mapping of the inventory of underground cavities and surface disorders has been conducted. Several cavity collapses have been recorded in the commune. Additionally, the commune’s soil may experience ground movements due to drought. The phenomenon of clay shrinkage-swelling results from changes in soil moisture. Clays can absorb available water but also lose it by shrinking during drought. This phenomenon can cause significant damage to buildings (cracks, deformation of openings), rendering some structures uninhabitable. It particularly affected Loiret after the 2003 summer heatwave. The entire communal territory is subject to a "low" hazard level for this risk, according to the scale defined by the BRGM.

==== Transport of hazardous materials ====
The risk of transport of hazardous materials may arise from an accident involving a mobile unit (e.g., a truck) or a pipeline carrying hazardous materials (toxic, flammable, etc.). A hazardous material is a substance that may pose a danger and have serious consequences for humans and the environment. In Combleux, the primary risk factor is road transport along the RD 2060.

== Toponymy ==
There are two hypotheses regarding the origin of the name Combleux. The first derives the name from the Latin root cumulus (a heap, mound, summit, or hillock), suggesting that the original hamlet was built on a height. Combleux would thus be an ancient cumulosum (the place of the hill). This would be a logical location for a village, as a dominant position allowed for spotting approaching enemies from afar and facilitated defense against aggressors.

The second hypothesis considers Combleux as an ancient combor(o)-ialo, meaning a "field near the confluence." Toponyms ending in –ialo typically indicate villages of clearers, serfs, or workers sent to cultivate new lands and establish small colonies during periods of overpopulation. In Gaulish, ialo originally meant "cleared glade in a forest." As these clearings were generally intended to create new arable land, the term soon came to mean "field," and by extension, these clearer villages that became farming communities were often called ialo. A third, more whimsical theory suggested Combleux as the "valley of the wolf," from "combe du leu," with leu being the medieval term for wolf, preserved in the French expression "à la queue leu leu" (in single file). This theory was based on medieval texts mentioning several wolf attacks from the Orléans forest targeting the area’s inhabitants.

The name is documented in various records: de Comblosio in 1181–1182, La paroisse de Combleux in September 1377, Combleux on 30 June 1378, Combleux in 1740, and in the 18th century on the Cassini map or in 1801, in the decree of 5 Vendémiaire Year IX reducing the number of justices of the peace in the Loiret department.

== History ==
=== French Revolution and Empire ===
==== New territorial organization ====
Cantons, as administrative divisions, were abolished by a law of 26 June 1793, retaining only an electoral role for electing second-degree electors tasked with appointing deputies. The Constitution of the Year III, applied from Vendémiaire Year IV (1795), abolished districts, seen as administrative mechanisms linked to the Terror, but maintained cantons, which then gained greater importance by resuming an administrative function. Finally, under the Consulate, a territorial redistricting aimed at reducing the number of justices of the peace in France reduced the number of cantons in Loiret from 58 to 31. (Note: The suppression of one Orléans canton by the law of 8 Pluviôse Year IX (17 February 1800) reduced the initial number of cantons from 59 to 58.) Combleux was then attached to the canton of Chécy and the Arrondissement of Orléans by decree of 9 Vendémiaire Year X (1 October 1801). In 1806, the commune was attached to the canton of Orléans-Nord-Est, a new canton formed from one commune of the former canton of Ingré (abolished), seven communes from the canton of Neuville, and three from the canton of Patay. This organization remained unchanged until 1973, when the commune was attached to the Canton of Saint-Jean-de-Braye, then in 1982, it rejoined the Canton of Chécy.

=== Contemporary era ===
From 1966 to 2005, the company IBM operated a site spanning the communes of Combleux and Saint-Jean-de-Braye. In 2016, the commune of Combleux purchased the site, demolished most of the former IBM buildings, and began planning a redevelopment project that includes the construction of new housing.

== Politics and administration ==
=== Territorial division ===
The commune of Combleux is a member of the intercommunality Orléans Métropole, a public establishment of intermunicipal cooperation (EPCI) with its own taxation created on 1 January 2002, with its headquarters in Orléans. This entity is also part of other intermunicipal groupings. In 2020, these include the SM for the development of air services in western Loiret (SMAEDAOL), the SM for the Bionne and Cens river basins, and the SMAH for the Retrêve basin and its tributary, the Renard stream.

Administratively, it is attached to the Arrondissement of Orléans, the department of Loiret, and the region of Centre-Val de Loire. Electorally, it depends on the Canton of Saint-Jean-de-Braye for the election of departmental councilors, following the cantonal redistricting of 2014 effective in 2015, and on the Loiret's 6th constituency for legislative elections, following the last electoral redistricting of 2010.

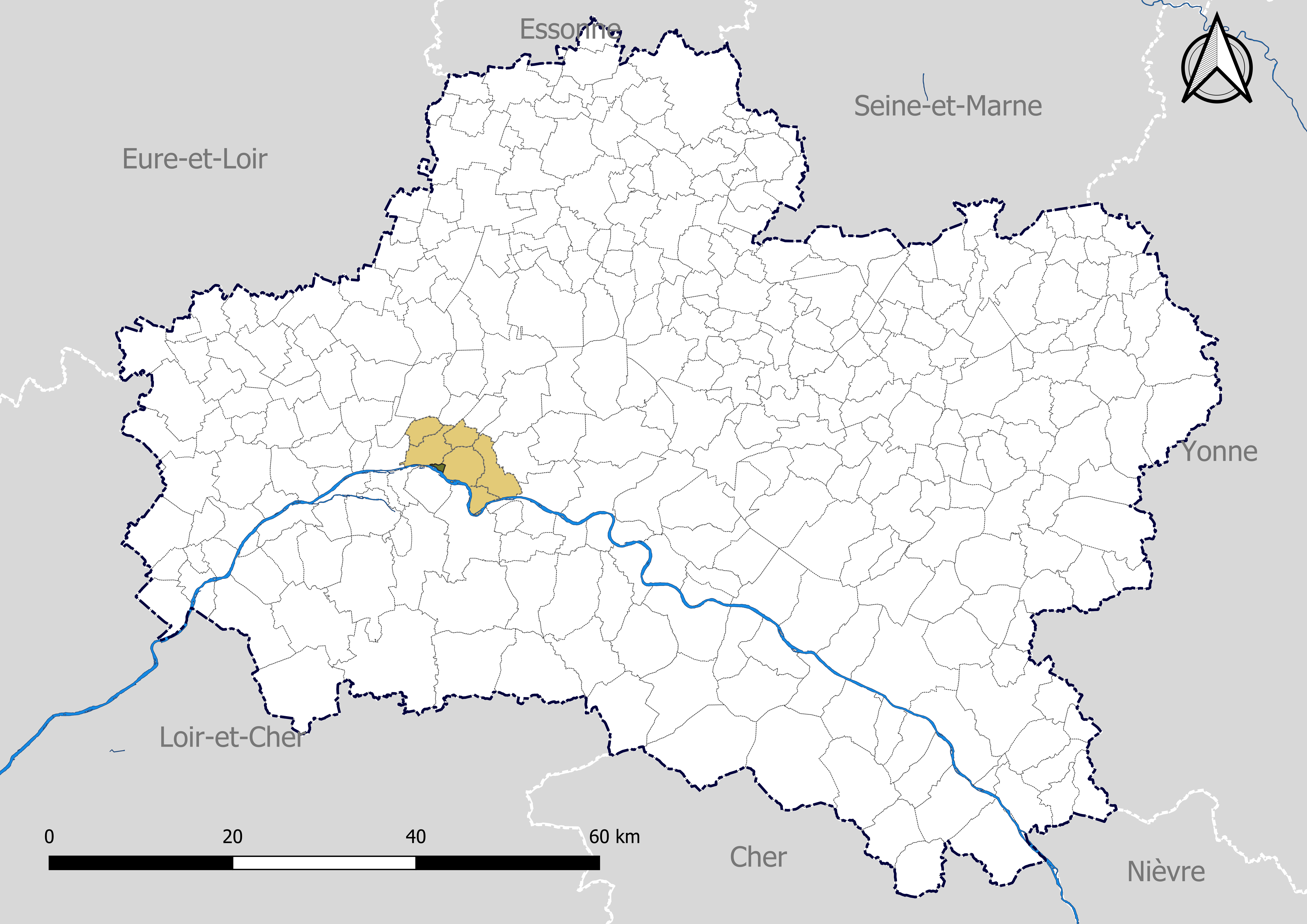
Combleux in the Canton of Saint-Jean-de-Braye in 2020.

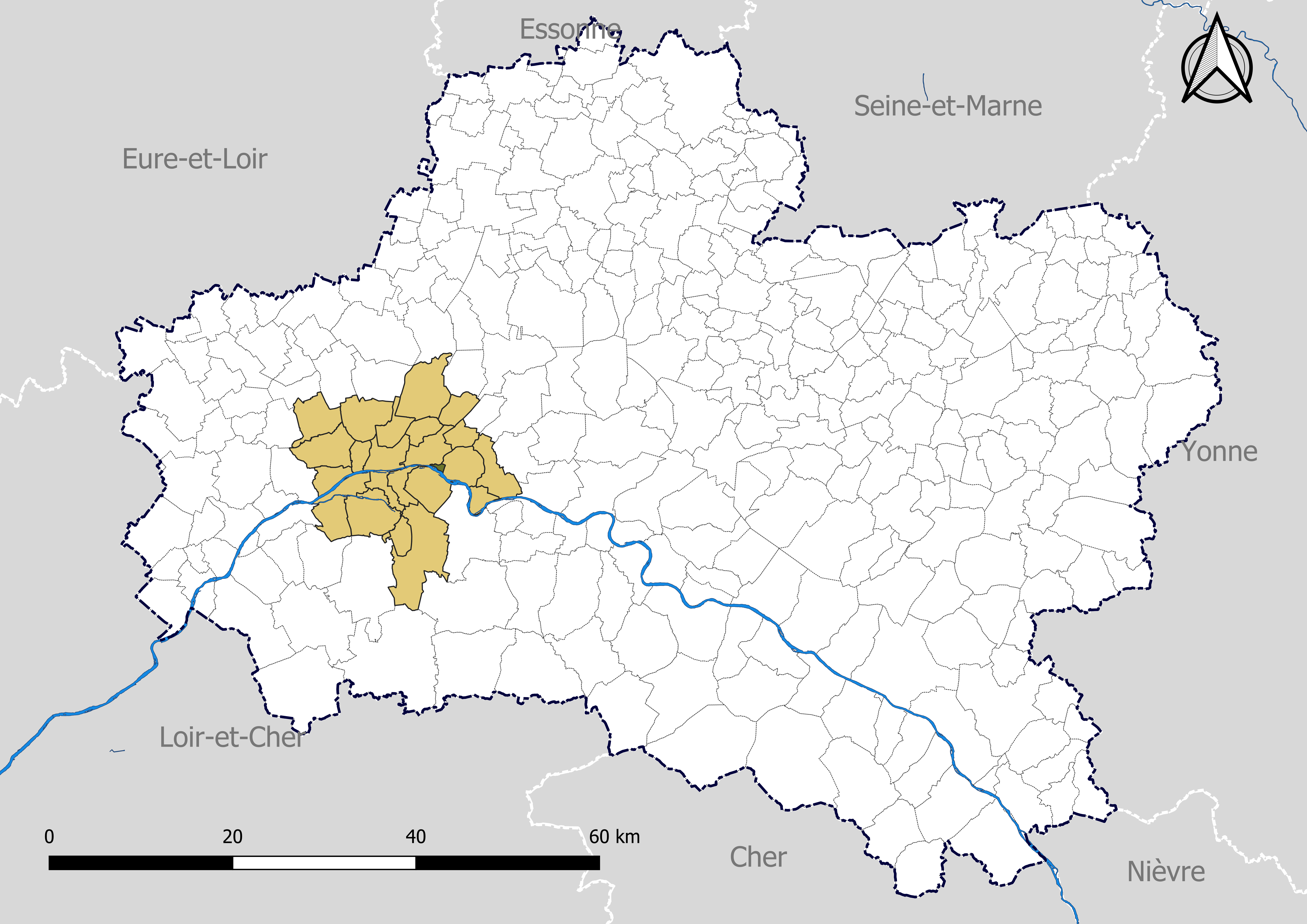
Combleux in Orléans Métropole in 2020.

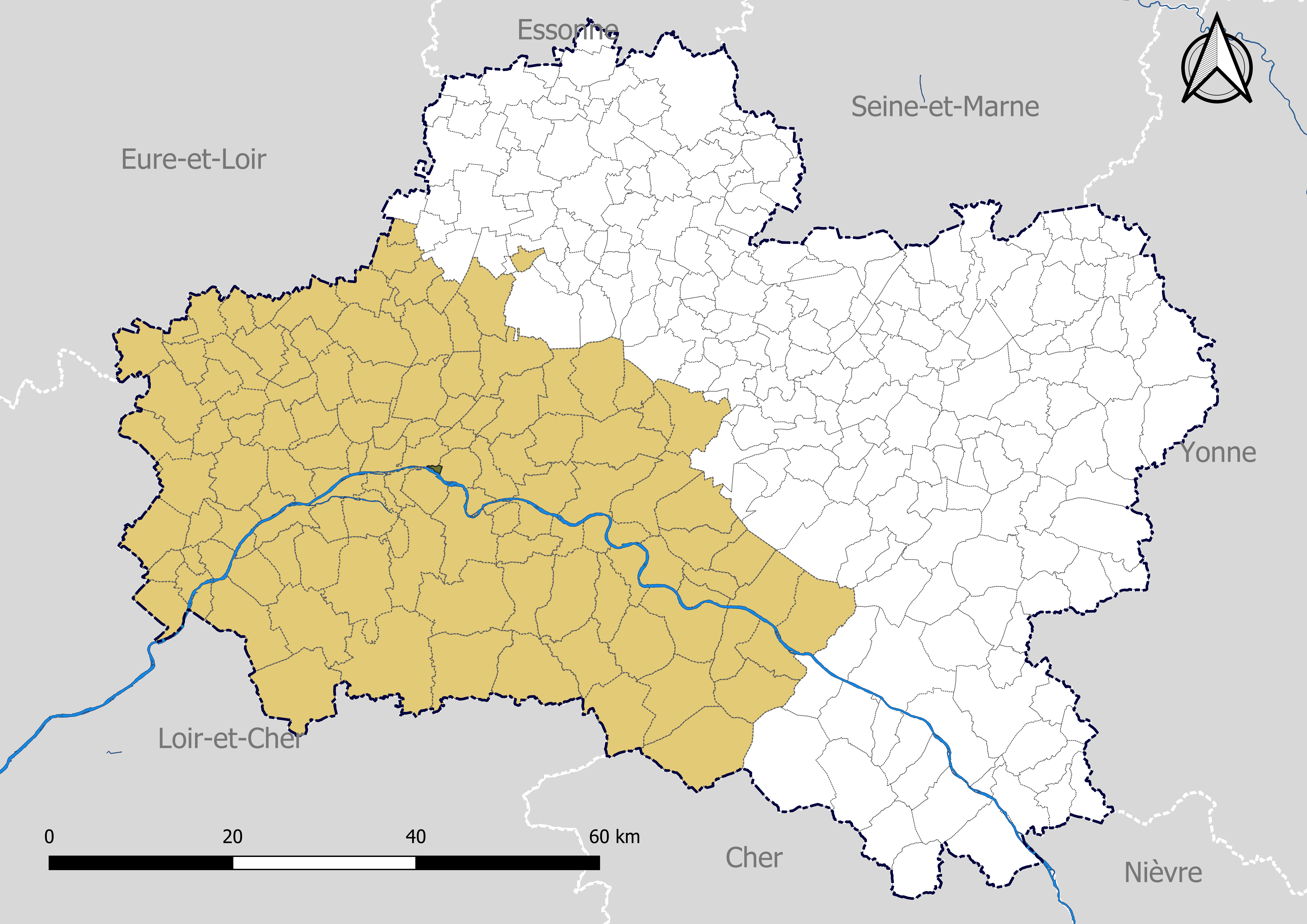
Combleux in the Arrondissement of Orléans in 2020.

=== Municipal politics and administration ===
==== Municipal council and mayor ====
Since the 2014 municipal elections, the municipal council of Combleux, a commune with fewer than 1,000 inhabitants, is elected through a multi-member majority voting system with two rounds, where voters can modify lists, mix candidates, or add or remove candidates without invalidating their vote, for a six-year renewable mandate. The council consists of 11 members. The municipal executive is led by the mayor, elected by the municipal council from among its members for a six-year term, corresponding to the council’s mandate. Francis Triquet has been mayor since 2020.

Period		Name	Qualifications
1995		Jacques Bié	
March 2014	May 2020	Frédéric Morlat	Category B civil servant
May 2020	Today	Francis Triquet	Former executive
Missing data to be completed.

== Facilities and public services ==
=== Water management ===
==== Drinking water ====
Until 1 January 2017, the production and distribution of drinking water in the commune were managed directly by the SIAEP (Note: SIAEP = Intermunicipal Syndicate for Drinking Water Supply.) Vals Loire Bionne & Cens. As water management is a mandatory responsibility of urban communities and metropolises, the urban community of Orléans Métropole took over the drinking water service from the commune when the Val de Loire agglomeration community transformed into an urban community on 1 January 2017, and then the métropole of Orléans Métropole assumed this responsibility on 1 May 2017.

==== Wastewater ====
A sanitation zoning plan, which delineates areas for collective sanitation, non-collective sanitation, and stormwater zoning, was developed by the AgglO and approved by a community council resolution on 15 April 2004. The commune is connected to the sewage treatment plant in La Chapelle-Saint-Mesmin. This facility, with a capacity of 350,000 PE, the largest in the Orléans Métropole territory, was commissioned on 1 June 1997.

=== Waste management ===
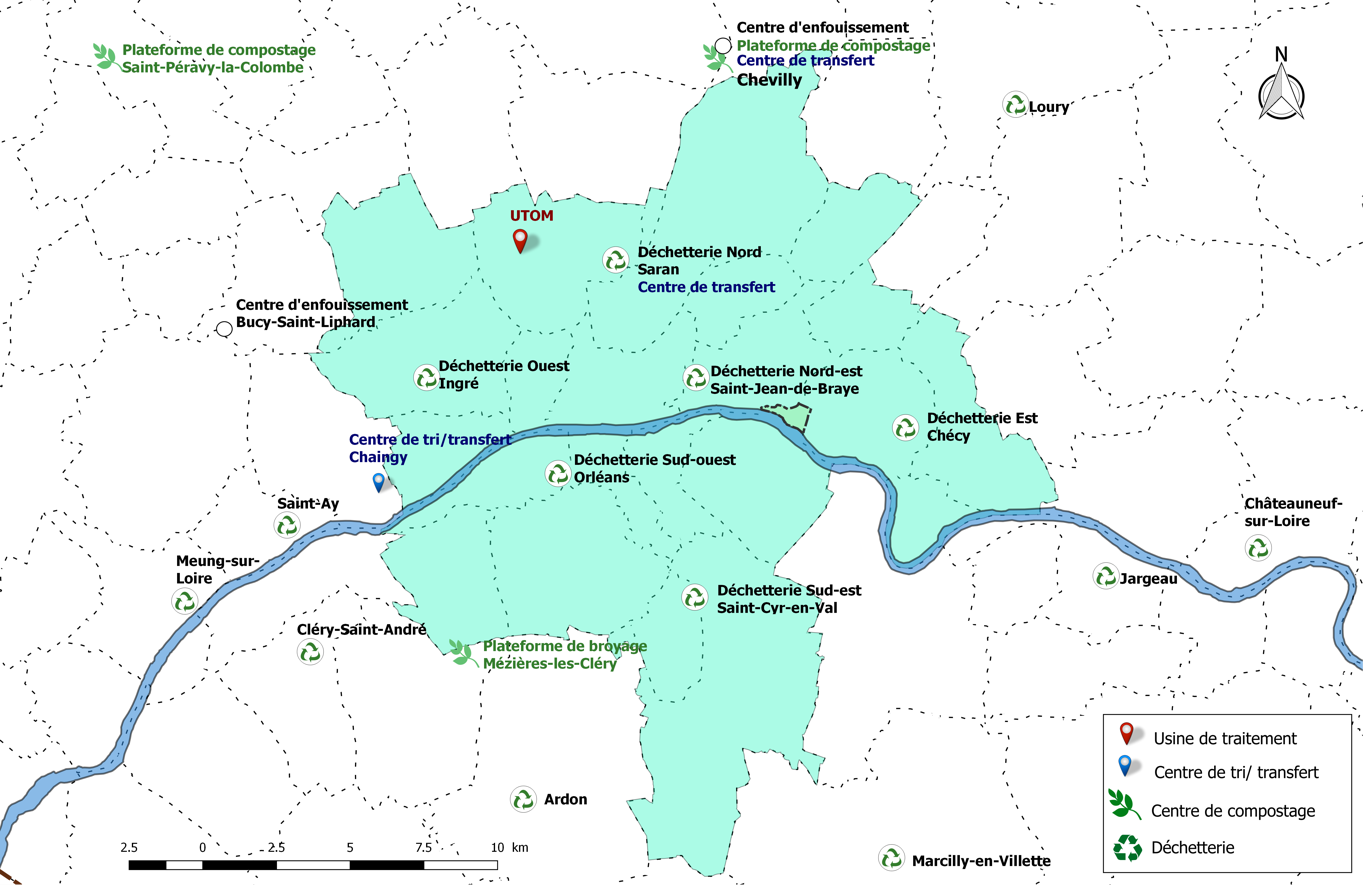
Waste collection, treatment, and recovery sites of the urban community of Orléans Métropole, with the location of the commune of Combleux.

Waste collection, treatment, and recovery is an exclusive responsibility of the urban community Orléans Métropole since 2000 (when the intercommunality was a community of communes). The collection of residual household waste (DMr) (Note: Residual household waste includes waste remaining after the extraction of other recyclable waste fractions.) is carried out door-to-door in all communes of the urban community. A network of six recycling centers accepts bulky items and other specific waste (green waste, hazardous waste, rubble, cardboard, etc.). The closest recycling centers for Combleux residents are the northeast recycling center in Saint-Jean-de-Braye and the east recycling center in Chécy.

A treatment facility enabling energy recovery (through incineration of residual household waste) and material recovery of other waste (hollow items, flat items, and multi-materials) has been in operation in the commune of Saran since 1996. It is operated by ORVADE, a subsidiary of the Veolia group.

== Demography ==
The evolution of the number of inhabitants is known through the population censuses carried out in the municipality since 1793. For municipalities with fewer than 10,000 inhabitants, a census survey covering the entire population is carried out every five years, with the reference populations for the intervening years being estimated by interpolation or extrapolation. For the municipality, the first comprehensive census under the new system was conducted in 2008.

In 2022, the municipality had 524 inhabitants, (Note: Municipal reference population in effect on 1 January 2025, dated 2022, defined within the territorial boundaries in effect on 1 January 2024, statistical reference date: 1 January 2022.) an increase of +3.97% compared to 2016 (Loiret: +1.89%, France excluding Mayotte: +2.11%).

Population evolution
1793	1800	1806	1821	1831	1836	1841	1846	1851
172	225	267	343	417	437	461	453	470

1856	1861	1866	1872	1876	1881	1886	1891	1896
435	387	365	373	283	260	255	250	231

1901	1906	1911	1921	1926	1931	1936	1946	1954
212	188	191	192	190	194	171	177	242

1962	1968	1975	1982	1990	1999	2006	2008	2013
300	283	371	352	383	424	452	460	482

2018	2022	-	-	-	-	-	-	-
493	524	-	-	-	-	-	-	-

== Local culture and heritage ==
=== Sites and monuments ===
- The Loire and its levee;
- The Saint-Symphorien church, containing bas-reliefs from the 17th and 18th centuries listed on the Monuments historiques inventory;
- Bief and locks of Combleux on the Orléans Canal: a 19th-century lock site known as Lock 2 bis of Combleux, including a lockkeeper’s house and a control house; the swing bridge of Combleux, crossing the Orléans Canal, built in 1913 by engineers Delées and Le Rond; the surface spillway on the Orléans Canal, mentioned as early as 1691 and rebuilt in the 19th century, allowing water from the canal to flow into the Loire and topped by a footbridge; the curved metal footbridge on the Orléans Canal from the early 20th century;
- The area between the Loire and the Orléans Canal consists of small, flower-decorated former boatmen’s houses, making it a favored walking spot. The lock marking the start of the canal remains permanently closed; A 19th-century boat carpenter’s workshop;
- The Hôtel de la Marine;
- The Chemin de la Patache, popular for walks along the Loire, its scenery, and sunsets, particularly appreciated by engaged couples for wedding photography in this picturesque setting;
- The beach, increasingly frequented but also subject to degradation.
Sites and monuments of Combleux.

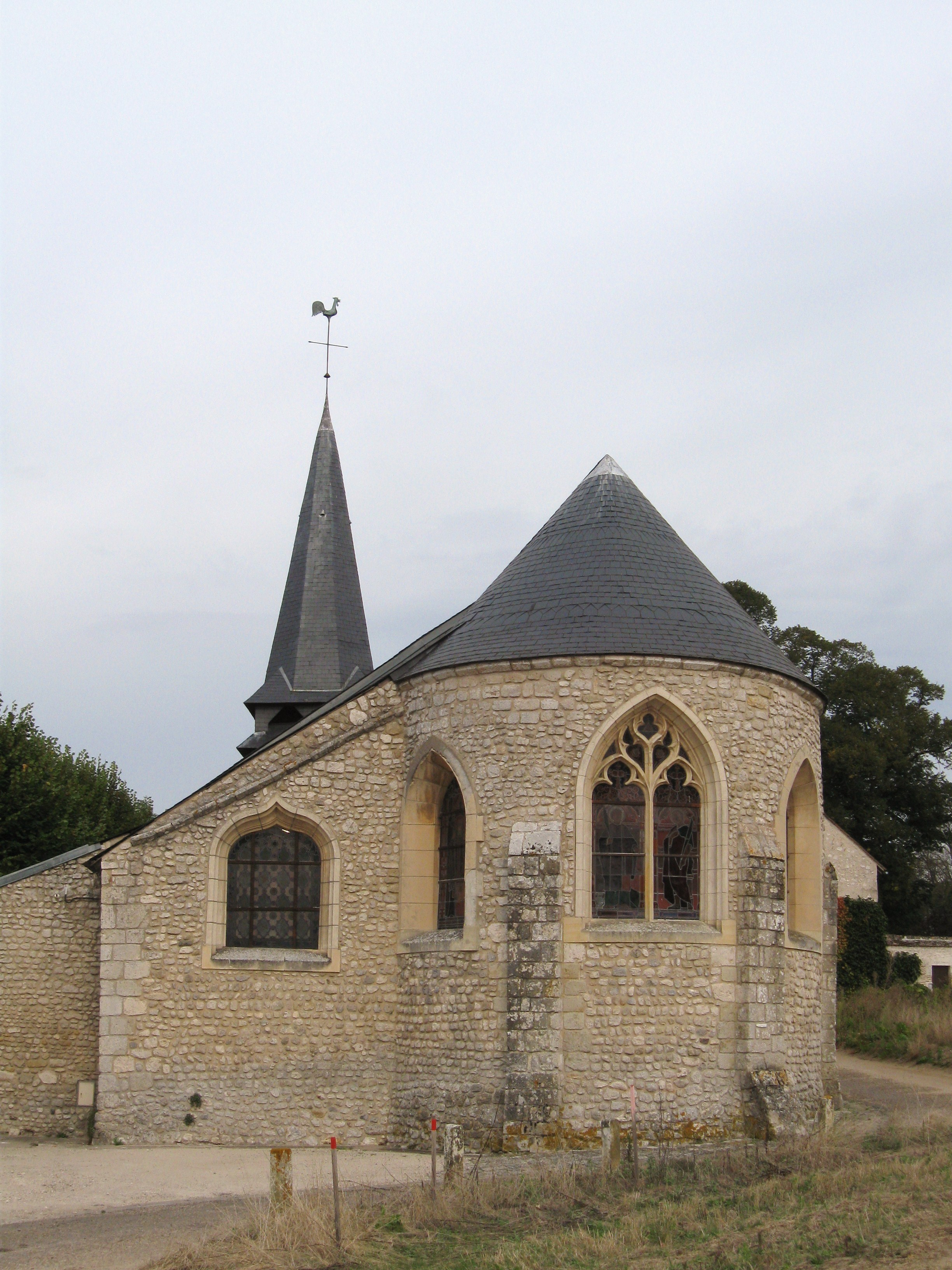
The Saint-Symphorien church.

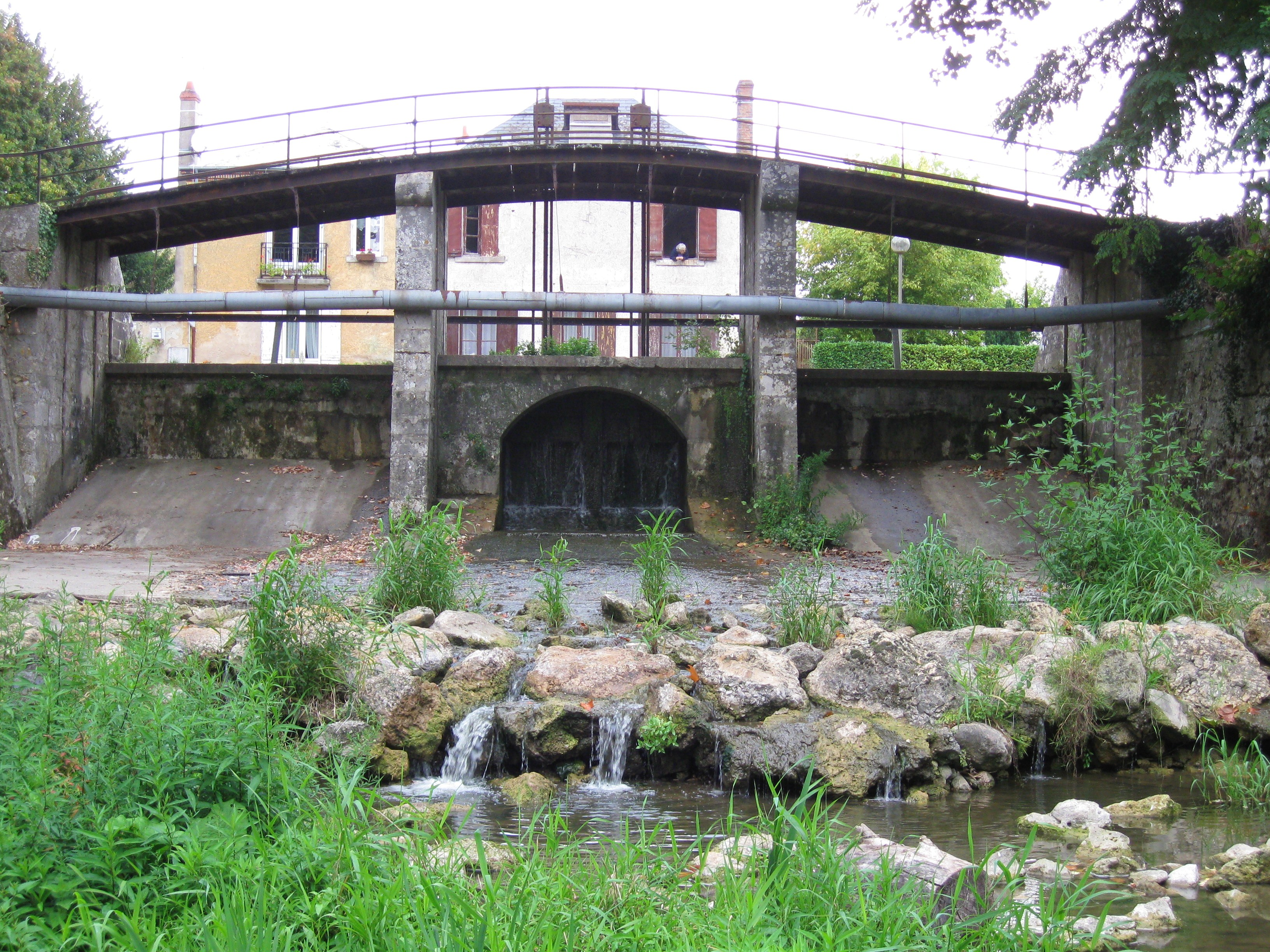
The spillway and its footbridge.

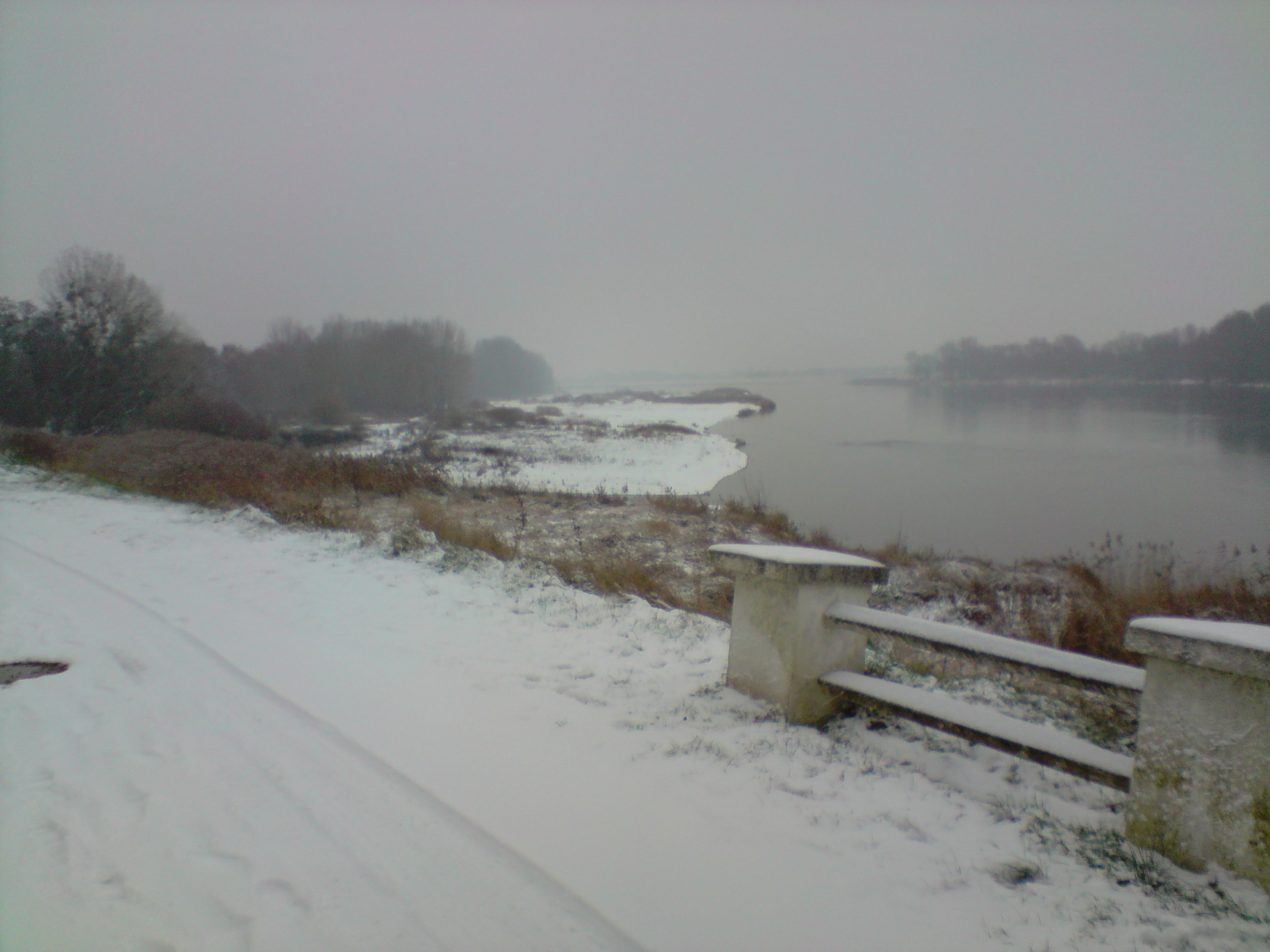
Combleux beach in snow.

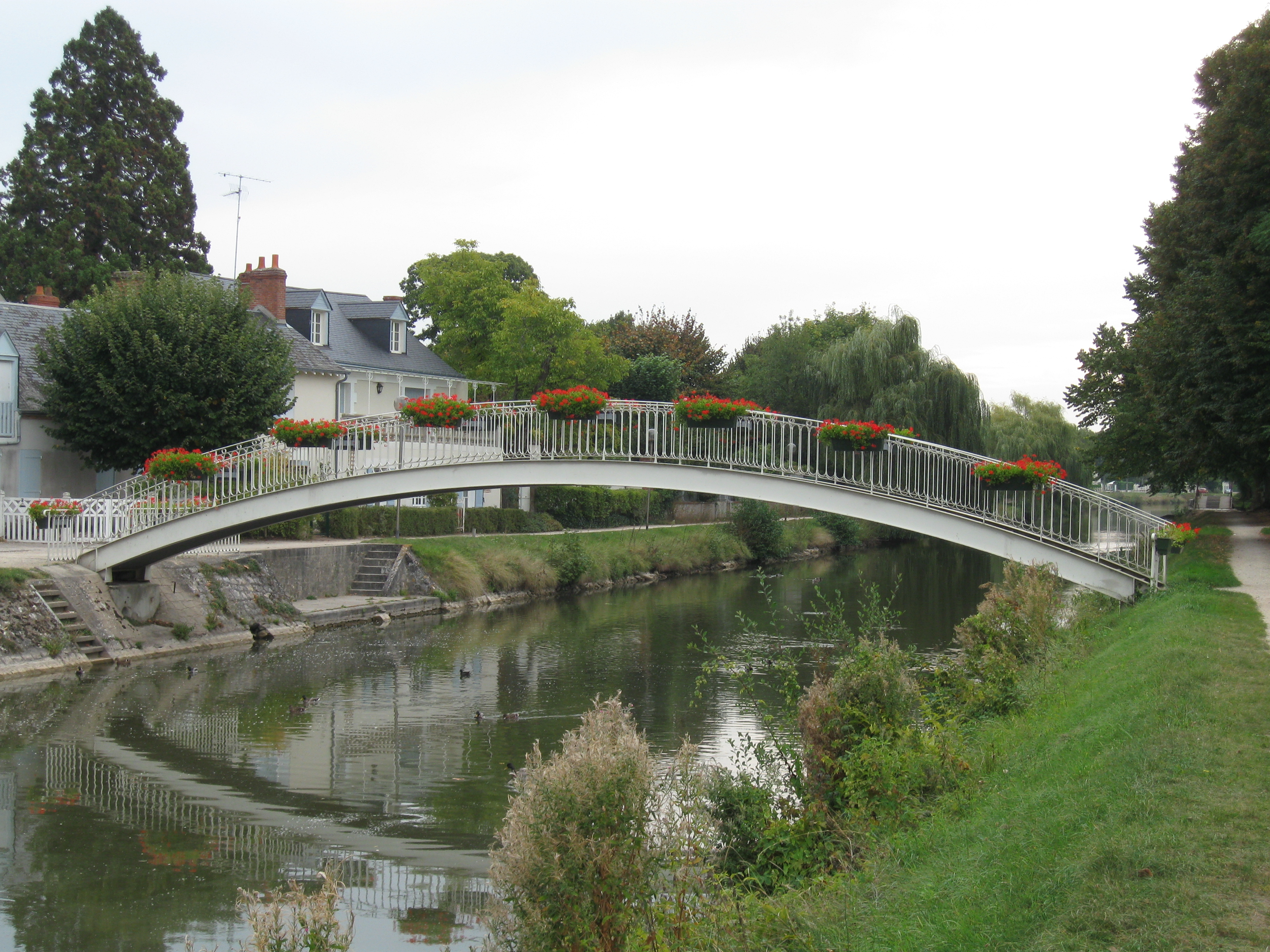
The curved metal footbridge.

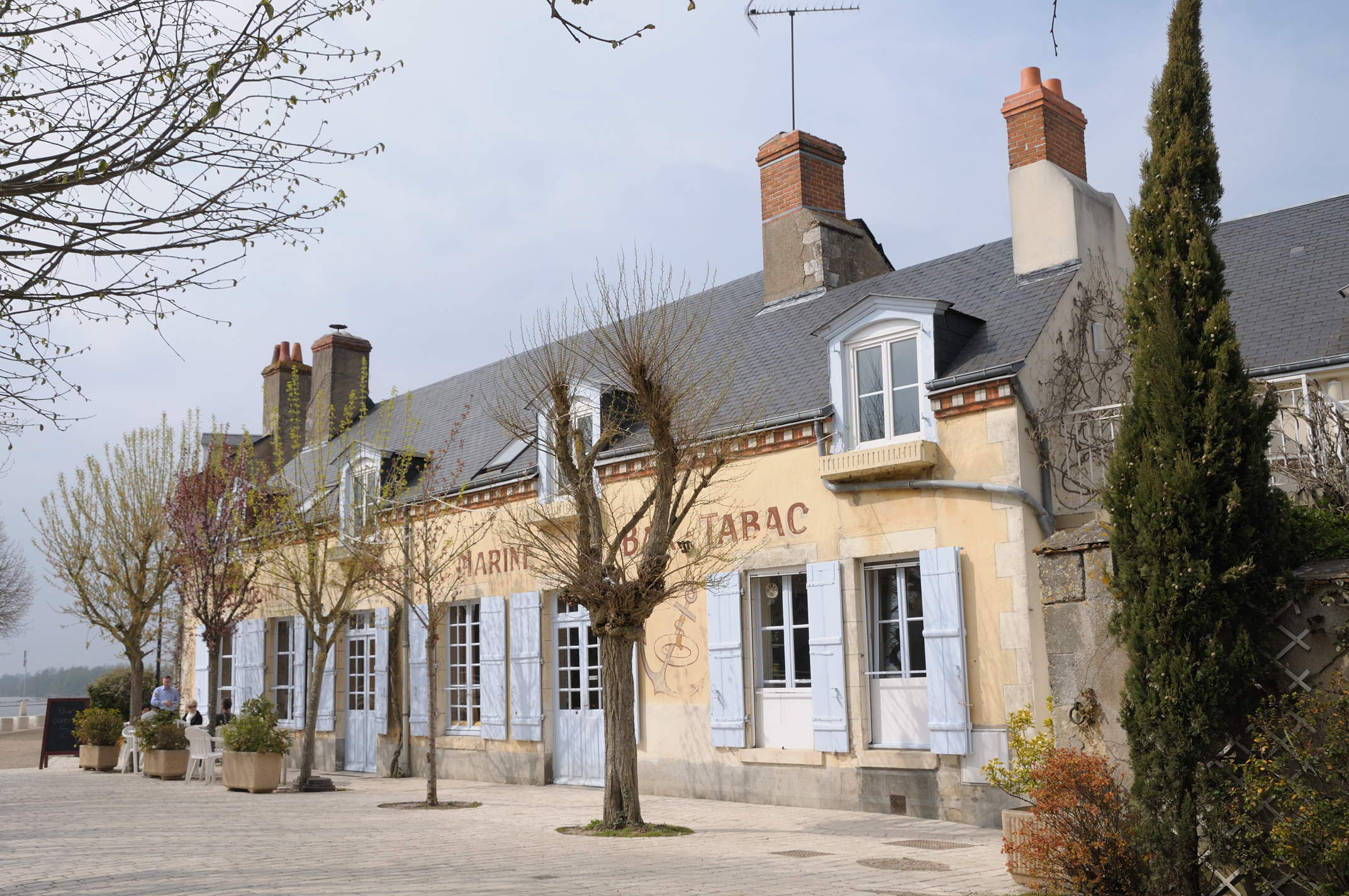
The Hôtel de la Marine.

=== Combleux in the arts ===
Combleux was one of the filming locations for the movie Father of My Children by Mia Hansen-Løve, selected in 2009 for the Un Certain Regard competition at the Cannes Film Festival.

The commune is mentioned by Pierre Michon in his book Les Onze.

Thierry Bouchard references the commune in the text "Du côté de Combleux" in his book Blue Birds' Corner.
