= Semoy =

Semoy may refer to:

- Semois, or Semoy, a river in Belgium and France
- Semoy, Loiret, France, a commune
