= Bou, Loiret =

Bou
- Commune
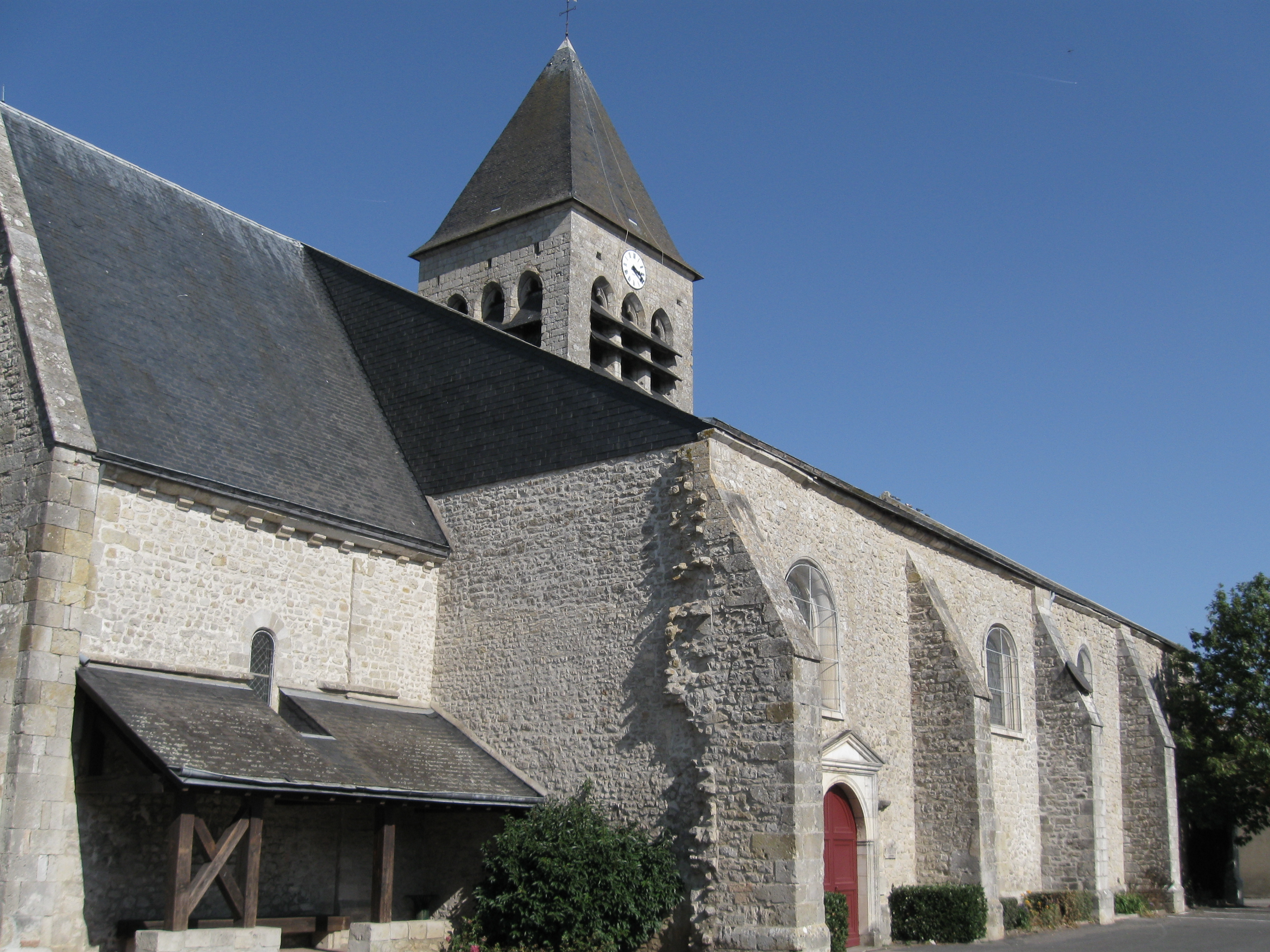
- Church of Saint George
- Location of Bou
- Location within France Location within Centre-Val de Loire
- Coordinates: 47°52′27″N 2°02′54″E
- Country: France
- Region: Centre-Val de Loire
- Department: Loiret
- Arrondissement: Orléans
- Canton: Saint-Jean-de-Braye
- Intercommunality: Orléans Métropole

Government
  - Mayor (2020–2026): Bruno Coeur
- Area^{1}: 6.29 km^{2} (2.43 sq mi)
- Highest elevation: 102 m (335 ft)
- Lowest elevation: 97 m (318 ft)
- Population (2023): 1,036
  - Density: 165/km^{2} (427/sq mi)
- Time zone: UTC+01:00 (CET)
  - Summer (DST): UTC+02:00 (CEST)
- INSEE/Postal code: 45043 /45430
- ^{1} French Land Register data, which excludes lakes, ponds, glaciers > 1 km^{2} (0.386 sq mi or 247 acres) and river estuaries.

Bou (French pronunciation: [bu]) is a commune in the French department of Loiret, north-central France. The village is situated in the greater Orléans area, in a meander of the river Loire, 14 km east of Orléans and 9 km west of the town of Jargeau. Bou is separated by fields from the villages of Mardié and Chécy, which lie to the north. The village of Bou was traditionally an agricultural area, producing cereal crops and vegetables and a local wine known as Gris-meunier.

== Population ==
Historical population
Year	Pop.	±% p.a.
1968	499	—
1975	567	+1.84%
1982	580	+0.32%
1990	705	+2.47%
1999	846	+2.05%
2007	906	+0.86%
2012	906	+0.00%
2017	958	+1.12%
2023	1,036	+1.31%
Source: INSEE

The inhabitants of Bou are known as Boumiens in French.

== See also ==
- Communes of the Loiret department
