= Canton of Saint-Jean-de-Braye =

Coordinates: 47.91°N 1.97°E

The canton of Saint-Jean-de-Braye is an administrative division of the Loiret department, in central France. Its borders were modified at the French canton reorganisation which came into effect in March 2015. Its seat is in Saint-Jean-de-Braye. The population of the canton as of 1 January 2018 is 39,328.

It consists of the following communes:

1. Boigny-sur-Bionne
2. Bou
3. Chécy
4. Combleux
5. Mardié
6. Saint-Jean-de-Braye
7. Semoy
