= Grand master (order) =

Head of a knighthood

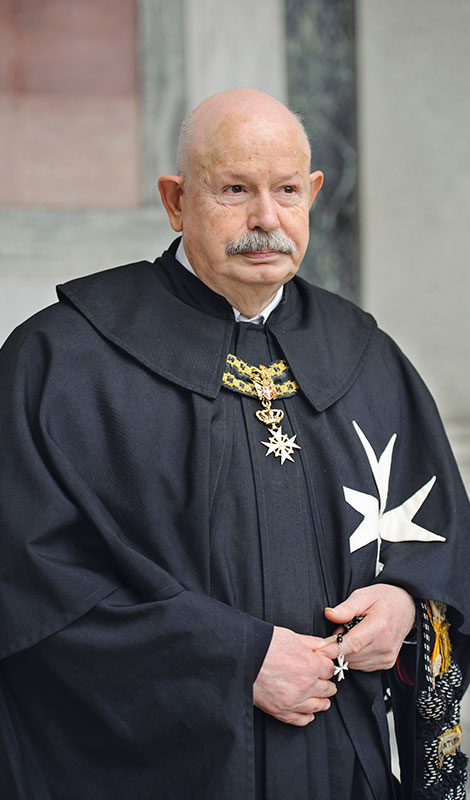
Fra' Giacomo dalla Torre del Tempio di Sanguinetto, 80th Grand Master of the Sovereign Military Order of Malta from 2018 to 2020

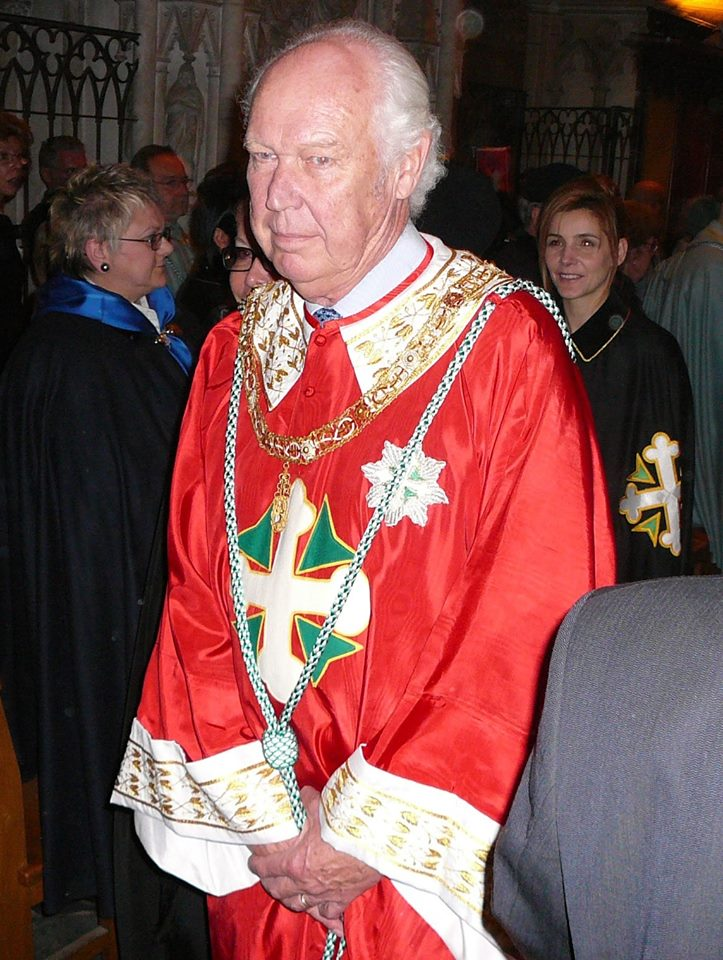
Vittorio Emanuele, Prince of Naples, as head of the House of Savoy was the grand master of the royal house's orders

Grand Master (Latin: Magister Magnus; German: Großmeister or German: Hochmeister (literally 'High Master'); French: Grand Maître; Spanish: Gran Maestre; Portuguese: Grão-Mestre; Swedish: Stormästare) is a title of the supreme head of various orders, including chivalric orders such as military orders and dynastic orders of knighthood.

The title also occurs in modern civil fraternal orders such as the Freemasons, the Odd Fellows, and various other fraternities. Additionally, numerous modern self-styled orders attempt to imitate habits of the former bodies.

== History ==
=== Medieval era ===
In medieval military orders such as the Knights Templar or the Livonian Brothers of the Sword, the Grand Master was the formal and executive head of a military and feudal hierarchy, which can be considered a "state within the state", especially in the crusader context sensu lato, notably aimed at the Holy Land or pagan territories in Eastern Europe, as well as the reconquista in the Iberian Peninsula.

If an order is granted statehood and thus widely considered sovereign, the Grand Master is also its Head of State.

=== Modern era ===
Besides the modern continuation of the organisations of medieval foundation, the title of Grand Master has been used by the heads of Grand Lodges of Freemasons since 1717, and by Odd Fellows since the 18th century.

The title of Grand Master is also used by various other fraternities, including academic ones associated with universities. The national leader of the Kappa Sigma fraternity goes by the title "Worthy Grand Master". The heads of local chapters use the title of "Grand Master".

== Orders of chivalry ==
A sovereign monarch often holds the title of Grand Master of the highest honorary dynastic orders of knighthood, or may confer or entrust it upon another person including a prince of the royal family, regularly the heir to the throne, who in other orders may hold another high rank/title.

The term "Sovereign" is generally used in place of "Grand Master" for the supreme head of various orders in Britain and other Commonwealth nations. In the Sovereign Military Order of Malta, the Grand Master is styled "Sovereign", e.g. Sovereign Grand Master, due to its status as an internationally independent sovereign entity.

In republican nations, a president may also serve as the grand master of the various state orders such as in France, where the president is the grand master of the Legion of Honour, and Portugal.

== Fraternal orders ==
=== Freemasonry ===
In Freemasonry, the Grand Master is an office given to a Freemason elected to oversee a Masonic jurisdiction.

== See also ==
- List of grand masters of the Knights Hospitaller
- Grand masters and lieutenancies of the Order of the Holy Sepulchre
- List of grand masters of the Knights Templar
- Grand Master of the Order of Saint Lazarus
- Grand Master of the Teutonic Knights
- Grand Master (Masonic)
