= Alstef =

French industrial automation company

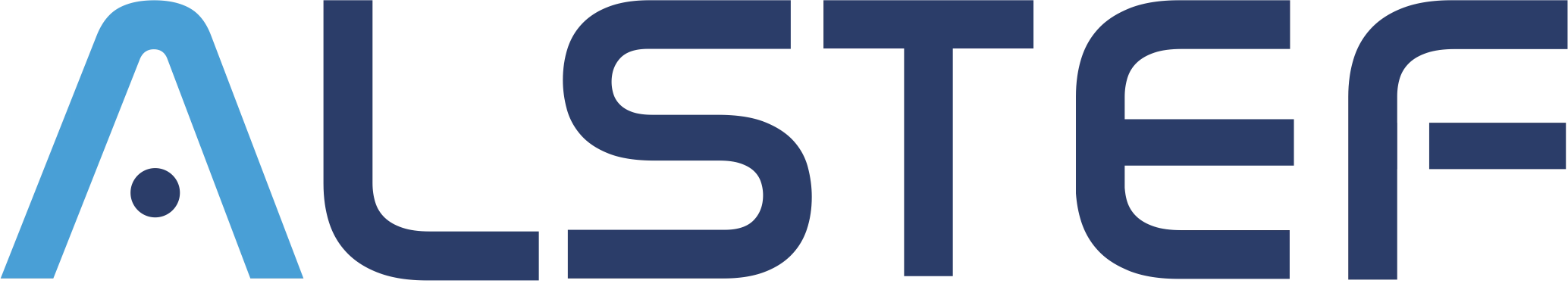
- Formerly: Alstef Automation (1961–2018)
- Type: Private
- Industry: Industrial automation Robotics
- Founded: 1961; 65 years ago in Boigny-sur-Bionne, France
- Founders: Pierre Marol; Jean-Luc Thomé
- Headquarters: Boigny-sur-Bionne, France
- Area served: Worldwide
- Key people: Pierre Marol (President); Nicolas Breton (CEO)
- Products: Baggage handling systems Automated guided vehicles Conveyor systems Cross-belt sorters
- Owner: Ardian (majority)
- Website: alstefgroup.com

Alstef is a French industrial automation and robotics company headquartered in Boigny-sur-Bionne, near Orléans, in the Centre-Val de Loire region of France.

== History ==
Alstef Automation was established in 1961 in Boigny-sur-Bionne, near Orléans, producing automated handling and storage systems. In 1965, it built the first automated stacker crane storage system in France, and in 1998 it delivered hold baggage screening system at Orly Airport. Alstef Automation was a subsidiary of the engineering group Alstom until 2000, when it was sold to a British investment fund; in 2006, Pierre Marol and the management team and employees acquired the company.

In March 2018, Alstef Automation and BA Robotic Systems Group, a French manufacturer of automated guided vehicles (AGVs) founded in 1975 as Bretagne Automatisme, merged to form a holding company called B2A Technology. The combined entity was supported by Future French Champions, a joint venture between CDC International Capital, Bpifrance and the Qatar Investment Authority, which took a 32% stake in the holding.

In November 2019, B2A Technology acquired Auckland-based airport baggage and parcel handling specialist Glidepath, which had been founded in 1972 by Ken Stevens. In September 2020, B2A Technology was renamed Alstef Group, and combined Alstef, BA Systèmes, BA Healthcare and Glidepath under a single name. In 2021, Alstef divested its medical robotics subsidiary BA Healthcare.

In April 2023, Alstef Group acquired Solution Net Systems (SNS), a Quakertown, Pennsylvania-based supplier of automated parcel handling systems, from the private equity firm Architect Equity. SNS, founded in 1971 as Accu-Sort Systems, had been carved out from Italian group Datalogic by Architect Equity in 2020. In June 2023, BA Systèmes was renamed as Alstef Mobile Robotics.

In June 2024, the French private investment firm Ardian entered negotiations to acquire a majority stake in Alstef Group through its Ardian Expansion V fund, alongside the management team and employee shareholders, with the founders Pierre Marol and Jean-Luc Thomé and Future French Champions reinvesting in the company. In September 2024, Alstef Group launched XSORT, a cross-belt sorter purpose-built for baggage handling.
