= Orléans Métropole =

Coordinates: 47°54′N 1°55′E

- Métropole
- Location within the Loiret department
- Country: France
- Region: Centre-Val de Loire
- Department: Loiret
- No. of communes: {{{nbcomm}}}
- Established: April 28, 2017

Government
  - President: Serge Grouard
- Area: 334.3 km^{2} (129.1 sq mi)
- Population (2019): 288,229
  - Density: 862.2/km^{2} (2,233/sq mi)
- Website: www.orleans-metropole.fr

Orléans Métropole (French pronunciation: [ɔʁleɑ̃ metʁɔpɔl]) is the métropole, an intercommunal structure, centred on the city of Orléans. It is located in the Loiret department, in the Centre-Val de Loire region, central France. It was created in April 2017, replacing the previous Communauté urbaine Orléans Métropole. Its area is 334.3 km^{2}. Its population was 288,229 in 2019, of which 116,269 in Orléans proper.

== Composition ==
The Orléans Métropole consists of the following 22 communes:

1. Boigny-sur-Bionne
2. Bou
3. Chanteau
4. La Chapelle-Saint-Mesmin
5. Chécy
6. Combleux
7. Fleury-les-Aubrais
8. Ingré
9. Mardié
10. Marigny-les-Usages
11. Olivet
12. Orléans
13. Ormes
14. Saint-Cyr-en-Val
15. Saint-Denis-en-Val
16. Saint-Hilaire-Saint-Mesmin
17. Saint-Jean-de-Braye
18. Saint-Jean-de-la-Ruelle
19. Saint-Jean-le-Blanc
20. Saint-Pryvé-Saint-Mesmin
21. Saran
22. Semoy
