= Living zone =

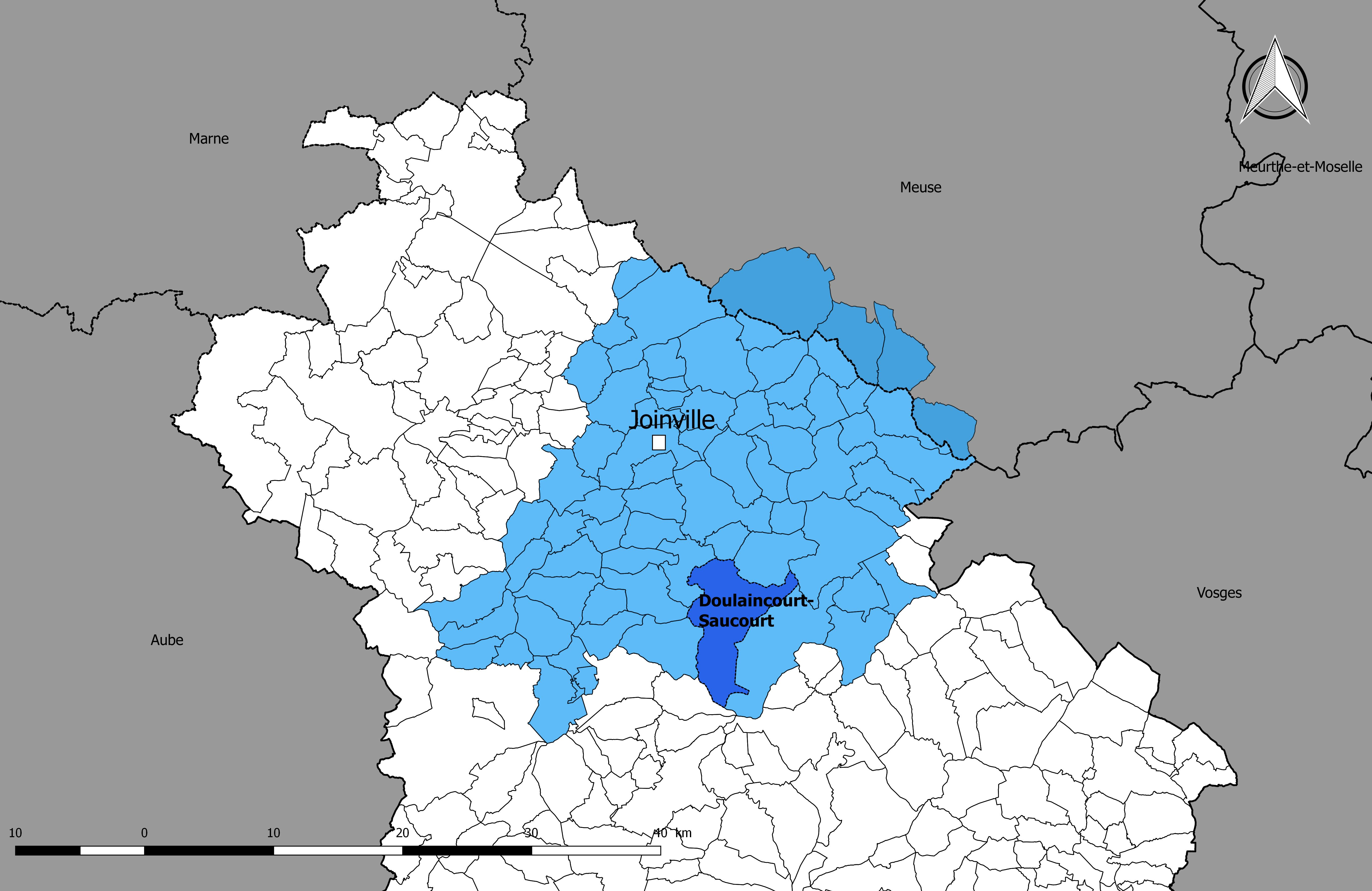
The living zone of the city of Joinville in north-eastern France, coloured in light blue.

A living zone (French: bassin de vie) is a human geographical and spatial planning concept and term used in France that designates the smallest territory where residents have access to the same range of common essential everyday services and facilities, such as personal services, commerce, education, health, sports, recreation, culture and transport. A living zone can alternatively be called a living area, a living basin, a life basin, a population catchment area, a pool of life, etc.

== Importance ==
Thinking of a territory in terms of a collection of living zones is valuable for planners seeking to promote social and economic development. It is grounded in the assumption that a robust geographical and social connectedness improves quality of life and leads to better decision-making at local levels. Parallel to the idea of commune (the smallest administrative division in France) as a fundamental unit of direct democracy, the idea of a living zone, regardless of its size, represents a sense of attachment or belonging and a perceived capacity to influence local decisions and outcomes. According to the Interministerial Delegation for Territorial Development and Regional Attractiveness (DATAR) in France, a living zone exhibits "geographical, social, cultural, and economic coherence, expressing homogeneous needs in terms of activities and services."

== Types of living zones ==
In France, the latest zoning of living zones as of 2022 performed by the country's National Institute of Statistics and Economic Studies (Insee) has identified a total of 1,707 living zones (including 26 in the overseas departments) structuring the national territory of France. Among these, 1,256 are situated in rural areas (i.e. rural living zones), which contain nearly a third of the country's population. Insee has grouped living zones into three categories: Dense Urban (with an average population of around 461 thousand), Urban of Intermediate Density (with an average population of around 44 thousand) and Rural (with an average population of around 16 thousand), itself divided into Peri-urban Rural and Non peri-urban Rural living zones.

== Ranges of facilities and remote population ==
Insee has also categorized the essential services and facilities into three ranges: Proximity range (28 services and facilities including the post office, convenience store, bakery, butcher's shop, primary school, general practitioner (doctor), drugstore, taxi stand, etc.); Intermediate range (35 services and facilities including the police, bank, supermarket, bookstore, middle school, medical laboratory, ambulance, swimming pool, etc.); and Superior range (47 services and facilities including employment office, hypermarket, high school, emergency ward, maternity ward, specialist doctors, movie theater, etc.). Residents are considered remote (population éloignée) when their average access-time for these ranges go beyond 6 minutes, 12 minutes and 21 minutes by car, respectively. In France, an overall 10% of the population are considered remote by this standard, although the remoteness is much more pronounced in the non peri-urban rural living zones, where a percentage equal to or greater than 28% of the population are considered remote depending on the range of facilities.

== See also ==
- 15-minute city, urban planning concept where most daily necessities and services can be easily reached by a 15-minute walk or ride.
- Functional urban area (Aire d'influence des villes in French), a city and its surrounding commuting zone, representing the area's economic and functional extent based on daily population movement.
- Labor market area (Bassin d'emploi or zone d'emploi in French), region within which residents can find or change jobs within a reasonable commuting distance from their place of residence.
