= Saint-Denis-en-Val =

- Commune
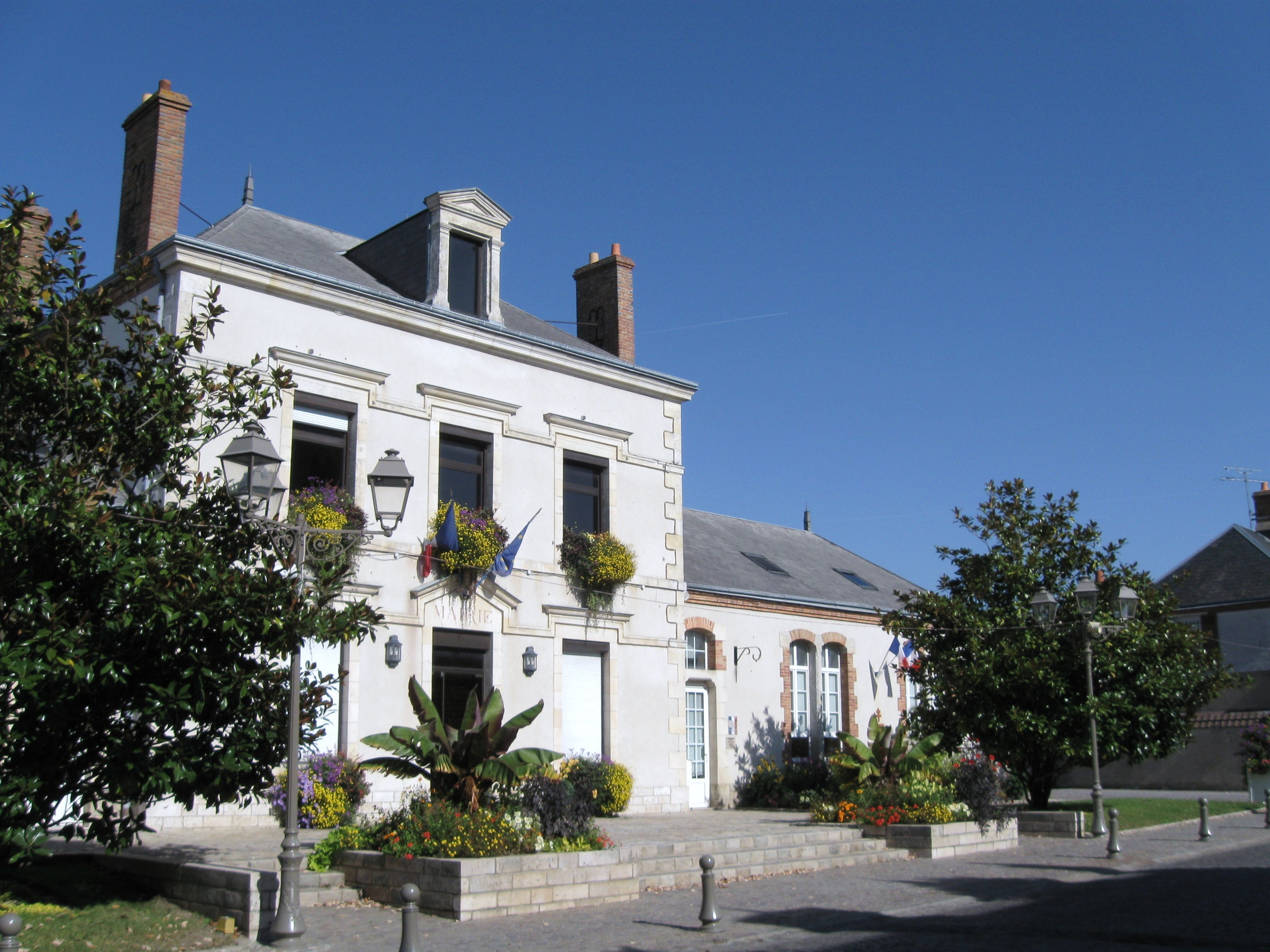
- Town hall

- Coat of arms
- Location of Saint-Denis-en-Val
- Location within France Location within Centre-Val de Loire
- Coordinates: 47°52′41″N 1°57′39″E
- Country: France
- Region: Centre-Val de Loire
- Department: Loiret
- Arrondissement: Orléans
- Canton: Saint-Jean-le-Blanc
- Intercommunality: Orléans Métropole

Government
  - Mayor (2020–2026): Marie-Philippe Lubet
- Area^{1}: 17.11 km^{2} (6.61 sq mi)
- Elevation: 116 m (381 ft)
- Highest elevation: 99 m (325 ft)
- Lowest elevation: 93 m (305 ft)
- Population (2023): 7,766
  - Density: 453.9/km^{2} (1,176/sq mi)
- Time zone: UTC+01:00 (CET)
  - Summer (DST): UTC+02:00 (CEST)
- INSEE/Postal code: 45274 /45560
- ^{1} French Land Register data, which excludes lakes, ponds, glaciers > 1 km^{2} (0.386 sq mi or 247 acres) and river estuaries.

Saint-Denis-en-Val (French pronunciation: [sɛ̃ dəni ɑ̃ val]) is a commune in the Loiret department in north-central France.

== Population ==
Historical population
Year	Pop.	±% p.a.
1968	2,107	—
1975	3,480	+7.43%
1982	4,403	+3.42%
1990	6,598	+5.19%
1999	7,206	+0.98%
2007	7,184	−0.04%
2012	7,149	−0.10%
2017	7,517	+1.01%
2023	7,766	+0.54%
Source: INSEE

== See also ==
- Communes of the Loiret department
