= Boigny-sur-Bionne =

- Commune
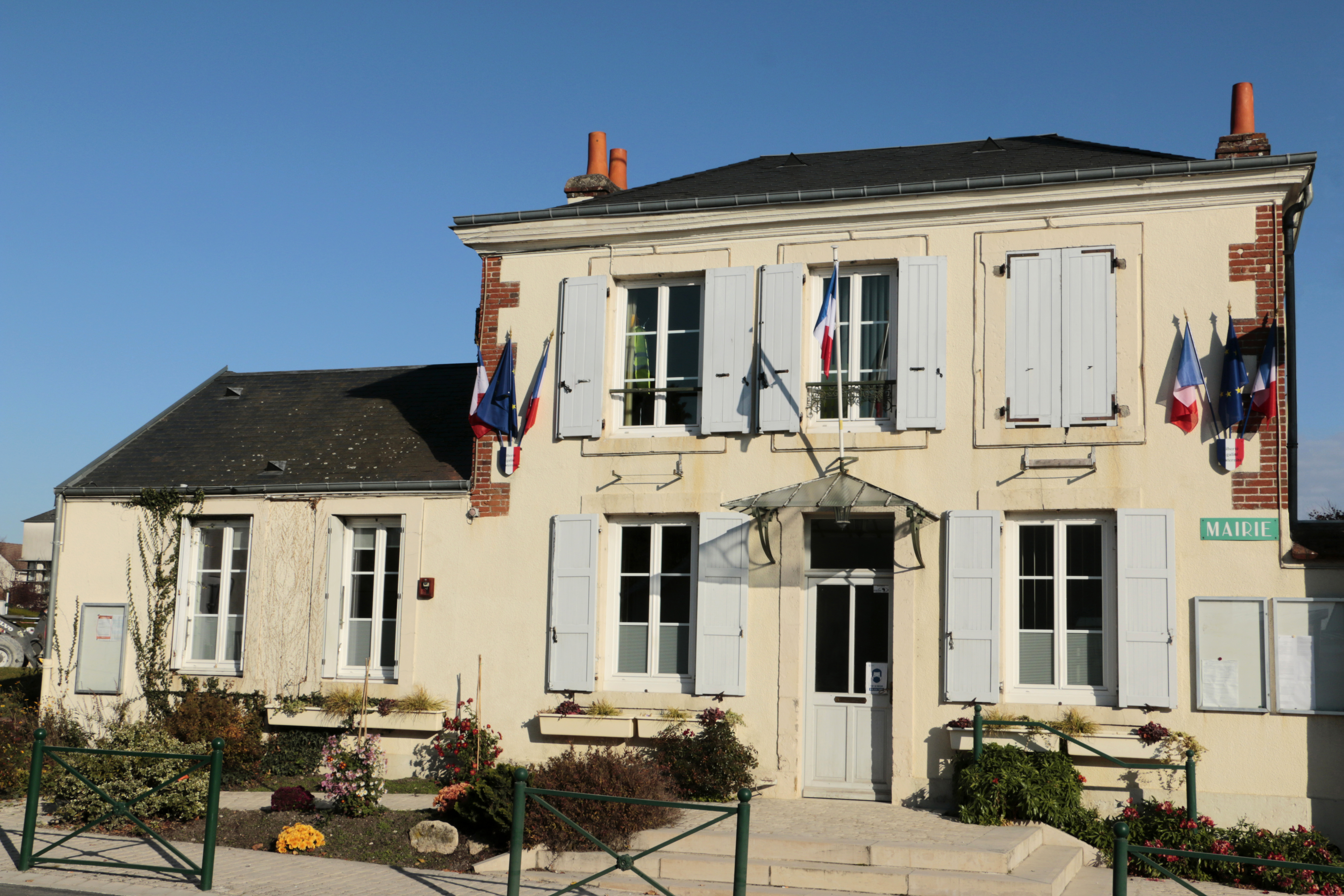
- Town hall
- Location of Boigny-sur-Bionne
- Location within France Location within Centre-Val de Loire
- Coordinates: 47°55′42″N 2°00′36″E
- Country: France
- Region: Centre-Val de Loire
- Department: Loiret
- Arrondissement: Orléans
- Canton: Saint-Jean-de-Braye
- Intercommunality: Orléans Métropole

Government
  - Mayor (2020–2026): Luc Milliat
- Area^{1}: 7.53 km^{2} (2.91 sq mi)
- Highest elevation: 121 m (397 ft)
- Lowest elevation: 98 m (322 ft)
- Population (2023): 2,194
  - Density: 291/km^{2} (755/sq mi)
- Time zone: UTC+01:00 (CET)
  - Summer (DST): UTC+02:00 (CEST)
- INSEE/Postal code: 45034 /45760
- ^{1} French Land Register data, which excludes lakes, ponds, glaciers > 1 km^{2} (0.386 sq mi or 247 acres) and river estuaries.

Boigny-sur-Bionne (French pronunciation: [bwaɲi syʁ bjɔn]) is a commune in the Loiret department, in the Centre-Val de Loire region, in north-central France.

== Population ==
Historical population

Year	Pop.	±% p.a.
1793	226	—
1821	218	−0.13%
1846	352	+1.94%
1872	333	−0.21%
1901	298	−0.38%
1926	230	−1.03%
1946	212	−0.41%
1962	238	+0.73%
1968	276	+2.50%

Year	Pop.	±% p.a.
1975	1,596	+28.49%
1982	1,516	−0.73%
1990	1,619	+0.83%
1999	1,890	+1.73%
2007	2,117	+1.43%
2012	2,178	+0.57%
2017	2,128	−0.46%
2023	2,194	+0.51%

Source: EHESS and INSEE (1968-2023)

== Economy ==
Economy of Boigny grew in the 1970s with the establishment of an IBM plant in the north of the town, which later became Lexmark.

In 2000, the former Lexmark plant, Les Trois Arches, became Amazon's first French warehouse. In 2007, Amazon moved to a larger and new location in Saran, also in Orléans Métropole.

Several large companies are located in Boigny-sur-Bionne:

- Alstef (airport equipment)
- Parfums Christian Dior (cosmetics)
- GXO Logistics
- IBM
- Intelcia (call center)
- Jardibric (gardening equipment) (French headquarters)
- Konecranes (cranes and lifting equipment) (French headquarters)
- Lemken (agricultural equipment) (French headquarters)
- National Forests Office (ONF) (Central-West-Aquitaine territorial direction)
- L’Oréal (cosmetics)
- Renault Retail Group, a subsidiary of Renault (distribution of motor vehicles)
- Bureau Veritas (regional headquarters)
- WashTec (car wash equipment) (French headquarters).

The traditional vinegar maker Martin Pouret moved from Fleury-les-Aubrais to Boigny-sur-Bionne in August 2024.

Boigny-sur-Bionne is also home to a dozen of small and medium-sized businesses, such as Noblinox, and to about twenty artisans and traders.

== See also ==
- Communes of the Loiret department
