= Semoy, Loiret =

Semoy
- Commune
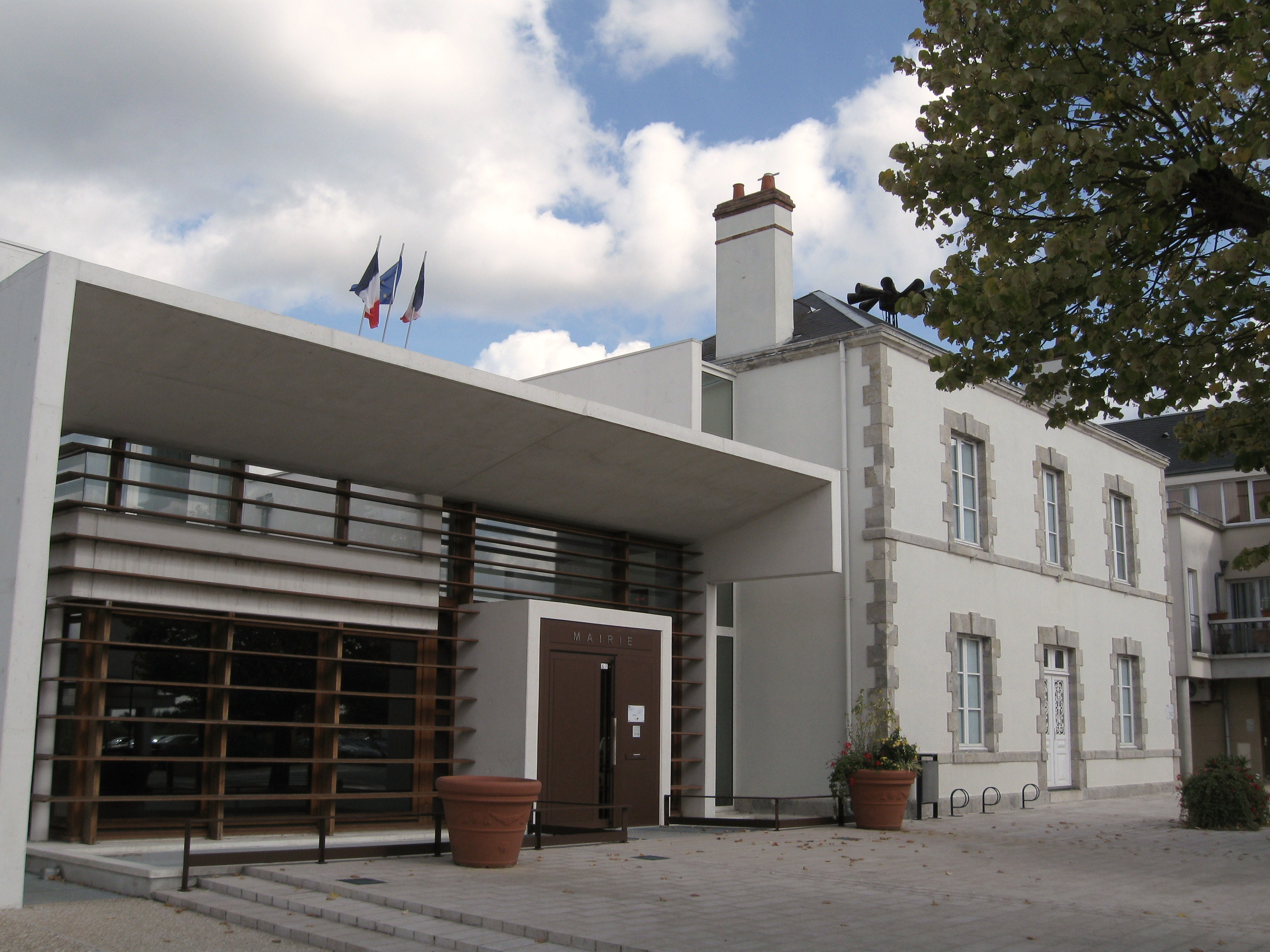
- The town hall in Semoy

- Coat of arms
- Location of Semoy
- Location within France Location within Centre-Val de Loire
- Coordinates: 47°55′56″N 1°57′02″E
- Country: France
- Region: Centre-Val de Loire
- Department: Loiret
- Arrondissement: Orléans
- Canton: Saint-Jean-de-Braye
- Intercommunality: Orléans Métropole

Government
  - Mayor (2020–2026): Laurent Baude
- Area^{1}: 7.78 km^{2} (3.00 sq mi)
- Elevation: 122 m (400 ft)
- Highest elevation: 134 m (440 ft)
- Lowest elevation: 108 m (354 ft)
- Population (2023): 3,269
  - Density: 420/km^{2} (1,090/sq mi)
- Demonym: Semeyen
- Time zone: UTC+01:00 (CET)
  - Summer (DST): UTC+02:00 (CEST)
- INSEE/Postal code: 45308 /45400
- Website: www.ville-semoy.fr
- ^{1} French Land Register data, which excludes lakes, ponds, glaciers > 1 km^{2} (0.386 sq mi or 247 acres) and river estuaries.

Semoy (French pronunciation: [səmwa]) is a commune in the Loiret department in north-central France.

== Population ==
Historical population
Year	Pop.	±% p.a.
1968	1,567	—
1975	1,792	+1.94%
1982	1,395	−3.51%
1990	2,237	+6.08%
1999	2,879	+2.84%
2007	2,926	+0.20%
2012	3,245	+2.09%
2017	3,176	−0.43%
2023	3,269	+0.48%
Source: INSEE

== See also ==
- Communes of the Loiret department
