= Chécy =

- Commune
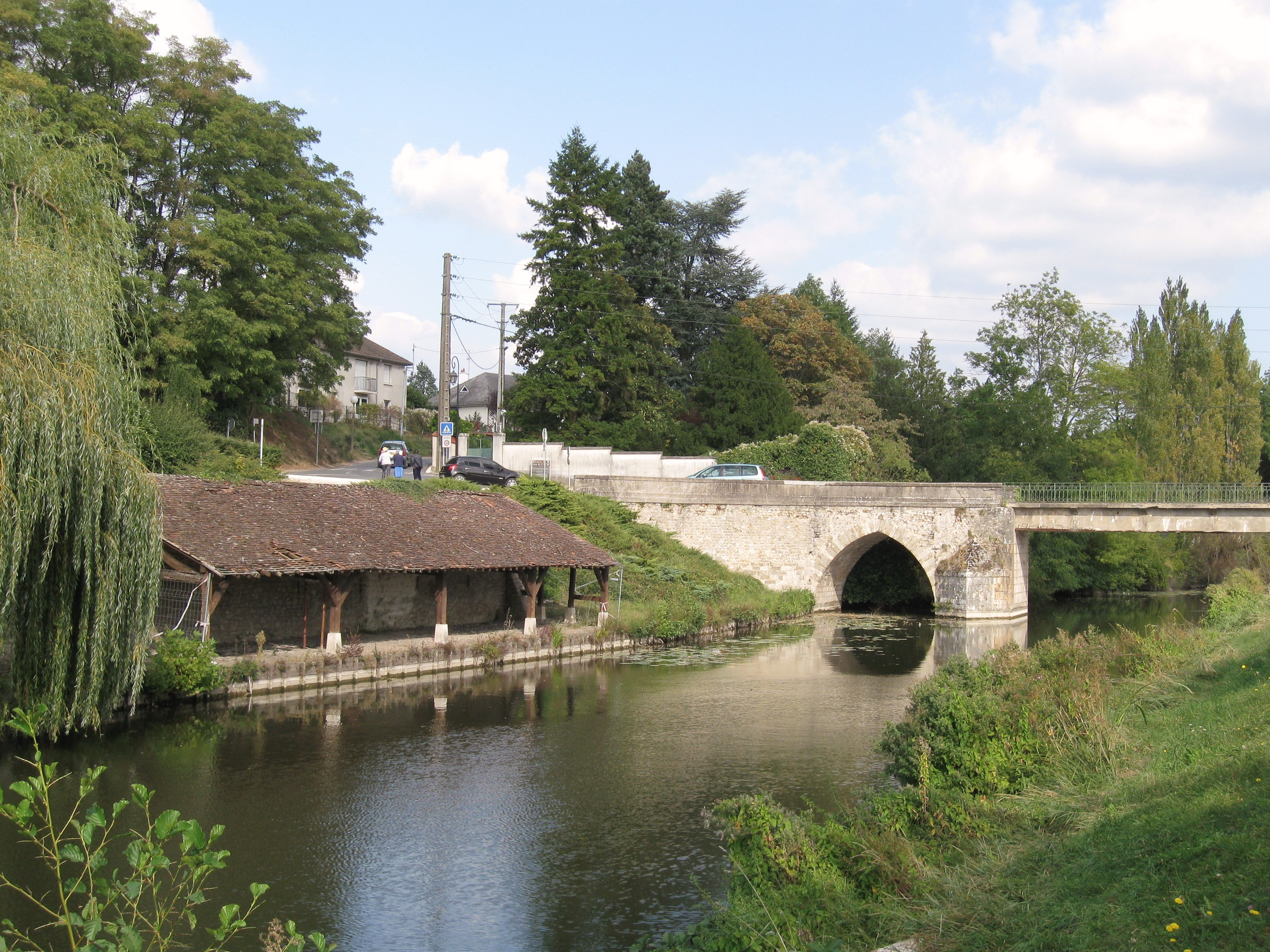
- The Orléans Canal at Chécy

- Coat of arms
- Location of Chécy
- Location within France Location within Centre-Val de Loire
- Coordinates: 47°53′39″N 2°01′39″E
- Country: France
- Region: Centre-Val de Loire
- Department: Loiret
- Arrondissement: Orléans
- Canton: Saint-Jean-de-Braye
- Intercommunality: Orléans Métropole

Government
  - Mayor (2020–2026): Jean-Vincent Vallies
- Area^{1}: 15.47 km^{2} (5.97 sq mi)
- Highest elevation: 116 m (381 ft)
- Lowest elevation: 95 m (312 ft)
- Population (2023): 9,083
  - Density: 587.1/km^{2} (1,521/sq mi)
- Demonym(s): Cacien, Cacienne
- Time zone: UTC+01:00 (CET)
  - Summer (DST): UTC+02:00 (CEST)
- INSEE/Postal code: 45089 /45430
- Website: www.checy.fr
- ^{1} French Land Register data, which excludes lakes, ponds, glaciers > 1 km^{2} (0.386 sq mi or 247 acres) and river estuaries.

Chécy (French pronunciation: [ʃesi]) is a commune in the department of Loiret, Centre-Val de Loire, France.

== Population ==
Historical population
Year	Pop.	±% p.a.
1968	2,283	—
1975	3,986	+8.29%
1982	6,299	+6.76%
1990	7,177	+1.64%
1999	7,221	+0.07%
2007	7,953	+1.21%
2012	8,585	+1.54%
2017	8,667	+0.19%
2023	9,083	+0.78%
Source: INSEE

== See also ==
- Communes of the Loiret department
