= Mardié =

- Commune
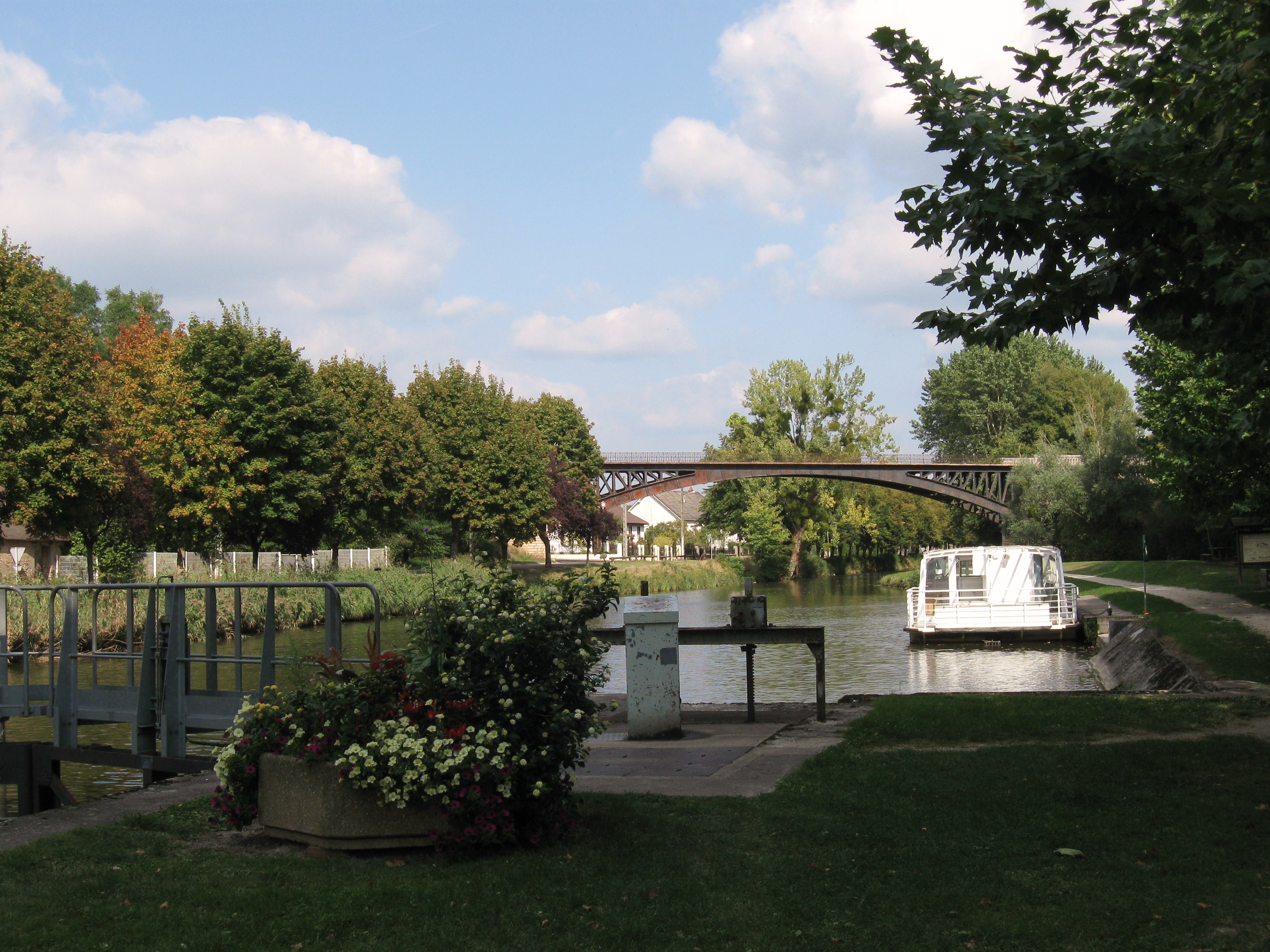
- The Orleans Canal in Mardié

- Coat of arms
- Location of Mardié
- Location within France Location within Centre-Val de Loire
- Coordinates: 47°53′16″N 2°03′27″E
- Country: France
- Region: Centre-Val de Loire
- Department: Loiret
- Arrondissement: Orléans
- Canton: Saint-Jean-de-Braye
- Intercommunality: Orléans Métropole

Government
  - Mayor (2020–2026): Clémentine Cailleteau-Crucy
- Area^{1}: 17.28 km^{2} (6.67 sq mi)
- Highest elevation: 124 m (407 ft)
- Lowest elevation: 97 m (318 ft)
- Population (2023): 3,078
  - Density: 178.1/km^{2} (461.3/sq mi)
- Demonym: Mardésiens
- Time zone: UTC+01:00 (CET)
  - Summer (DST): UTC+02:00 (CEST)
- INSEE/Postal code: 45194 /45430
- ^{1} French Land Register data, which excludes lakes, ponds, glaciers > 1 km^{2} (0.386 sq mi or 247 acres) and river estuaries.

Mardié (French pronunciation: [maʁdje]) is a commune in the Loiret department in north-central France.

== Population ==
Historical population
Year	Pop.	±% p.a.
1968	1,062	—
1975	1,276	+2.66%
1982	1,791	+4.96%
1990	2,070	+1.83%
1999	2,370	+1.52%
2007	2,592	+1.13%
2012	2,529	−0.49%
2017	2,816	+2.17%
2023	3,078	+1.49%
Source: INSEE

== See also ==
- Communes of the Loiret department
