= Franz Schrader =

French painter

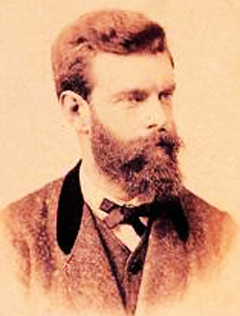
Franz Schrader ≈ 1875

Jean Daniel François Schrader (January 11, 1844 – October 18, 1924), better known as Franz Schrader, was a French mountaineer, geographer, cartographer and landscape painter, born in Bordeaux. He made an important contribution to the mapping of the Pyrenees and was highly considered among the pyreneists.

== Biography ==
The son of Prussian Ferdinand Schrader from Magdeburg, who emigrated to Bordeaux, and of Marie-Louise Ducos, Schrader was from a family of Nérac and the cousin of geographers Élisée and Onésime Reclus. He showed a talent for drawing from an early age. But his strict father, denying him the opportunity of higher education, placed him as a pen pusher at a tax gatherer. Franz then found another job in a trading house run by one of his father's friends, a situation where he could devote more time to broadening his literary and scientific knowledge.

In 1866, while staying with his friend Léonce Lourde-Rocheblave in Pau, he had a sort of revelation at the spectacle grandiose de la barrière montagneuse of the Pyrenees. His vocation strengthened when reading stories by Ramond de Carbonnières (1755–1827) (Les Voyages au Mont-Perdu – Travels to Monte Perdido) and by Henry Russell (1834–1909) (Les Grandes Ascensions des Pyrénées, guide d'une mer à l'autre – Great ascents of the Pyrenees, a guide from one sea to the other). While devoting the main part of his leisure to long hikes in the mountains, during which he gathered thousands of observations for his topographical records, he still found time to paint numerous panoramas of the Pyrenees as well as the Alps which he also studied, and to acquire a solid formation in topography.

While Schrader scoured the Pyrenees with his friend Lourde-Rocheblave, he also acquired a strong background in cartography with the aim of applying it to a large scale map of the nearby Pyrenees. To facilitate topographical work in rugged terrain, he developed the orograph in 1873. His first great cartographic work, in 1874, was the map of the massif of Gavarnie-Mont-Perdu at a scale of 1:40 000, for which he collected the measurements with the participation of Lourde-Rocheblave from nearby Pau. That map triggered such a sensation that it was included in the annual Mémoires of the Société des Sciences Physiques et Naturelles of Bordeaux with an explanatory text the following year. The Club alpin français directory followed with the publication of an enthusiastic review, describing Schrader as qualified for "first rank topographer in a glorious master stroke". In 1876 he took part in the creation of the Bordeaux section of the Club Alpin Français, becoming its first president.

In 1877 he traveled to Paris with a recommendation from his cousins Élisée and Onésime Reclus. There, having met Émile Templier, nephew and collaborator of Louis Hachette, and Adolphe Joanne, president of the Parisian section of the Club Alpin Français, he was employed as a geographer by Librairie Hachette and was able to practice his passion in the scope of his profession. He also gave geography lessons at the School of Anthropology, and became editor of the French Alpine Club directory.

On August 11, 1878, accompanied by high-mountain guide Henri Passet, he carried out the first known ascension of the Grand Batchimale (3,176 m), consequently renamed pic Schrader.

In 1880, he was promoted director of cartography for Hachette and aimed at surpassing in quality the Stieler Atlas, by German Adolf Stieler. On November 25, 1897, as vice-president of the C.A.F. he convened a conference at the Club Alpin which constituted his true esthetic credo of the mountain and in which he announced the imminent foundation of a French school of mountain painting. The conference text title was : À quoi tient la beauté des montagnes (What makes the beauty of mountains); this speech is considered as the birth bulletin of la Société des peintres de montagne (Paris) and its text is reproduced in 1898 in the Club Alpin Français directory.

From 1901 to 1904, he presided over le Club Alpin Français. He also actively contributed to the Guides Joanne of the Librairie Hachette, which in 1919 became the Guides bleus.

The scientific commission created by Franz Schrader in the Club Alpin Français still exists today, as well as the Société des Peintres de Montagne.

He died in Paris in 1924. In 1927 his remains were transferred to a tomb on a slope of the cirque de Gavarnie.

== The orograph ==
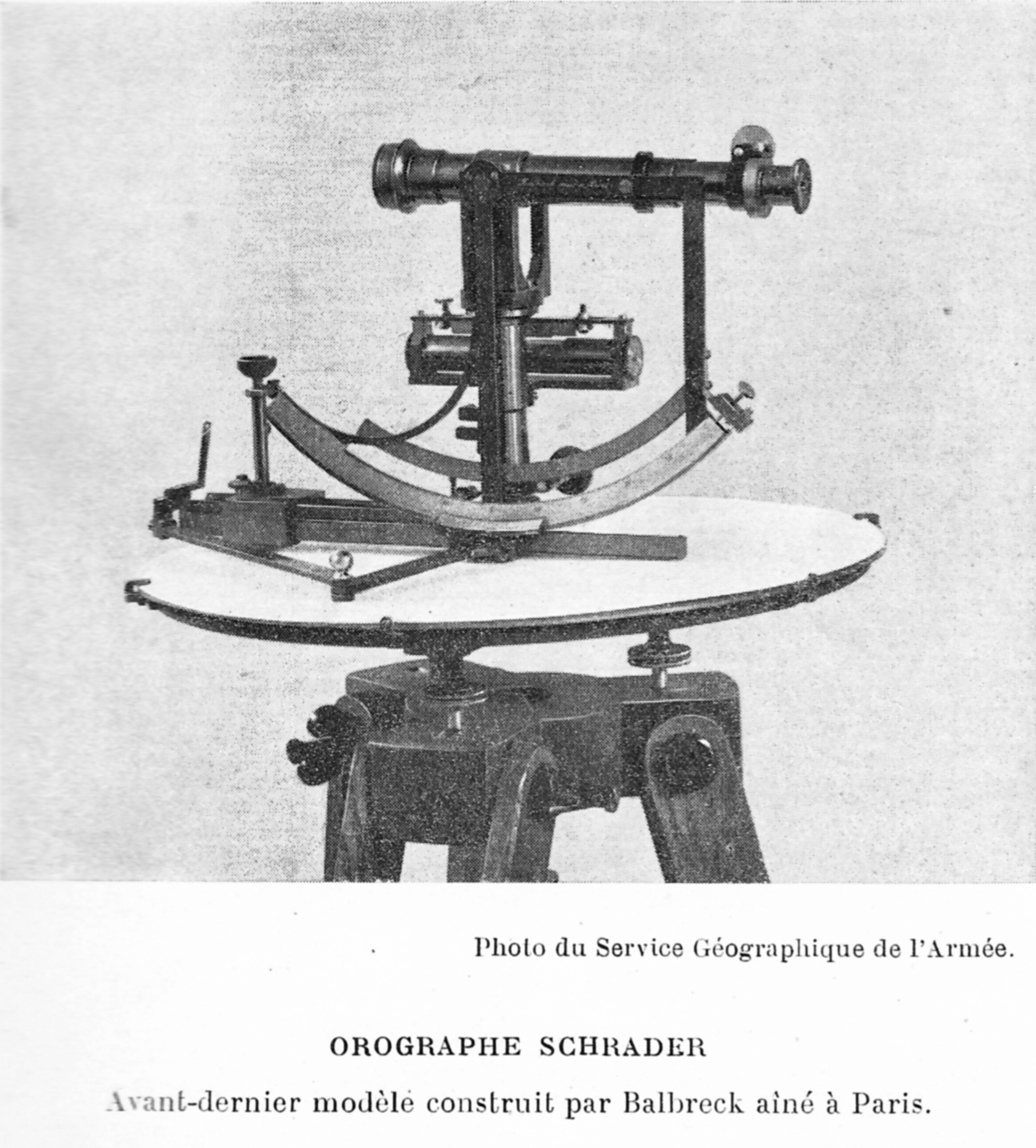
Model of orograph built in 1885 upon Schrader's directives

Named from the ancient Greek word for "mountain", and -graph, the orograph was developed at the turn of the 1870s. It was designed to take precise measurements of mountains. One of its characteristics is its ease of transport: it is small enough to be carried while scrambling in the mountains.

It is equipped with a sort of telescope that the operator moves along the relief, linked to a rule carrying a pen. The pen draws onto a paper disk that registers the lines on which the telescope is aimed. It thus creates an instant graph of said relief.

== Œuvres ==
=== Atlas ===
- Atlas de géographie universelle (continuation de l'œuvre de Vivien de Saint-Martin
- 1890 : Atlas de géographie moderne (directeur de la cartographie)
- 1893 : Atlas de géographie historique (id.)
- de 1891 à 1914 : l'Année cartographique (id.)
- Franz Schrader et Louis Gallouédec, Atlas classique de géographie ancienne et moderne, Paris : Hachette, 1905. 96 cartes et index de 13 pages.
- 1923 : Atlas universel de géographie

=== Topography ===
- 1874 : map of the massif Gavarnie - Mont Perdu, à 1/40 000 (avec Lourde-Rocheblave).
- 1886–1891 : map of the whole Pyrénées, topographique et géologique, à 1/80 000.
- 1882–1892 : map of central Pyrénées at 1/100 000.
- 1914 : carte de Gavarnie - Mont Perdu, à 1/20 000.

=== Paintings ===
- le Cirque de Gavarnie
- la Grande Cascade de Gavarnie
- le Lac Glacé du Mont-Perdu
- le Massif de la Maladetta
- Panorama du mont Blanc (presented at the pavillon du Club alpin français, during l'Exposition universelle of 1900)
- le Pic du Midi d'Ossau
- le Vignemale

Non-comprehensive list (several hundreds of landscape paintings)

=== Geography lessons ===
In collaboration with Henri Lemonnier :

- Éléments de géographie, rédigés suivant les programmes de l'enseignement primaire. Cours élémentaire, Paris : Hachette, 1881
- Éléments de géographie, rédigés suivant les programmes de l'enseignement primaire. Cours moyen, Paris : Hachette, 1883
- Éléments de géographie, rédigés suivant les programmes de l'enseignement primaire. Cours supérieur, Paris : Hachette, 1883

In collaboration with Louis Gallouédec :

- High number of geography school manuels (secondary), Paris, Hachette, collection "Schrader et Gallouédec"

=== Other ===
- Études géographiques et excursions dans le massif du Mont-Perdu, Paris : Gauthier-Villars, 1875
- Franz Schrader, Xavier Blanc et E. Levasseur, Adolphe Joanne, 1813–1881, Paris, impr. de G. Chamerot, s. d., 24 p.
- Le Facteur planétaire de l'évolution humaine, Paris : V. Giard et E. Brière, 1902, 15 pages
- Pyrénées. Tome I : Courses et ascensions, Toulouse : É. Privat, 1936. With foreword, by Dr Georges Sabatier, and Franz Schrader, esquisse biographique, by Maurice Heïd
- Pyrénées. Tome II : Science et art, Paris : Éd. Didier, 1936. Suivi d'Essai de biblio-iconographie, par Maurice Heïd

== Honours ==
- 1889 : chevalier de la Légion d'honneur
- 1928 : grande médaille d'or de la Société géographique de Paris (à titre posthume)

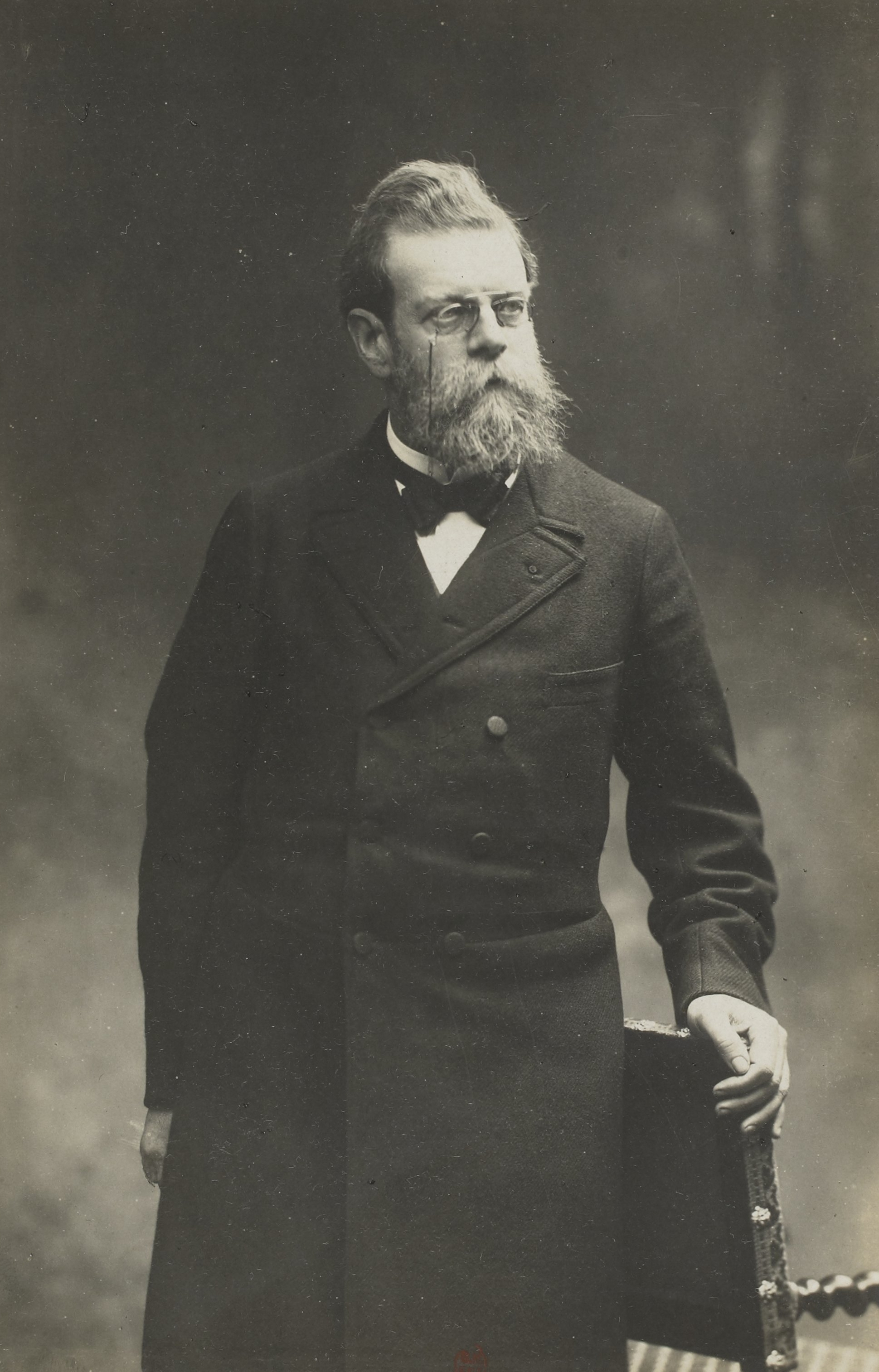
Franz Schrader as General Commissioner at the 1900' Exposition Universelle, Paris
