= Marius Chesneau =

Cartographer

Map of Africa extracted from the "Universal Atlas" by Vivien de Saint-Martin and Franz Schrader, drawn by Marius Chesneau

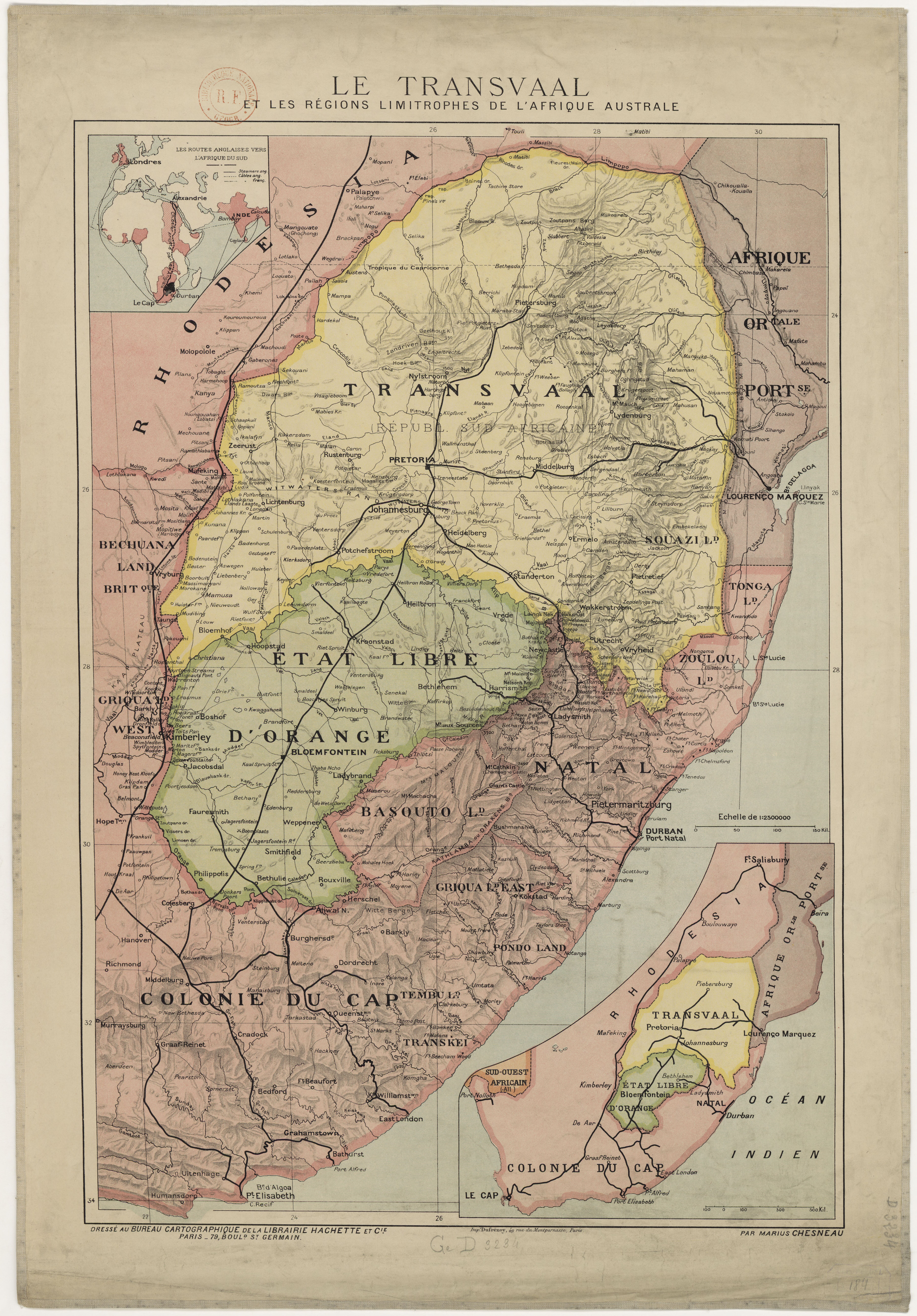
Transvaal and the border regions of southern Africa map by Marius Chesneau

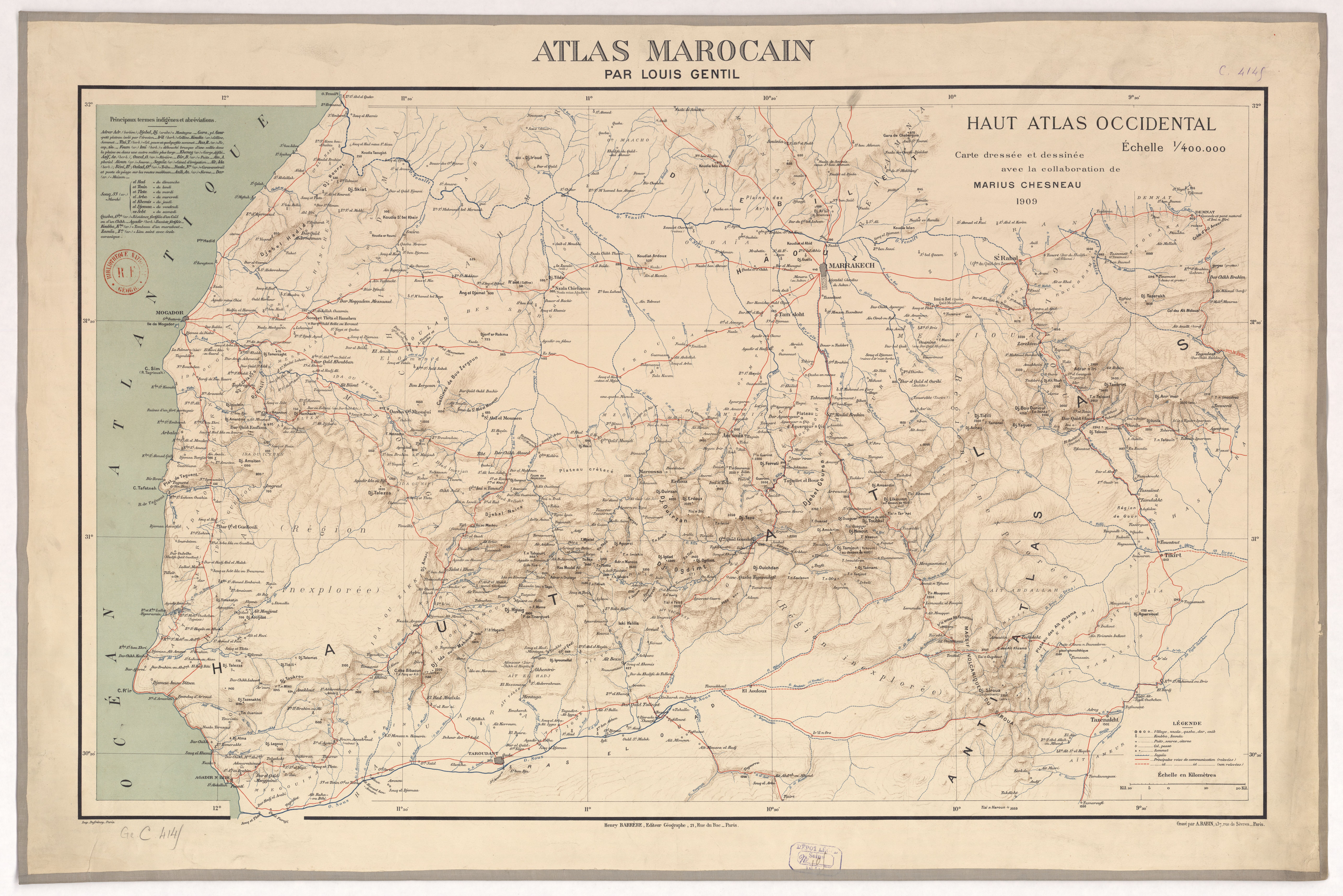
Map from French geologist Louis Gentil's Atlas of Morocco "with the collaboration" of Chesneau (1909)

M. Marius Chesneau was a cartographer who made maps of Africa and African countries.

He made an 1889 map of the Transvaal. He made a map of Ethiopia printed in 1897. His map of Morocco and the Ubangi River and Chari River was printed in 1913.

== See also ==
- Victor Huot (cartographer)
