= Saint-Martin-de-May =

- Commune
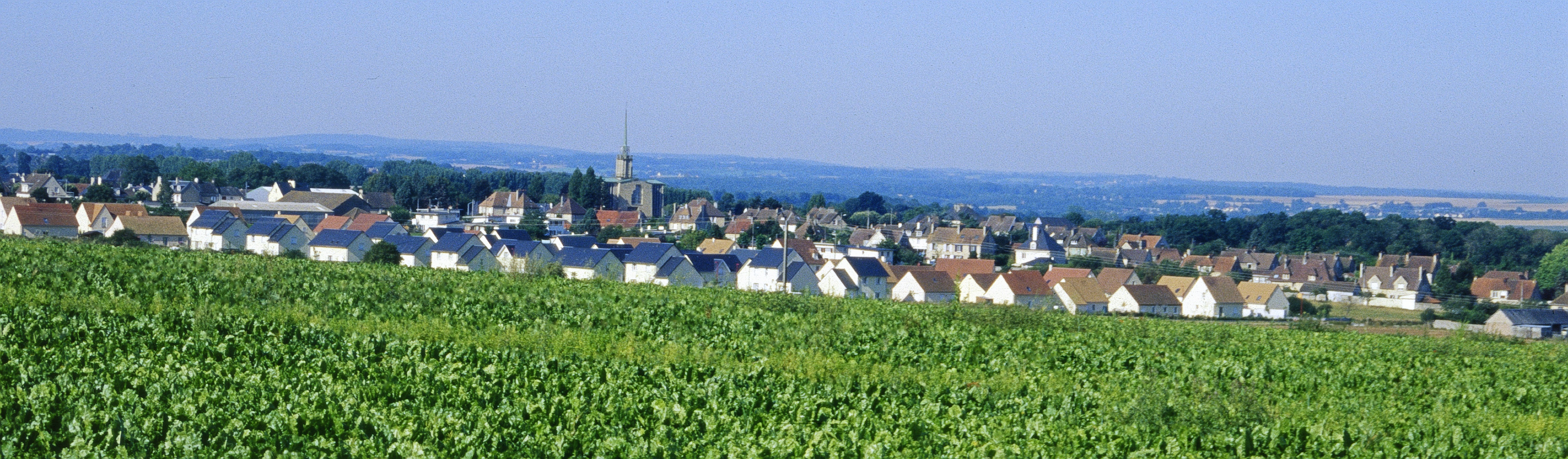
- A general view of May-sur-Orne
- Location of Saint-Martin-de-May
- Location within France Location within Normandy
- Coordinates: 49°06′03″N 0°22′21″W
- Country: France
- Region: Normandy
- Department: Calvados
- Arrondissement: Caen
- Canton: Évrecy

Government
  - Mayor (2025–2026): Jean-Luc Mottais
- Area^{1}: 14.21 km^{2} (5.49 sq mi)
- Highest elevation: 87 m (285 ft)
- Lowest elevation: 5 m (16 ft)
- Population (2023): 4,529
  - Density: 318.7/km^{2} (825.5/sq mi)
- Time zone: UTC+01:00 (CET)
  - Summer (DST): UTC+02:00 (CEST)
- INSEE/Postal code: 14408 /14320
- ^{1} French Land Register data, which excludes lakes, ponds, glaciers > 1 km^{2} (0.386 sq mi or 247 acres) and river estuaries.

Saint-Martin-de-May is a commune in the Calvados department in the Normandy region in northwestern France. It was formed on 1 January 2025, with the merger of May-sur-Orne and Saint-Martin-de-Fontenay.

== Geography ==
The commune is made up of the following collection of villages and hamlets, Verrières, Saint-Martin-de-Fontenay and May-sur-Orne.

Two rivers, the Orne and the Laize flow through the commune.

== Population ==
Population data refer to the commune in its geography as of January 2025.

Historical population
Year	Pop.	±% p.a.
1968	1,980	—
1975	2,559	+3.73%
1982	2,763	+1.10%
1990	3,519	+3.07%
1999	3,597	+0.24%
2007	4,077	+1.58%
2012	4,367	+1.38%
2017	4,520	+0.69%
2023	4,529	+0.03%
Source: INSEE

== Points of Interest ==
=== National Heritage sites ===
- Eglise paroissiale Saint-Firmin the church was built in 1960 and listed as a monument in 2010.

== Notable people ==
- Vivien de Saint-Martin - (1802 – 1896) a 19th-century geographer was born here in Saint-Martin-de-Fontenay.
- Arlette Ben Hamo - (born 1930) is a former track and field athlete who competed in the women's pentathlon, was born here in Saint-Martin-de-Fontenay.
- Pascal Mahé - (born 1963) is a former handball player and current coach, who was born in May-sur-Orne.

== Twin towns – sister cities ==
Saint-Martin-de-May is twinned with:

- Stockstadt am Main, Germany, since 1993.

== See also ==
- Communes of the Calvados department
