= Hôtel de Ville, Saint-Jean-de-Braye =

Town hall in Saint-Jean-de-Braye, France

Hôtel de Ville
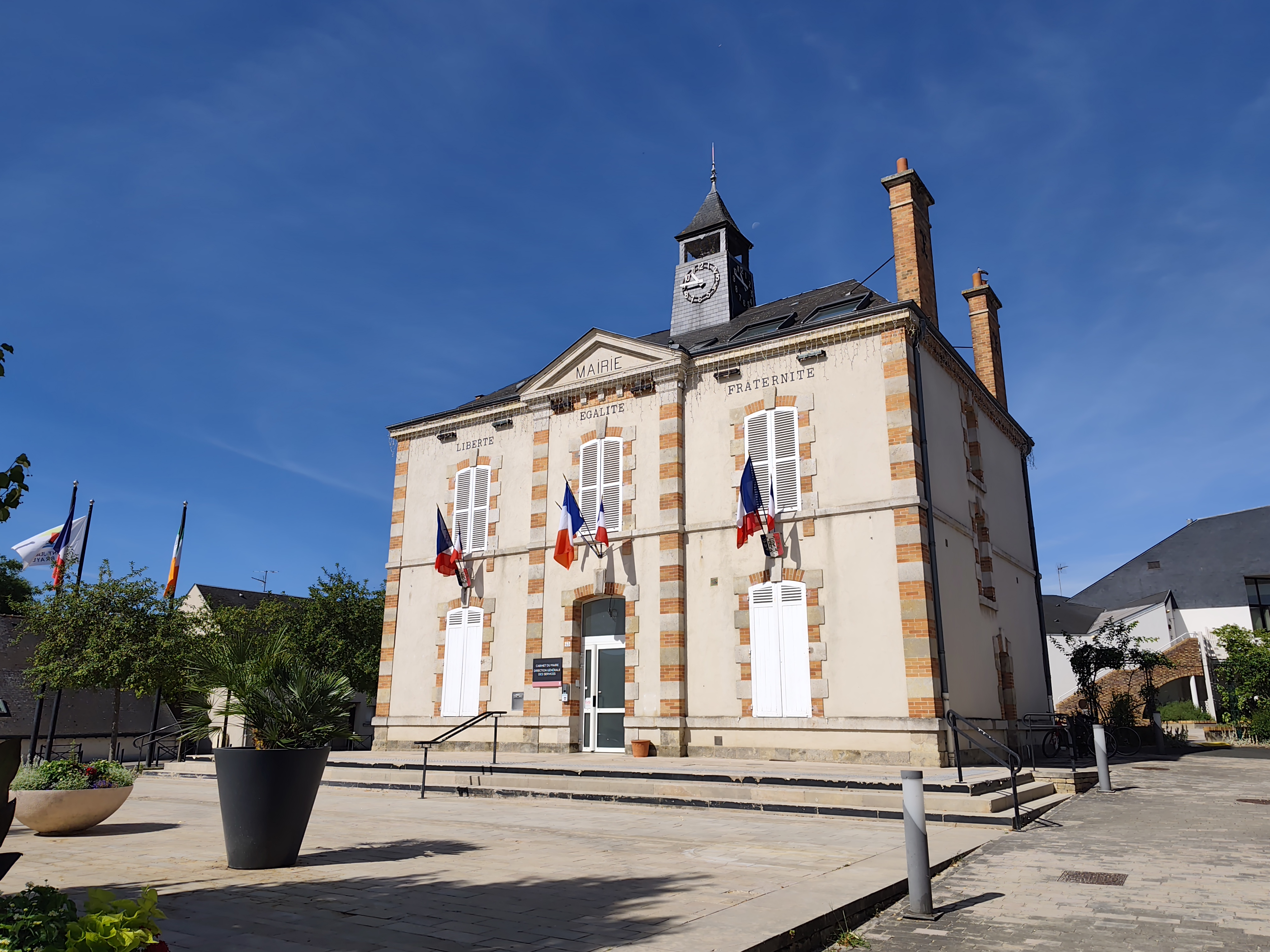
- The main frontage of the Hôtel de Ville in July 2026
- Interactive map of the Hôtel de Ville area

General information
- Type: City hall
- Architectural style: Neoclassical style
- Location: Saint-Jean-de-Braye, France
- Coordinates: 47.9121°N 1.9709°E
- Completed: 1893

The Hôtel de Ville (French pronunciation: [otɛl də vil], City Hall) is a municipal building in Saint-Jean-de-Braye, Loiret, in north-central France, standing on Rue de la Mairie.

== History ==
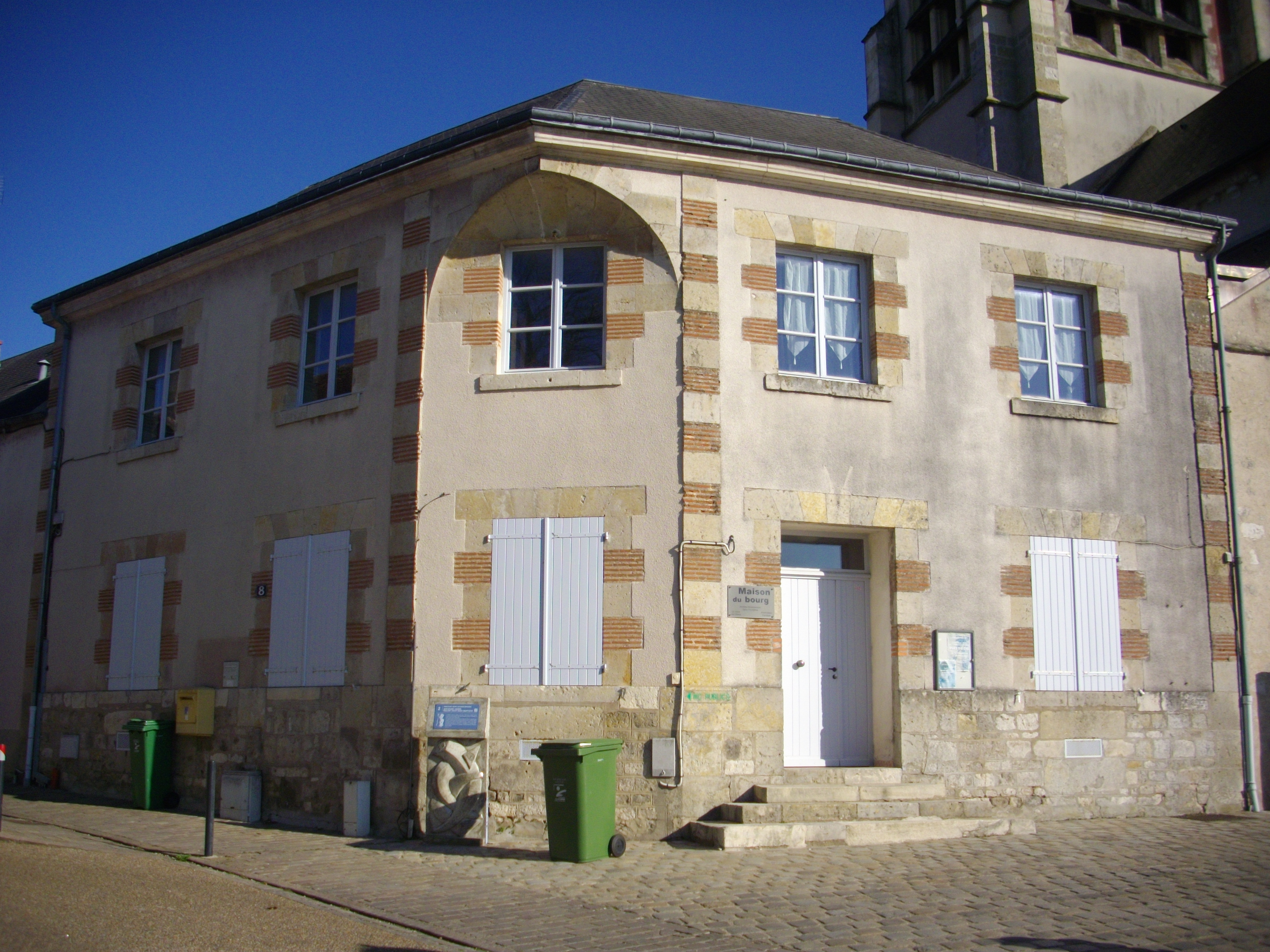
The old town hall

=== The old town hall ===
Following the French Revolution the town council initially met in the house of the mayor at the time. This arrangement continued until the early 1840s, when the council led by the mayor, Jules Dulong, decided to commission a combined town hall and school. The site they selected, on Place de l'Église, was to the immediate north of the Church of Saint-Jean-Baptiste. The new building was designed in the neoclassical style, built in ashlar stone and was completed in 1843.

The design involved a canted main frontage of one bay on the corner of Rue Jeanne d'Arc and Place de l'Église, with side elevations stretching back along each of the two streets. The corner bay was fenestrated by casement windows on both floors and there was a concave stone arch, which acted as a canopy, above the first-floor window. Access was through a doorway in the first bay on the left on Place de l'Église, and the rest of the building was fenestrated in a similar style. After the building was no longer required for municipal use, it was rented out until 1927, when it was sold for commercial use. It was brought back into public ownership in 1956 and rented out again until 1969. It then served as a local music school from 1976, and as the home of the organisation, Amities Abraysiennes Sans Frontières, which provides support to people from the local area, from 2005.

=== The current building ===
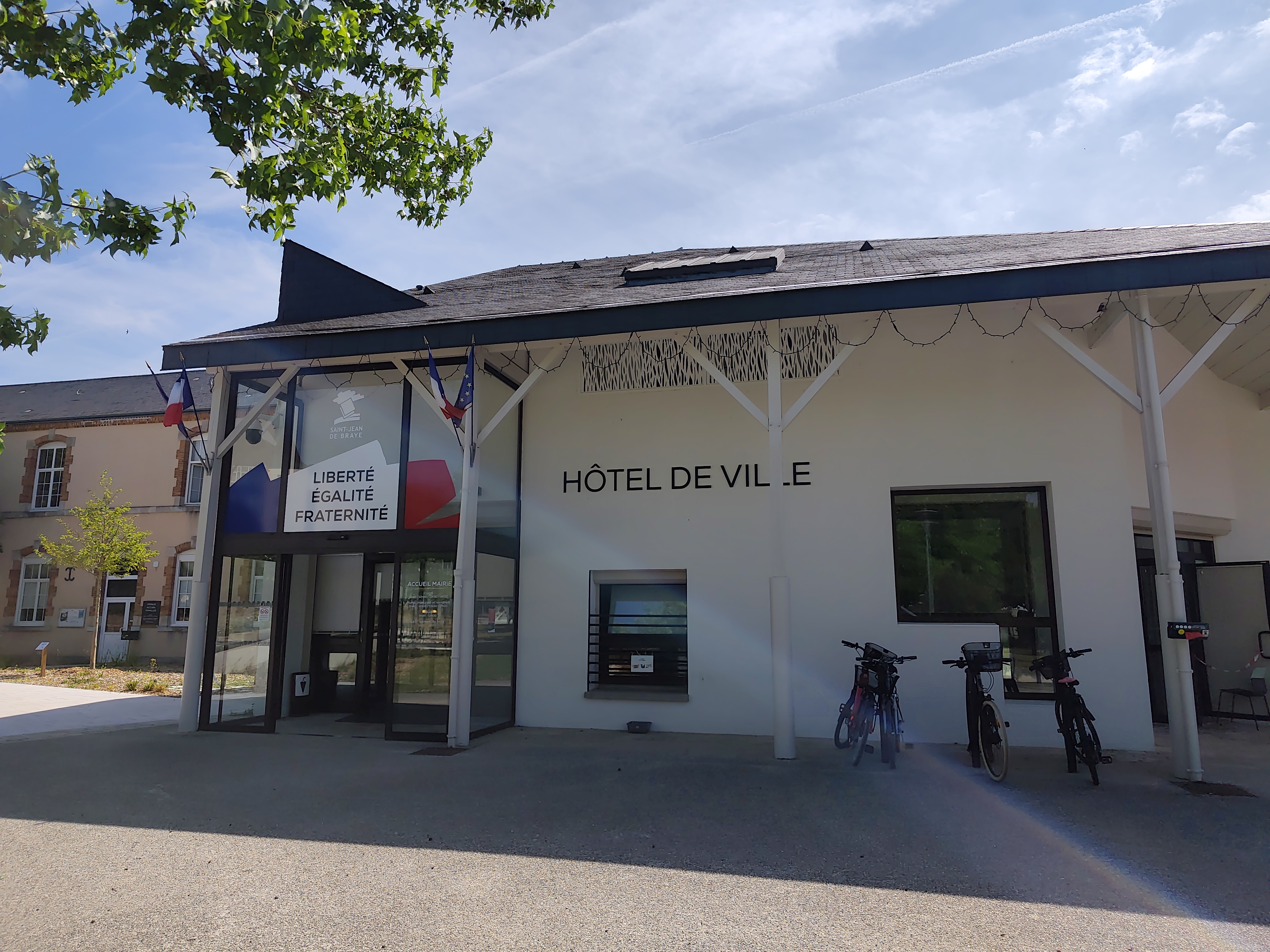
Modern extension at the rear of the current town hall

In the late 19th century, following significant population growth, the council led by the mayor, Pierre-Émile Rossignol, decided to establish a more substantial town hall as well as a new school. The site they selected was on marshy land approximately 1.1 kilometres (0.68 mi) northeast of the old part of the town. The project faced strong opposition from local people who initiated a petition objecting to the location which they considered to be low-lying and damp. Nevertheless, the new buildings went ahead. The new town hall was designed in the neoclassical style, built in brick with a cement render finish and was officially opened by the mayor on 10 October 1893.

The design involved a symmetrical main frontage of three bays facing onto what is now Rue de la Mairie. The central bay featured a segmental-headed doorway on the ground floor and a segmental-headed window on the first floor. The central bay was flanked by full-height pilasters supporting a pediment with the word "Mairie" inscribed in the tympanum. The outer bays were fenestrated in a similar style and also flanked by full-height pilasters.

A war memorial, in the form of an obelisk, intended to commemorate the lives of local service personnel who had died in the First World War, was unveiled in the square in front of the town hall by the mayor, Louis Gallouédec, on 13 November 1921. A community hall, now known as the Salle des Fêtes, was erected on the south side of the square in front of the town hall and was officially opened by the Minister of National Education, Jean Zay, in 1936. After the Second World War, the square itself was renamed Place de Gaulle.

The complex was also subsequently extended to the rear to create a modern public-facing area. Internally, the principal room was the new Salle du Conseil (council chamber), which was refurbished in 2023, and the reception area, which was refurbished in 2024.
