= Stockstadt am Main =

Stockstadt a.Main
- Municipality
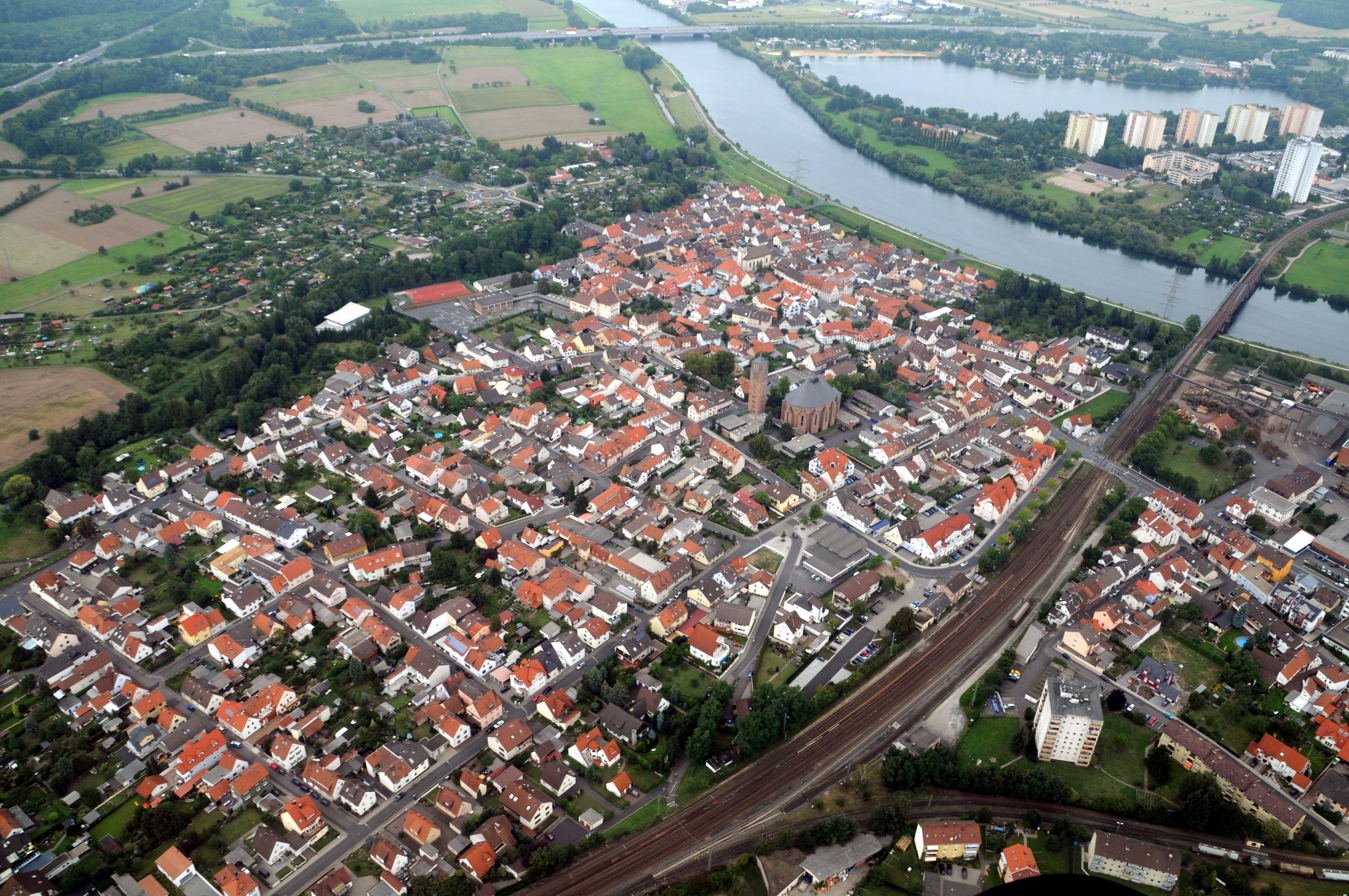
- Aerial view of the town

- Coat of arms

- Location of Stockstadt a.Main within Aschaffenburg district
- Interactive map of Stockstadt a.Main
- Location within Germany Location within Bavaria
- Coordinates: 49°58′47″N 09°03′50″E
- Country: Germany
- State: Bavaria
- Admin. region: Unterfranken
- District: Aschaffenburg

Government
  - Mayor (2020–26): Rafael Herbrik (SPD)

Area
  - Total: 18.87 km^{2} (7.29 sq mi)
- Elevation: 117 m (384 ft)

Population (2025-12-31)
  - Total: 7,852
  - Density: 416.1/km^{2} (1,078/sq mi)
- Time zone: UTC+01:00 (CET)
  - Summer (DST): UTC+02:00 (CEST)
- Postal codes: 63809-63811
- Dialling codes: 06027
- Vehicle registration: AB
- Website: www.stockstadt-am-main.de

Gemeindeteile

Stockstadt am Main (German pronunciation: [ˈʃtɔkʃtat ʔam ˈmaɪn], lit. 'Stockstadt on the Main'; officially: Stockstadt a.Main) is a market municipality in the Aschaffenburg district in the Regierungsbezirk of Lower Franconia (Unterfranken) in Bavaria, Germany.

The settlement was established by the Romans who built a fort here in the 1st century AD. Stockstadt has a population of around 8,000 (2020).

== Geography ==
=== Location ===
Stockstadt am Main lies on Aschaffenburg’s western town limit on the Main’s left bank. To Stockstadt’s west and northwest runs the boundary with Hesse, and southwest of Stockstadt lies the Bachgau.

=== Neighbouring municipalities ===
To the south is the municipality of Großostheim, and to the southwest, beyond the state boundary, in Hesse, lies Babenhausen; northwest lie Mainhausen and Seligenstadt.

The nearest neighbouring municipalities are Kleinostheim to the north and Mainaschaff to the east.

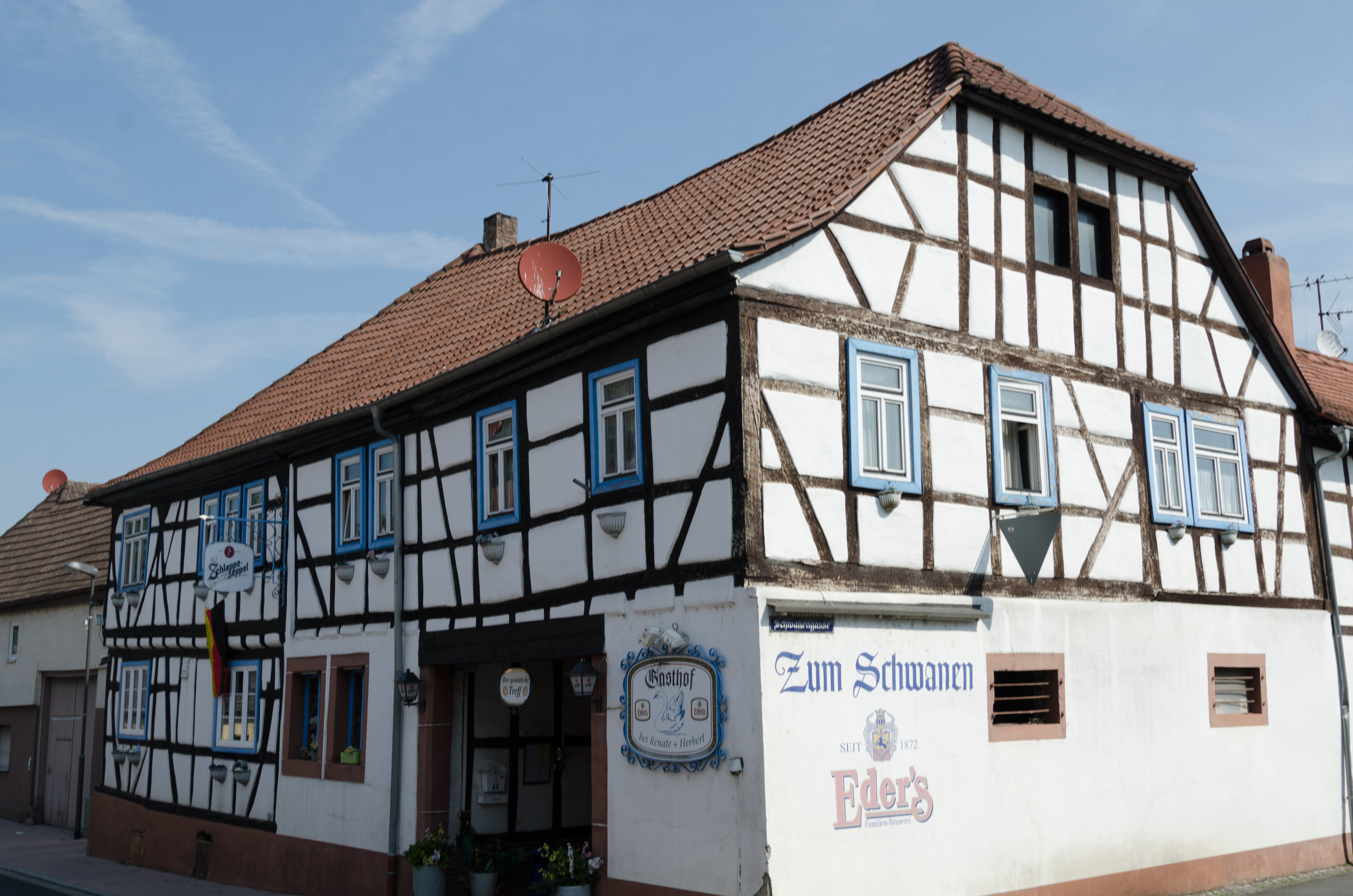
Stockstadt am Main

== History ==
The Romans built a castrum at Stockstadt, as part of the Limes Germanicus. In the 1st century AD a small earthen fortification was erected. Around the year 100 it was replaced by a full cohort fort further to the southeast. This castrum had a size of 3.2 ha. Over time, it was occupied by the cohorts III Aquitanorum, II Hispanorum and I Aquitanorum. Stockstadt was also the site of a "de:Benefiziarer station" (i.e. a road house).

After the withdrawal of the Romans from the area, the regional population declined. Burgundians and Alemanni moved through the lower Main region, but it was only under the Franks (after 500 AD) that the population density again rose noticeably. Their settlements often did not simply grow out of the formerly Roman cores but included separate newly established sites.

At Stockstadt, a Frankish graveyard was discovered to the northwest of the Roman structures. The Frankish settlement was likely located nearby, on the right bank of the Gersprenz, north of the former Roman structures. The initial parish church and graveyard were located not in this area but around 700 meters to the southeast, at the location of the former castrum. It is likely that a separate settlement was still in existence then at this site and it may even have been more important than the other site. The parish church was dedicated to the saints Marcellinus and Peter, the patrons of Seligenstadt Abbey, to which Stockstadt temporarily belonged. It is unclear, whether this settlement was later abandoned or moved to the northwest. Later during the Middle Ages, the settlement between Gersprenz and Main was fortified by a wall with towers and moat. The church initially remained at the southeasterly location, however. At the site of the current church, the Leonhardskirche, remains of an earlier structure only date from the Gothic period.

Stockstadt am Main had its first documentary mention as early as the 9th century, if only through some townsmen who were obliged to pay taxes. These are listed as living in Stocestat, as the municipality was known then.

Eventually the municipality itself was named in writing for the first time in 1024. Stoddenstat was donated to Fulda Abbey by Henry II, Holy Roman Emperor. This lasted until 1309, when Stockstadt was given to the Archbishopric of Mainz.

In the Middle Ages the surrounding forests belonged to the Dreieich Royal Hunting Forest (Wildbann Dreieich), which also had one of its 30 Wildhuben (farming estates whose owners were charged with guarding the king's hunting rights) in Stockstadt.

== Governance ==
=== Municipal council ===
The council is made up of 21 council members, counting the full-time mayor.

	CSU	SPD	Freie Wählergemeinschaft	Total
2002	7	10+1(mayor)	3	21 seats
2008	10+1(mayor)	7	3	21 seats

(as at municipal election held on 2 March 2008)

Elections in 2014:

- CSU: 9
- SPD: 8
- Free voters: 4
- Total: 21 (with mayor)

=== Town partnerships ===
- Saint-André-sur-Orne, Calvados, France
- Saint-Martin-de-Fontenay, Calvados, France
- May-sur-Orne, Calvados, France

=== Coat of arms ===
The municipality's arms might be described thus: Azure a fess wavy abased argent above which a legionnaire's helmet of the second crested gules in profile.

== Attractions ==
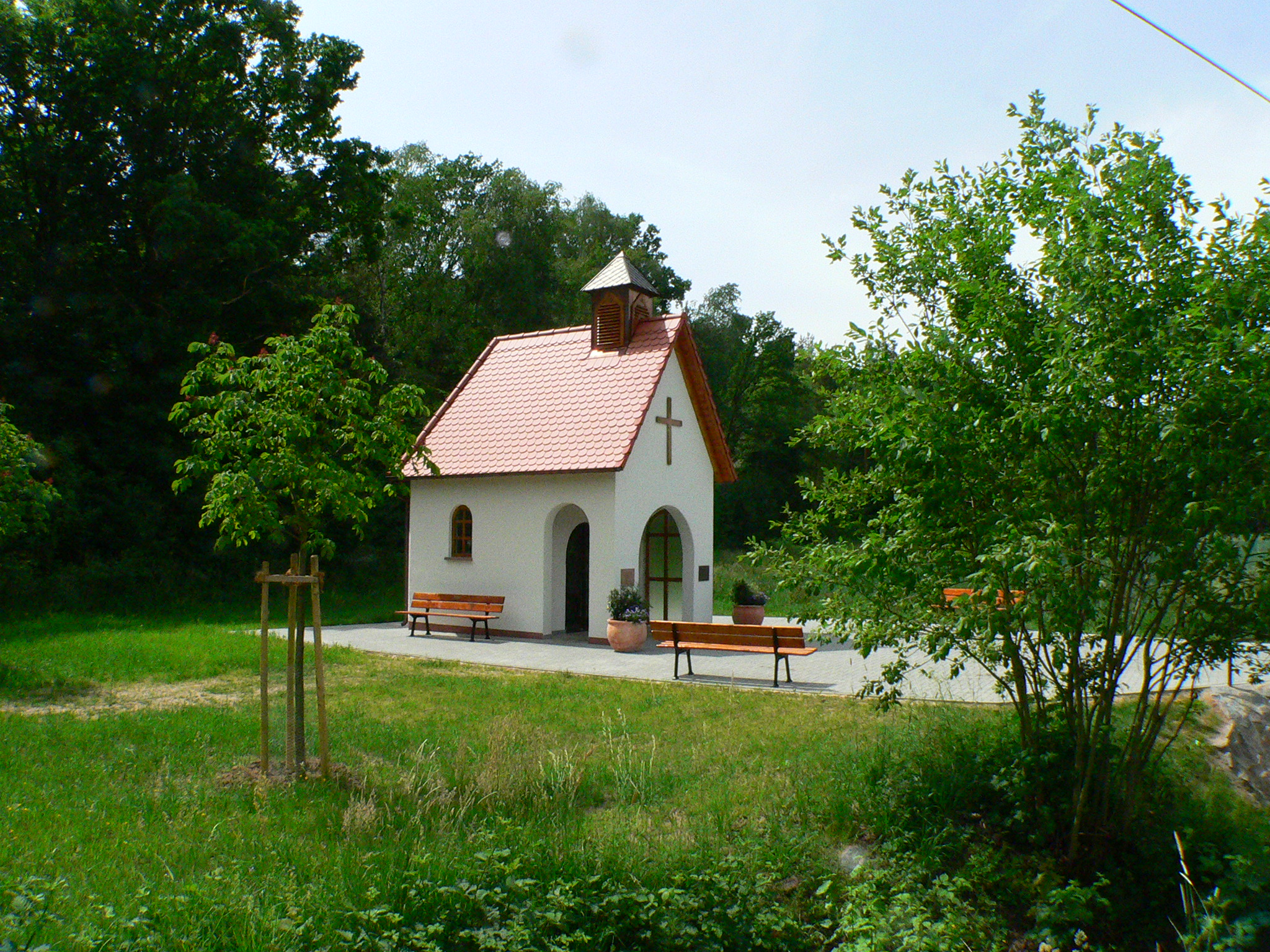
St. Anna-Kapelle

- The Zollhaus ("Customs House") on Hauptstraße long served the Elector-Archbishop of Mainz Albrecht von Brandenburg. It was built between 1514 and 1545. However, the site likely was the location of an older water castle.
- The Leonharduskirche (Saint Leonard's Church) is likewise found in the old centre of Stockstadt and dates back to the year 1773. The foundation of the tower is older, built in Gothic style.
- The St. Anna-Kapelle originally stood on the corner of Hauptstraße and Alter Stadtweg. It was demolished in January 1925 as a result of a decision by the municipal council. In 2007, the chapel was rebuilt on the historical model at another site to the west beyond Bundesstraße 469 towards Auhof, and dedicated on 6 April 2008.
