= Saint-Jean-de-Braye =

Saint-Jean de Braye
- Commune
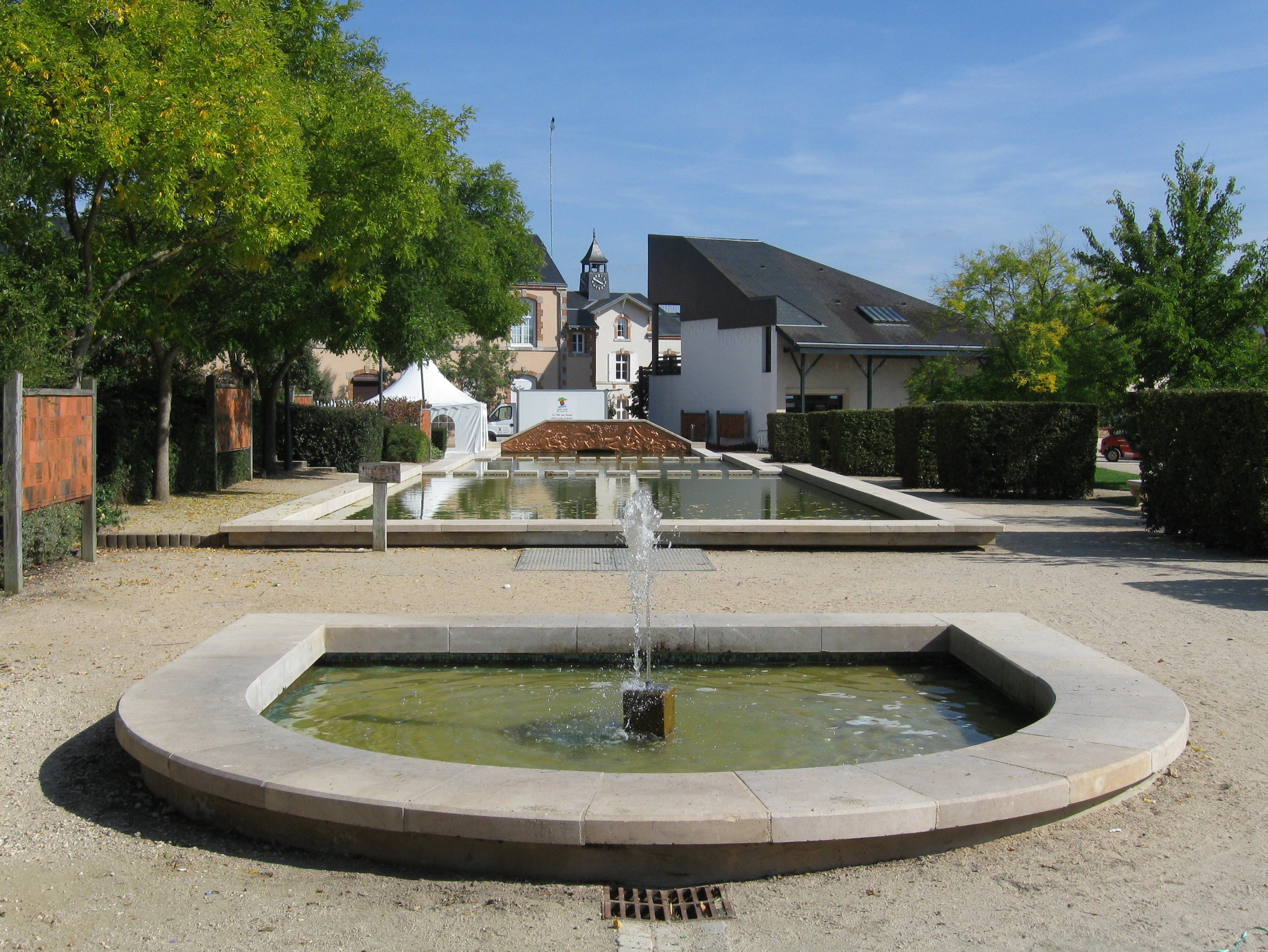
- Town hall gardens

- Coat of arms
- Location of Saint-Jean de Braye
- Location within France Location within Centre-Val de Loire
- Coordinates: 47°54′46″N 1°58′19″E
- Country: France
- Region: Centre-Val de Loire
- Department: Loiret
- Arrondissement: Orléans
- Canton: Saint-Jean-de-Braye
- Intercommunality: Orléans Métropole

Government
  - Mayor (2020–2026): Vanessa Slimani
- Area^{1}: 13.7 km^{2} (5.3 sq mi)
- Elevation: 100 m (330 ft)
- Highest elevation: 127 m (417 ft)
- Lowest elevation: 95 m (312 ft)
- Population (2023): 23,147
  - Density: 1,690/km^{2} (4,380/sq mi)
- Time zone: UTC+01:00 (CET)
  - Summer (DST): UTC+02:00 (CEST)
- INSEE/Postal code: 45284 /45800
- ^{1} French Land Register data, which excludes lakes, ponds, glaciers > 1 km^{2} (0.386 sq mi or 247 acres) and river estuaries.

Saint-Jean-de-Braye (French pronunciation: [sɛ̃ ʒɑ̃ də bʁɛ]) is a commune in the Loiret department in north-central France. It is an eastern suburb of Orléans. The organist and musicologist Norbert Dufourcq (1904–1990) was born in the commune.

On 14 February 2020, the municipal council voted unanimously to suspend the twin towns partnership with the Polish Tuchów as a result of the controversial anti-LGBT resolution passed by the Tuchów authorities.

== History ==
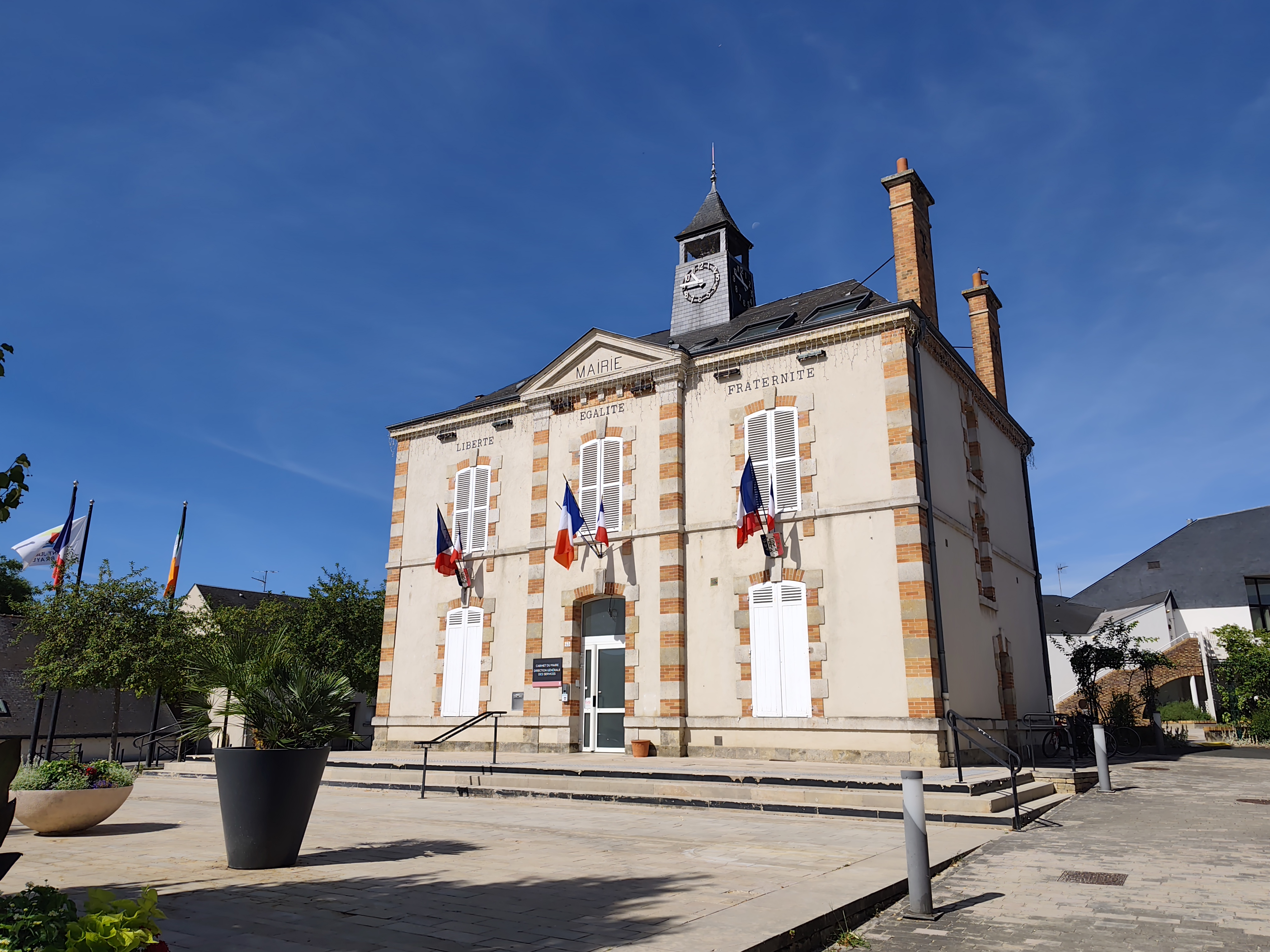
The Hôtel de Ville

The Hôtel de Ville was completed in 1893.

== Population ==
Historical population

Year	Pop.	±% p.a.
1793	880	—
1800	1,114	+3.43%
1806	1,095	−0.29%
1821	1,089	−0.04%
1831	1,269	+1.54%
1836	1,287	+0.28%
1841	2,304	+12.35%
1846	2,306	+0.02%
1851	1,404	−9.45%
1856	1,507	+1.43%
1861	1,568	+0.80%
1866	1,648	+1.00%
1872	1,740	+0.91%
1876	1,877	+1.91%
1881	1,905	+0.30%
1886	1,962	+0.59%
1891	1,911	−0.53%
1896	1,985	+0.76%
1901	1,858	−1.31%

Year	Pop.	±% p.a.
1906	1,852	−0.06%
1911	1,994	+1.49%
1921	2,012	+0.09%
1926	2,207	+1.87%
1931	2,635	+3.61%
1936	2,642	+0.05%
1946	3,577	+3.08%
1954	4,146	+1.86%
1962	6,619	+6.02%
1968	7,601	+2.33%
1975	12,120	+6.89%
1982	13,318	+1.36%
1990	16,387	+2.63%
1999	17,758	+0.90%
2007	18,626	+0.60%
2012	19,404	+0.82%
2017	20,751	+1.35%
2023	23,147	+1.84%

Source: EHESS and INSEE (1968-2023)

== See also ==
- Communes of the Loiret department
