= Guide Bleu =

Series of French-language travel guides

The Guide Bleu is a series of French-language travel guides published by Hachette Livre, which started in 1841 as the Guide Joanne.

Among Hachette's several guidebook series, the Guide Bleu is addressed to those seeking "discovery in depth".

== History ==
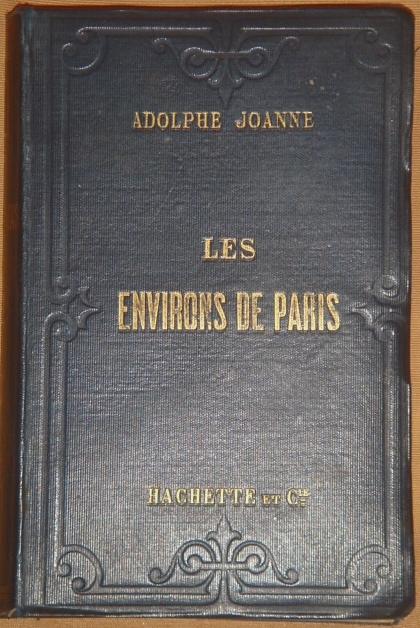

Starting with a guide to Switzerland (1841), Adolphe Joanne published a series of guidebooks in France under the name Guides Joanne. This was sold to Louis Hachette in 1855.

From 1917 to 1933, Hachette collaborated with the publisher of the British Blue Guide series, and the Guides Joanne were renamed the Guides bleus in 1919.
