= Transvaal =

Transvaal is a historical geographic term associated with land north of (i.e., beyond) the Vaal River in South Africa. A number of states and administrative divisions have carried the name Transvaal.

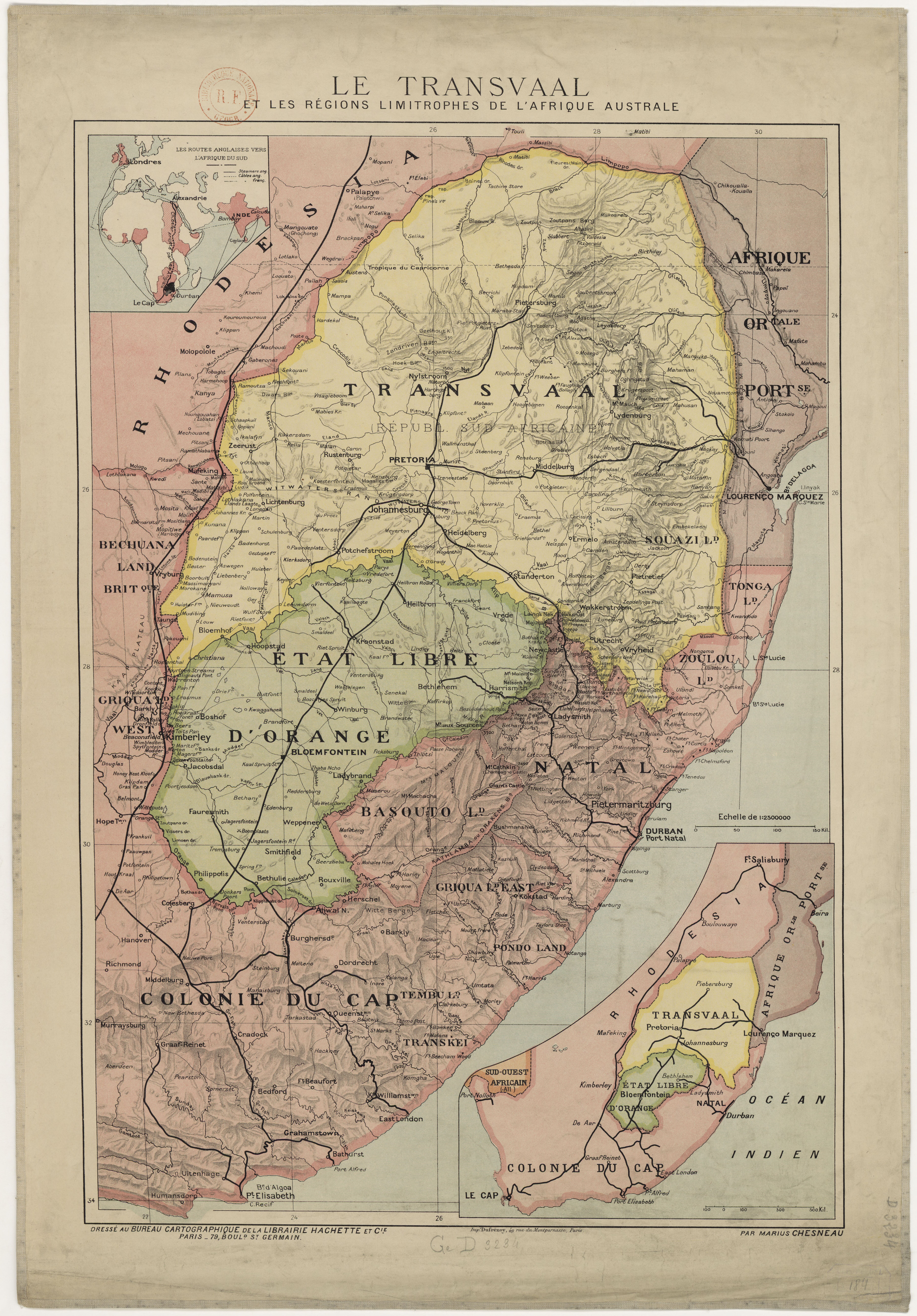
French map of the Transvaal and the border regions of southern Africa by Marius Chesneau (1899)

- South African Republic (1852–1902; Afrikaans: Zuid-Afrikaansche Republiek), a Boer republic also known as the Transvaal in English
- Transvaal Colony (1902–1910), British colony
- Transvaal (province) (1910–1994), province of the Union of South Africa and later the Republic of South Africa

== See also ==
- Transvaal Park, a Russian waterpark (2002–2004)
- Golden Lions, the modern South African rugby team formerly known as "Transvaal"
- Gauteng cricket team, the modern South African cricket team formerly known as "Transvaal"
- S.V. Transvaal, a football club located in Suriname, named after the South African region
- Gauteng Division, a division of the High Court of South Africa, formerly the Transvaal Provincial Division (1902–2009)
- Transvaal, an area of The Hague, The Netherlands
