= Guides Joanne =

French-language travel guide books

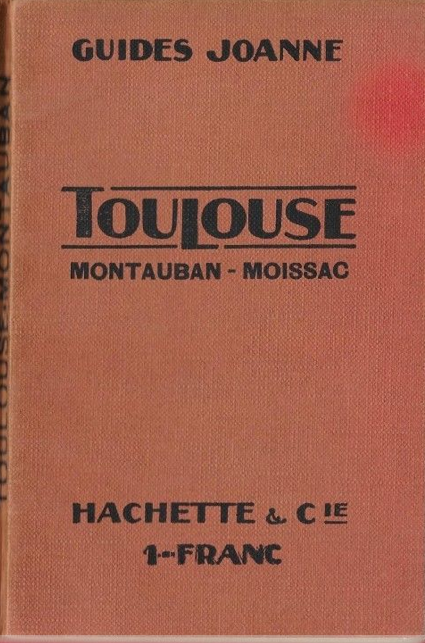
Cover of guide to Toulouse, 1914

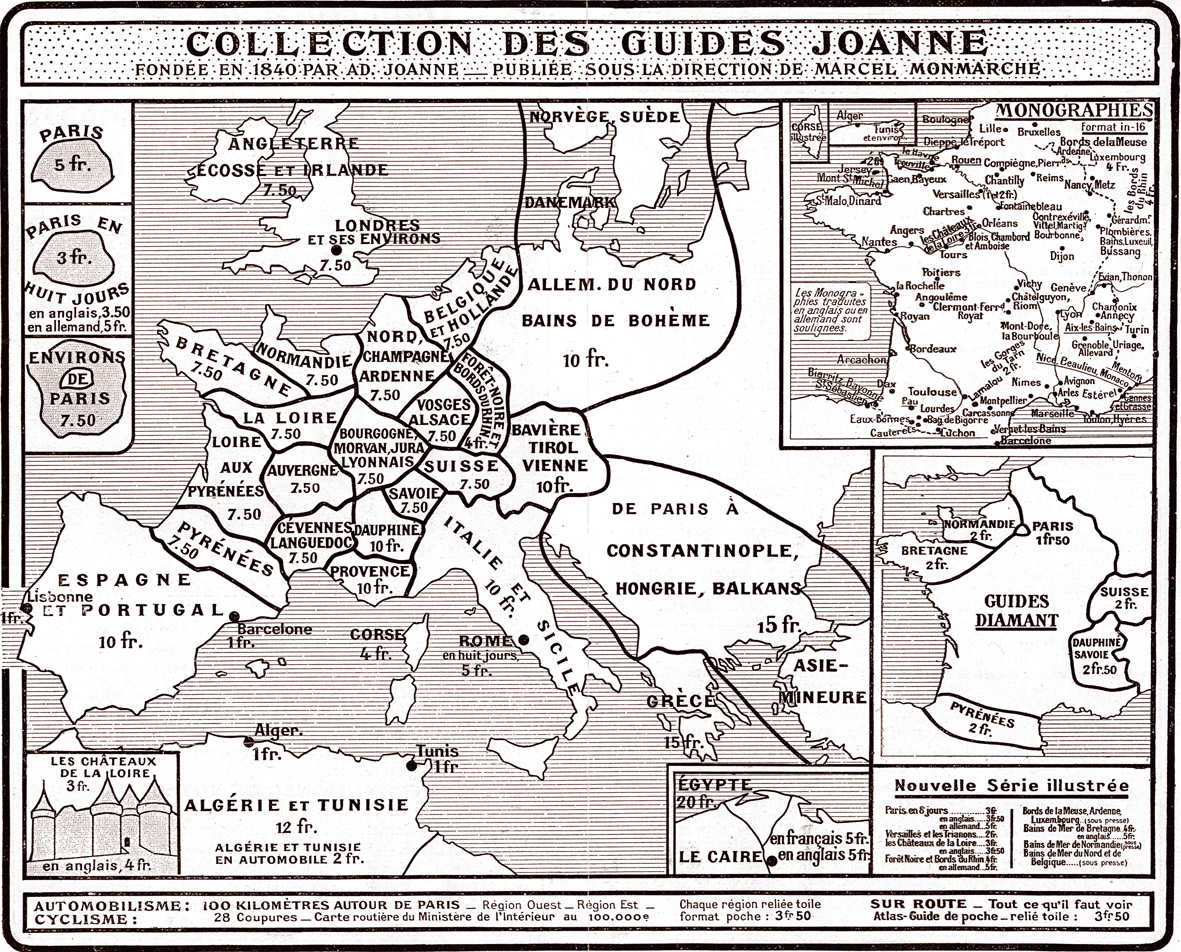
Map of geographic regions covered in the Guides Joanne series, 1912

Guides Joanne (est. 1841) was a series of French-language travel guide books to Europe founded by Adolphe Joanne and published in Paris. Routes followed the railways at first, and later volumes guided readers by province.

== Titles ==
- Adolphe Joanne (1841). Itineraire descriptif et historique de la suisse (in French). Paris: Paulin – via HathiTrust.
- Adolphe Joanne (1855). Itinéraire descriptif et historique des bords du Rhin, du Neckar et de la Moselle (in French). Paris: L. Maison.
- De Paris a Bordeaux (in French). Paris: Hachette. 1856.
- De Paris à Nantes (in French). circa 1856

=== 1860s-1880s ===
- Les bains d'Europe (in French), 1860, OCLC 77330822, OL 25091079M
- Itineraire descriptif et historique de l'Allemagne (in French) (2nd ed.), 1862, OL 24554335M
- Joanne, Adolphe (1862), De Poitiers à la Rochelle (in French)
- Guide Parisien (in French), 1863, OCLC 18592529
- Paris illustré (in French), 1867, OL 25192042M
- Célestin Port (1867). De Paris a Agen (in French).
- France: Le Nord. 1869. + index
- Èmile Isambert (1881). Itinéraire descriptif, historique et archéologique de l'Orient (in French).
  - v.1: Turkey + index
  - v.2: Egypt
  - v.3: Syria
- Louis Piesse (1888). Algérie et Tunisie (in French). hdl:2027/hvd.hn5e8a.
- Le Mans (in French), 1888

=== 1890s-1900s ===
- Joanne, Paul (1890). Bretagne (in French).
- Grece: Athenes. 1890
- Luxembourg. 1895
- Nancy (1895). Nancy (in French).
- Dijon (in French). hdl:2027/hvd.32044087927356. circa 1896
- Avignon et ses environs (in French). 1898.
- Savoie (in French). 1898.
- Les Vosges et l'Alsace. 1898. + contents
- Le Nord (in French). 1899.
- Alger. 1901
- Normandie (in French). 1901.
- Rouen (in French). 1901.
- Bordeaux (in French). 1902. hdl:2027/uc1.c105602300.
- Joanne, Paul (1902). Toulouse (in French).
- La Loire (in French). 1903.
- Tours (in French). 1905.
- Nice, Beaulieu and Monaco. 1906. (in English)
- Paul Joanne [in French] (1906). Provence (in French). hdl:2027/uc1.$b192331.
- Bourgogne, Morvan, Nivernais, Lyonnais (in French). 1907.
- Auvergne et centre (in French). 1908.

=== 1910s ===
- Belgique et Hollande. 1911. + index
- Pyrénées (in French). 1912. hdl:2027/njp.32101007980228.
- Vallée de la Meuse; Ardenne, Grotte de Han, Gd-Duché de Luxembourg. 1912
- Vosges, Lorraine, Alsace (in French). 1913.
- Cévennes, Languedoc (in French). 1914. hdl:2027/njp.32101064992173.
- Le Havre (in French). 1914. hdl:2027/uc1.31158008894346.
- Chartres.Maintenon, Rambouillet (in French). 1914. hdl:2027/njp.32101064992173.

=== 1920s ===
- Avignon, Villeneuve, Orange, Saint-Rémy, Arles, Les Baux (in French). 1921.

== See also ==
Guide Bleu, est. 1919

== Bibliography ==
- Daniel Nordman (1997). Pierre Nora (ed.). Les Guides-Joanne: ancêtres des Guides Bleus (in French). Gallimard.
