= May-sur-Orne =

- Part of Saint-Martin-de-May
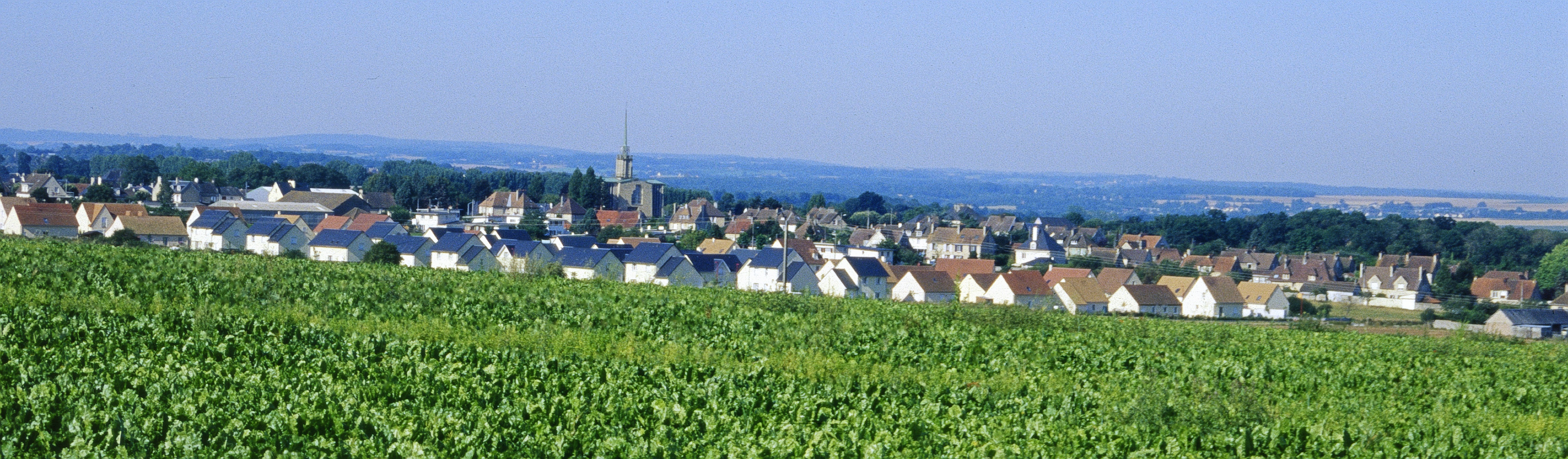
- A general view of May-sur-Orne

- Coat of arms
- Location of May-sur-Orne
- Location within France Location within Normandy
- Coordinates: 49°06′03″N 0°22′21″W
- Country: France
- Region: Normandy
- Department: Calvados
- Arrondissement: Caen
- Canton: Évrecy
- Commune: Saint-Martin-de-May
- Area^{1}: 3.49 km^{2} (1.35 sq mi)
- Elevation: 78 m (256 ft)
- Highest elevation: 80 m (260 ft)
- Lowest elevation: 5 m (16 ft)
- Population (2022): 2,017
  - Density: 578/km^{2} (1,500/sq mi)
- Time zone: UTC+01:00 (CET)
  - Summer (DST): UTC+02:00 (CEST)
- Postal code: 14320
- ^{1} French Land Register data, which excludes lakes, ponds, glaciers > 1 km^{2} (0.386 sq mi or 247 acres) and river estuaries.

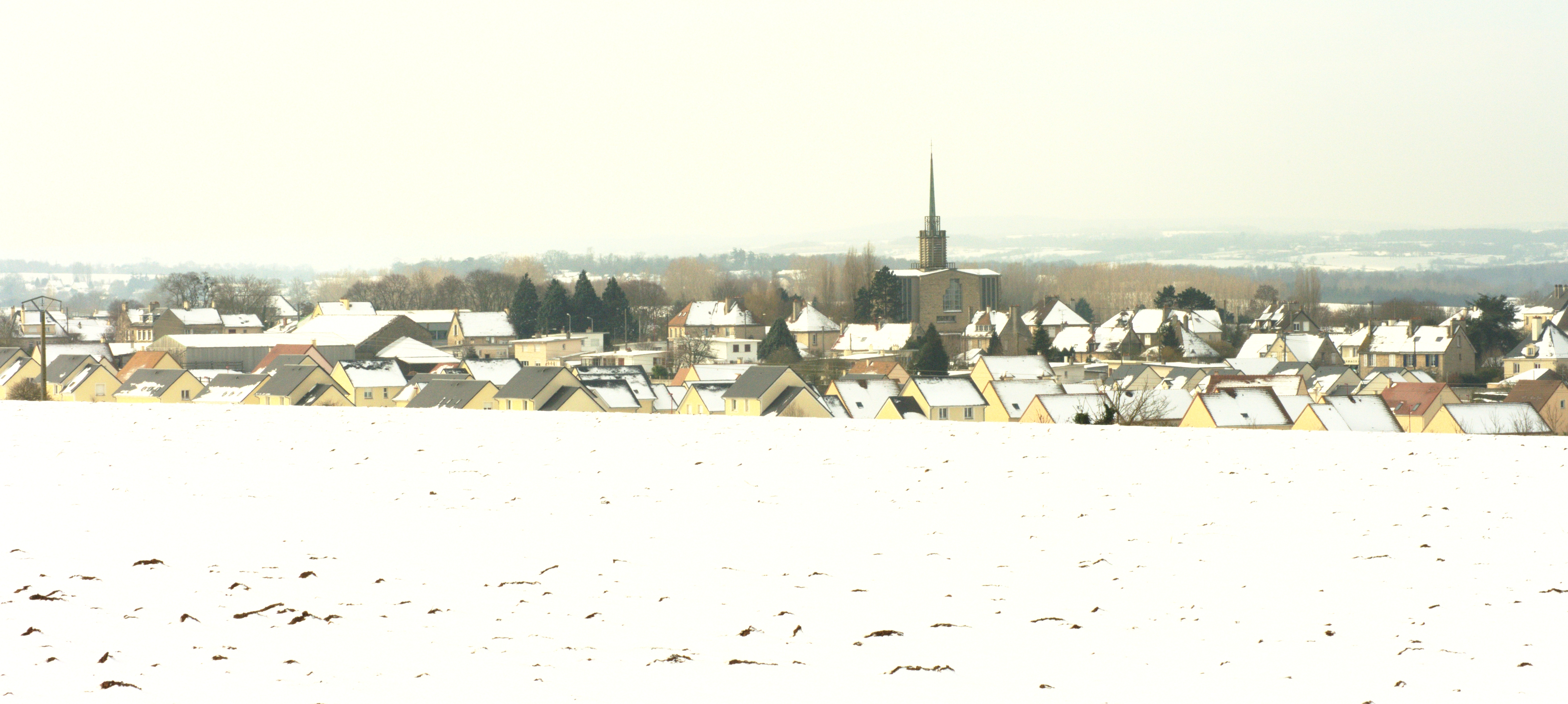
May-sur-Orne in the snow

May-sur-Orne (French pronunciation: [mɛ syʁ ɔʁn], literally May on Orne) is a former commune in the Calvados department in the Normandy region in northwestern France. It was merged with Saint-Martin-de-Fontenay to form Saint-Martin-de-May on 1 January 2025.

== Geography ==
The river Laize, a tributary to the Orne, flows through the commune.

== Population ==
Historical population
Year	Pop.	±% p.a.
1968	1,085	—
1975	1,240	+1.93%
1982	1,345	+1.17%
1990	1,635	+2.47%
1999	1,716	+0.54%
2007	1,889	+1.21%
2012	1,796	−1.00%
2017	1,960	+1.76%
Source: INSEE

== See also ==
- Communes of the Calvados department
