= Saint-Martin-de-Fontenay =

- Part of Saint-Martin-de-May
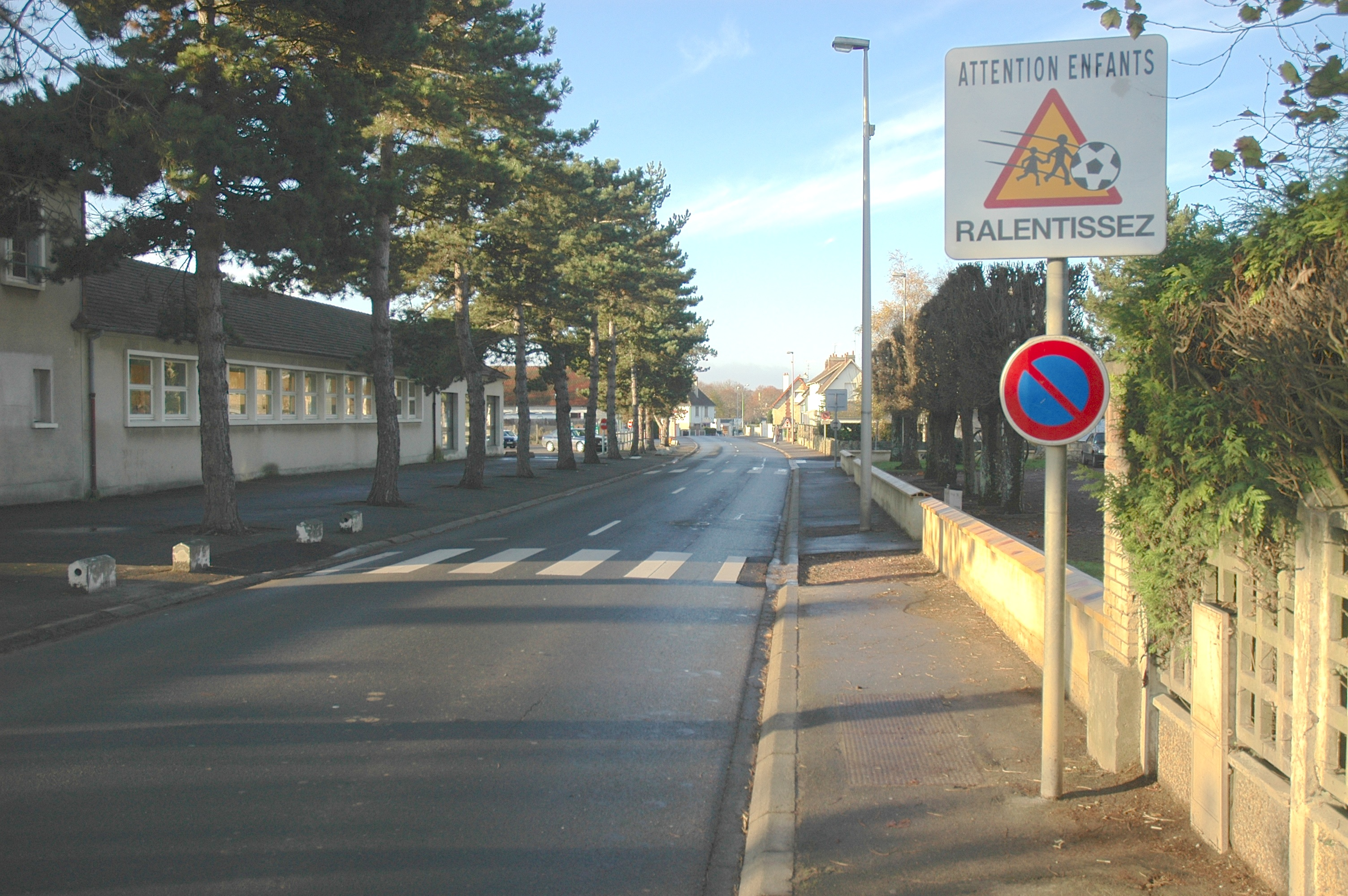
- The eastern road into the village
- Location of Saint-Martin-de-Fontenay
- Location within France Location within Normandy
- Coordinates: 49°07′N 0°22′W
- Country: France
- Region: Normandy
- Department: Calvados
- Arrondissement: Caen
- Canton: Évrecy
- Commune: Saint-Martin-de-May
- Area^{1}: 10.72 km^{2} (4.14 sq mi)
- Elevation: 50 m (160 ft)
- Highest elevation: 87 m (285 ft)
- Lowest elevation: 29 m (95 ft)
- Population (2022): 2,511
  - Density: 234.2/km^{2} (606.7/sq mi)
- Time zone: UTC+01:00 (CET)
  - Summer (DST): UTC+02:00 (CEST)
- Postal code: 14320
- ^{1} French Land Register data, which excludes lakes, ponds, glaciers > 1 km^{2} (0.386 sq mi or 247 acres) and river estuaries.

Saint-Martin-de-Fontenay (French pronunciation: [sɛ̃ maʁtɛ̃ də fɔ̃tnɛ]) is a former commune in the Calvados department, region of Normandy, northwestern France. It was merged with May-sur-Orne to form Saint-Martin-de-May on 1 January 2025.

== Population ==
Historical population

Year	Pop.	±% p.a.
1793	589	—
1821	454	−0.93%
1846	453	−0.01%
1872	428	−0.22%
1901	418	−0.08%
1926	452	+0.31%
1946	348	−1.30%
1954	647	+8.06%
1962	766	+2.13%

Year	Pop.	±% p.a.
1968	895	+2.63%
1975	1,319	+5.70%
1982	1,418	+1.04%
1990	1,884	+3.62%
1999	1,881	−0.02%
2007	2,188	+1.91%
2012	2,571	+3.28%
2017	2,560	−0.09%

Source: EHESS and INSEE (1968-2017)

== Twin towns – sister cities ==
- Stockstadt am Main, Germany, since 1993
- Biganos, France, since 1991

== See also ==
- Communes of the Calvados department
