= Vivien de Saint-Martin =

French geographer

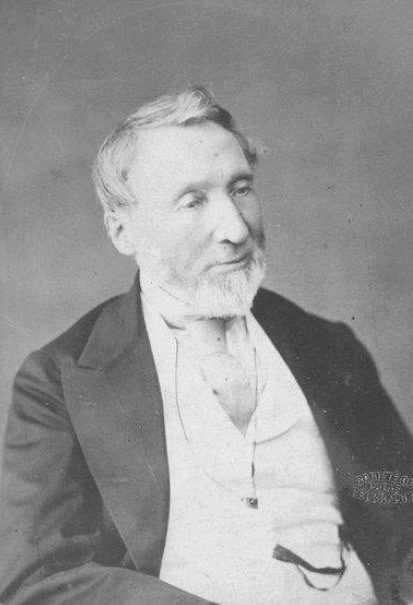
- Photography by Alexandre Quinet.
- Born: 17 May 1802; Saint-Martin-de-Fontenay
- Died: 26 December 1896 (aged 94); Versailles city
- Occupation: Geographer

Louis Vivien, called Vivien de Saint-Martin, (17 May 1802 – 26 December 1896) was a 19th-century French geographer.

== Bibliography ==
- Gustave Vapereau (dir.), Dictionnaire universel des contemporains, 5th edition, Paris, Hachette, 1880, (p. 1826).
- Supplément au Dictionnaire général de biographie et d'histoire, de mythologie, de géographie ancienne et moderne comparée, des antiquités et des institutions grecques, romaines, françaises et étrangères by Charles Dezobry and Théodore Bachelet, 12th edition, Paris, Delagrave, 1902, (p. 3137).

=== Main works ===
- 1841–1842:Histoire générale de la Révolution française, de l'Empire, de la Restauration, de la Monarchie de 1830, jusques et compris 1841 (4 tomes en 2 volumes), Paris, Pourrat frères.
- 1844: Histoire de Napoléon et de l'Empire (2 tomes), Paris, Pourrat frères.
- 1845–1846: Histoire des découvertes géographiques des nations européennes dans les diverses parties du monde (2 volumes), Paris, Arthus-Bertrand.
- 1847: Recherches sur les populations primitives et les plus anciennes traditions du Caucase, Paris, Arthus-Bertrand.
- 1850–1852: Études de géographie ancienne et d'ethnographie asiatique (2 volumes), Paris, Arthus-Bertrand.
- 1852: Description historique et géographique de l'Asie mineure (2 volumes), Paris, Arthus-Bertrand.
- 1858: Étude sur la géographie grecque et latine de l'Inde, Paris, Imprimerie impériale.
- 1860: Étude sur la géographie et les populations primitives du nord-ouest de l'Inde, d'après les hymnes védiques, Paris, Imprimerie impériale.
- 1863: Le Nord de l'Afrique dans l'antiquité grecque et romaine, étude historique et géographique, Paris, Imprimerie impériale. 2010 pbk reprint. ISBN 1275036864.
- 1873: Histoire de la géographie et des découvertes géographiques depuis les temps les plus reculés jusqu'à nos jours, Paris, Hachette. 1875 édition; 2011 pbk reprint. ISBN 1272239683.
- 1876–1915: with Franz Schrader : Atlas universel de géographie construit d'après les sources originales et les documents les plus récents, Paris, Hachette.
- 1879–1900: with Louis Rousselet : Nouveau dictionnaire de géographie universelle (9 volumes), Paris, Hachette.
