= Adolphe Joanne =

French geographical writer and author of travel books

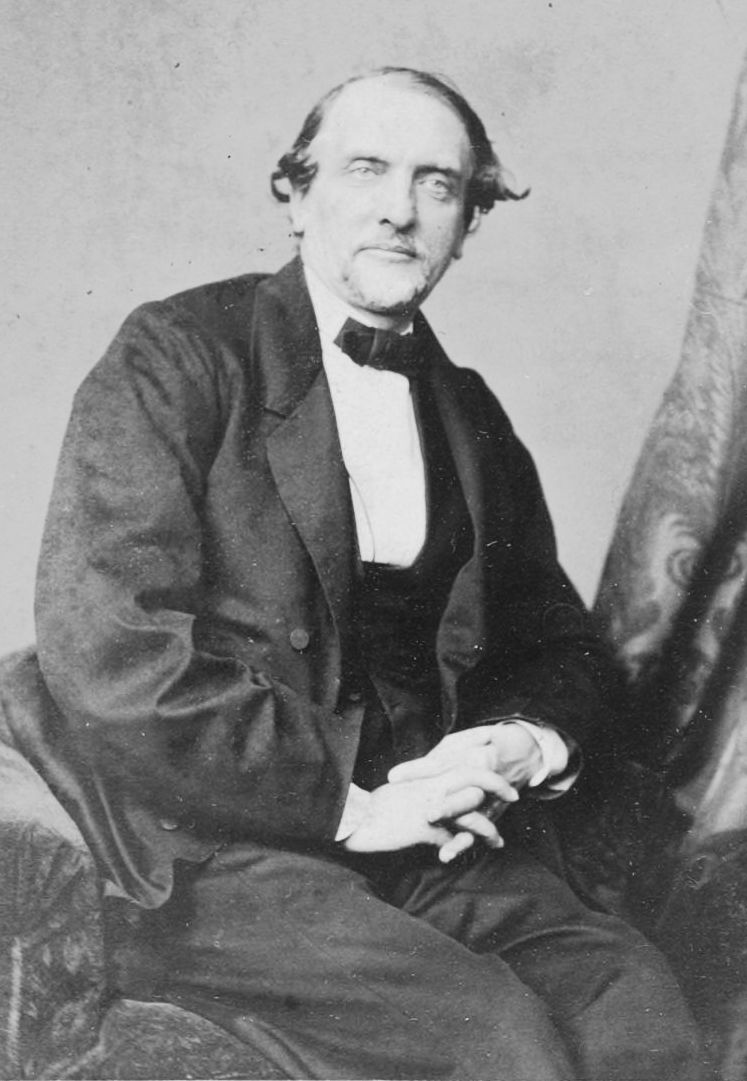
- Born: Adolphe-Laurent Joanne; 15 September 1813; Dijon, France
- Died: 1 March 1881 (aged 67); Paris, France
- Education: Lawyer
- Known for: Writer

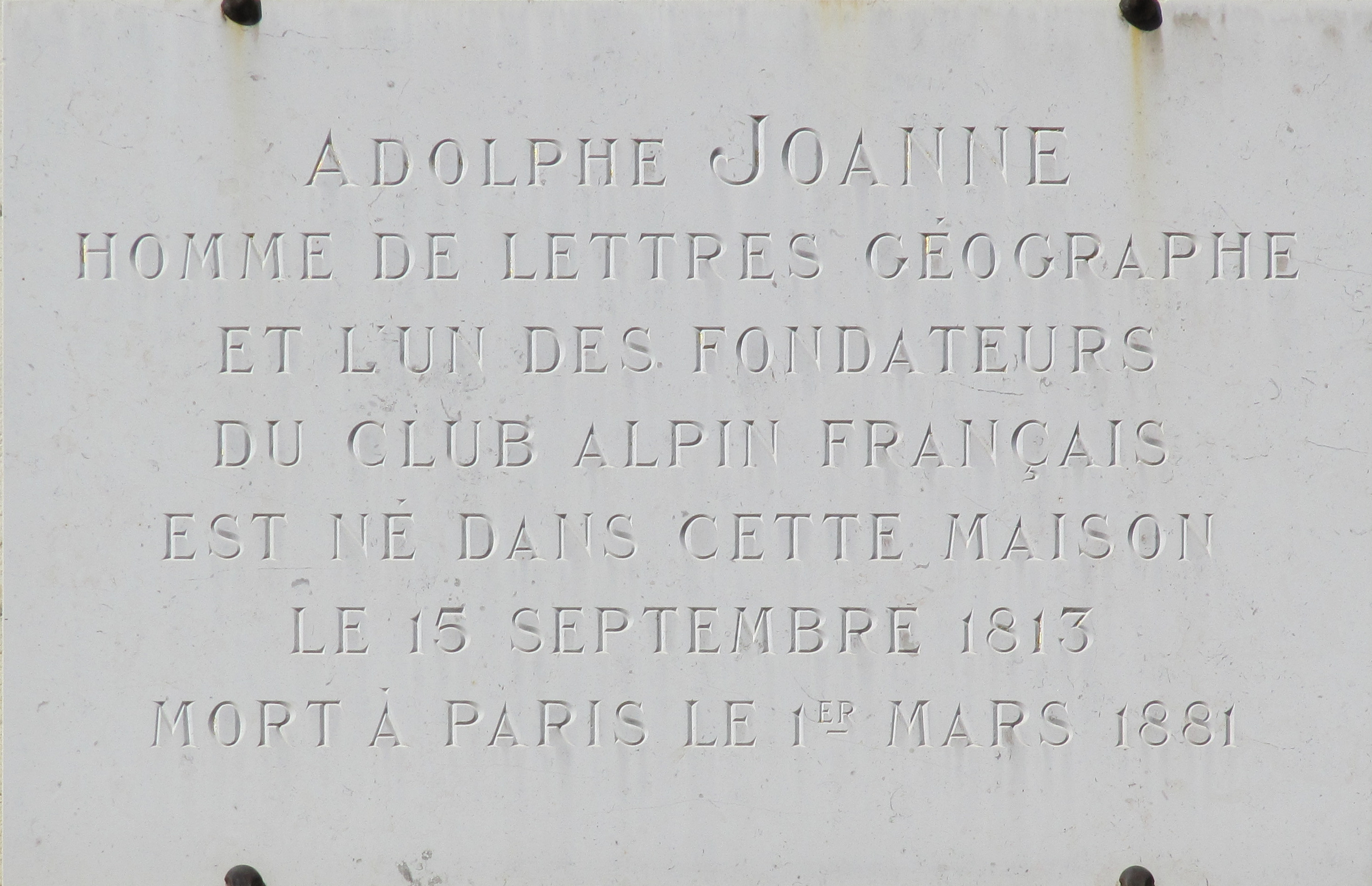
Commemorative plaque in Dijon

Adolphe Joanne (born Adolphe-Laurent Joanne; 15 September 1813 in Dijon, France – 1 March 1881 in Paris) was a French geographical writer and author of travel books.

== Work ==
In 1836 Joanne was a lawyer in Paris but he soon turned to journalism. A trip to Switzerland and the Black Forest prompted him in 1841 to write up a travel guide, which was the starting point for a whole series of similar and partly more extensive works, which covered not only the most interesting places and landscapes of France, but also of Germany, England, Switzerland, and the Orient. His travel books were published frequently, first under the name Guides Joanne and later from 1919 as Guides bleus.

A terser extract of his major travel books was published since 1866 under the title Guides Diamant. Joanne also published in Paris the geographical dictionary Dictionnaire géographique de la France.
