= Louis Gallouédec =

French geographer

Louis Gallouédec (17 February 1864 – 23 January 1937) was a French geographer.
